= Mike E. Clark discography =

Mike E. Clark is an American producer and DJ. His discography consists of four mixtapes under his own name, as well as numerous production credits.

== Albums ==
=== Mixtapes ===
Year	Mixtape	Peak chart positions					
Year	Mixtape	US R&B/Hip-Hop	US	Top Heatseekers	Top Independent Albums	Top Internet Albums	Top Rap Albums
2001	Beats for that Ass Vol 1						
2001	Beats for that Ass Vol 2						
2009	Psychopathic Murder Mix Volume 1	54	125	5	21	125	
2010	Psychopathic Murder Mix Volume 2	46		10			23
2012	Mike E. Clark's Extra Pop Emporium						
2013	Shocked Rhythms & (Damn Near) Speechless Vol 1						
2013	Shocked Rhythms & (Damn Near) Speechless Vol 2						
2013	Shocked Rhythms & (Damn Near) Speechless Vol 3						
2013	Shocked Rhythms & (Damn Near) Speechless Vol 4						

== Production credits ==
Year	Artist	Album	Song(s)	Record label(s)
1988	Viv Akauldren	Witness		
1989	Gangster Fun	Come See Come Ska		
1990	Kid Rock	Grits Sandwiches for Breakfast	"Yo-Da-Lin in the Valley"	Jive; RCA; Top Dog
1991	Esham	Erotic Poetry		Reel Life Productions
1991	Esham	Homey Don't Play		Reel Life Productions
1991	Big Chief	Face		
1992	Gangster Fun	Time Flies When Your Gangster Fun		
1992	Frank Allison & the Odd Sox	Pig Out		
1992	Smokehouse	Only A Dog		Totally Broke Productions
1992	Detroit's Most Wanted	Tricks of the Trades, Vol. 2: The Money Is Made		
1992	Majesty Crush	Fan		
1992	The Gories	Outta Here		
1992	Insane Clown Posse	Carnival of Carnage	"The Juggla", "First Day Out", "Guts on the Ceiling", "Is That You?", "Never Had it Made", "Taste"	Psychopathic Records
1993	Kid Rock	The Polyfuze Method		Continuum Records Top Dog Records
1993	Big Chief	Mack Avenue Skullgame		Sub Pop
1993	Big Chief	Big Chief Brand Product		Sub Pop
1993	Red Red Groovy	25		Continuum Records
1993	Esham	Dance on the Wild Side	"My Man, My Man, My Man (Bubble Gum Gangster Remix)"	AEM
1993	Majesty Crush	Love 15		
1993	Insane Clown Posse	Beverly Kills 50187	"The Stalker", "Joke Ya Mind"	Psychopathic Records
1994	Insane Clown Posse	Ringmaster	(entire album)	Psychopathic Records
1994	Shaggy 2 Dope	Fuck Off!	(entire album)	Psychopathic Records
1994	Insane Clown Posse	The Terror Wheel	(entire album)	Psychopathic Records
1994	Insane Clown Posse	A Carnival Christmas	(entire album)	Psychopathic Records
1994	C.O.A	"Loknezz"		
1994	George Clinton and the P-Funk All Stars	Dope Dogs	"Pack Of Wild Dogs"	
1994	Daddy Freddy	The Big One		
1995	Insane Clown Posse	Riddle Box	(entire album)	Psychopathic Records; Battery Records
1995	Insane Clown Posse	Forgotten Freshness		Psychopathic Records
1995	Various Artists	Mashin' Up the Nation: The Best of American Ska, Vols. 1 & 2		
1995	Project Born	Born Dead	"Graveyard"	Psychopathic Records
1996	George Clinton	Greatest Funkin' Hits	"Knee Deep (Deep As A Mutha Funker Remix)"	
1996	Insane Clown Posse	The Great White Hype Soundtrack	"Chicken Huntin' (Slaughter House Mix)"	Epic Records
1996	Charm Farm	Pervert		
1996	Trash Brats	Out of the Closet		
1996	Insane Clown Posse	Tunnel of Love	(entire album)	Psychopathic Records
1997	Insane Clown Posse	Mutilation Mix	(entire album)	Psychopathic Records
1997	Randolph's Grin	Melt		
1997	George Clinton and Digital Underground	Good Burger	"Knee Deep [The Deeper Mix]"	Capitol Records; Nick Records
1997	Heavy Water Factory	Cries from Hell		
1997	Insane Clown Posse	The Great Milenko	(entire album)	Psychopathic Records; Hollywood Records; Island Records
1997	Twiztid	Mostasteless	"Twiztid", "First Day Out", "Meat Cleaver", "85 Bucks An Hour"	Psychopathic Records
1998	Various Artists	Drunk on Rock, Vol. 1		
1998	Gangster Fun	Pure Sound, Pure Hogwash, Pure Amphetamines		
1998	Nicole	Hellbound		
1998	Insane Clown Posse	Forgotten Freshness Volumes 1 & 2		Psychopathic Records
1998	Myzery	Para la Isla	(entire album)	Psychopathic Records
1999	P.S. I Love You	Where the Fuck is Kevin Shields?		
1999	Insane Clown Posse	The Amazing Jeckel Brothers	(entire album)	Psychopathic Records; Island Records
1999	Insane Clown Posse and Twiztid	Psychopathics from Outer Space	"The Dirt Ball", "$50 Bucks", "Sleep Walker", "Dead End", "Red Neck Hoe '99", "The Amazing Maze", "Meat Cleaver"	Joe & Joey Records
1999	Insane Clown Posse	WWF The Music, Vol. 3	"The Greatest Show"	Koch Records
2000	Insane Clown Posse and Twiztid	Heavy Metal 2000	"The Dirt Ball"	Restless Records
2000	Twiztid	Cryptic Collection	"Meat Cleaver"	Psychopathic Records
2001	Paradime	Vices	"Closure"	Beats-At-Will Records
2001	Strip Club	The Strip Club Sessions		
2001	Dark Lotus	Tales from the Lotus Pod		Psychopathic Records
2001	Insane Clown Posse	Forgotten Freshness Vol. 3		Psychopathic Records
2002	Dead By 28	The Spawning		
2002	Abstrakt Intellekt	First Contact		
2002	Various Artists	Hatchet History: Ten Years of Terror	"Toy Box", "If I Ever Die", "Southwest Song", "Bitches!"	Psychopathic Records
2002	Insane Clown Posse	The Pendulum	(entire album)	Psychopathic Records
2003	Audra Kubat	Untitled for Now		
2003	Bedlam - Bedlamitez Rize	Check The Children		
2003	Dead By 28	Ressur-Wreked		
2003	Lavel	Nutty		
2003	R. L. Burnside	Darker Blues		
2003	Project Deadman	No Rest for the Wicked	(entire album)	
2004	Strip Club	Get Right		
2004	Paradime	11 Steps Down	"Intro", "Rockstar Shit", "Live"	Beats-At-Will Records
2004	Various Artists	Untyin' Lost Souls: A Delectable Blend of Non-Corporate Hip-Hop		
2004	R. L. Burnside	A Bothered Mind		
2004	Project Deadman	Self Inflicted		Strange Music
2005	Pittbull	Very Worst of Pittbull		
2005	Insane Clown Posse	Forgotten Freshness Volume 4	"Homies", "C.P.K.'s"	Psychopathic Records
2006	Kid Rock & the Twisted Brown Trucker Band	Live Trucker		Atlantic RecordsTop Dog Records
2006	Tech N9ne	Everready (The Religion)	"Trapped", "Holy War"	Strange Music
2006	Boondox	The Harvest	"Seven", "Out Here", "It Ain't A Thang", "Lady In The Jaguar", "Rollin Hard", "Sippin", "Lake of Fire", "Red Mist", "Angel Like"	Psychopathic Records
2006	Axe Murder Boyz	Blood In, Blood Out		Psychopathic Records
2006	Shaggy 2 Dope	F.T.F.O.	(entire album)	Psychopathic Records
2006	Jamie Madrox	Phatso/Phatso: Earth 2 Version		Psychopathic Records
2006	Insane Clown Posse	The Wraith: Remix Albums	"Walk into thy Light", "Hell's Forecast", "Juggalo Homies", "Walk into the Darkness", "C.P.K.'s", "Everyday I Die", "Burning Up"	Psychopathic Records
2007	Brian McCarty	Love Forget Me Not		
2007	Boondox	PunkinHed	"They Pray with Snakes"	Psychopathic Records
2007	Kid Rock	Rock N Roll Jesus	"All Summer Long"	Atlantic RecordsTop Dog Records
2007	Various Artists	Psychopathics From Outer Space 3		Psychopathic Records
2007	Insane Clown Posse	Eye of the Storm	(entire album)	Psychopathic Records
2007	Insane Clown Posse	The Tempest	(entire album)	Psychopathic Records
2007	Prozak	Tales From The Sick	(entire album)	Strange Music
2009	Violent J	The Shining	(entire album)	Psychopathic Records
2009	Insane Clown Posse	Bang! Pow! Boom!	(entire album)	Psychopathic Records
2010	Blaze Ya Dead Homie	Gang Rags	(entire album)	Psychopathic Records
2010	Boondox	South of Hell	(entire album)	Psychopathic Records
2011	Vanilla Ice	'WTF'	"Born On Halloween"	Radium Records Inc
2012	Insane Clown Posse	The Mighty Death Pop!	(entire album)	Psychopathic
2012	Mickey Avalon	Loaded	"Tight Blue Jeans"	Suburban Noize Records
2012	Prozak	Paranormal	"Paranormal"	Strange Music
2012	Cold 187um	The Only Solution	"Judgement Day", "3 Brothers", "Swan Sighting", "Interrogation"	Psychopathic
2013	John Fogerty	Wrote a Song for Everyone	"Born On The Bayou" (production & recording)	Vanguard
