= Featuring Freshness =

Compilation album by Insane Clown Posse
- Released: November 1, 2011
- Genre: Midwest hip hop
- Length: 2:11:48
- Label: Psychopathic
- Producer: Mike E. Clark, Fritz the Cat, Team Supreme, Monoxide, DJ Clay, Otis, The R.O.C., Cold 187um, Erotic-D, Mike P, Insane Clown Posse, Violent J, Sistasorois soundsquad.

Insane Clown Posse chronology
The Old Shit (2010)	Featuring Freshness (2011)	The Mighty Death Pop! (2012)

Featuring Freshness is the tenth compilation album by American hip hop group Insane Clown Posse. It was released on November 1, 2011. The album compiles many of the group's collaborations with other rappers. Though the majority of the material on this set is previously released, three new tracks appear on the album, featuring appearances from Afroman, Big Hutch and Paris. Previously released material includes collaborations with the Psychopathic Records and Hatchet House lineup, Ice-T, Snoop Dogg, Kid Rock and Tech N9ne. It is the group's 28th overall release.

== Content ==
The first disc exclusively focuses on guest appearances and collaborations with Psychopathic Records and Hatchet House artists. The second disc focuses on guest appearances and collaborations with artists from other labels, including Three 6 Mafia, Ice-T, Ol' Dirty Bastard, Snoop Dogg, Tech N9ne, Bushwick Bill and MC Breed. Three new tracks appear, featuring Afroman, Big Hutch and Paris. Much of the material on the album has previously been released on other albums, with the exception of three new songs. Kottonmouth Kings was previously announced to appear on the set, but no collaborations with this group appear.

== Reviews ==
Professional ratings
Review scores
Source	Rating
AllMusic	3/5 stars

AllMusic's David Jeffries wrote, "punky hip-hop kids and punky hip-hop kids at heart will appreciate having all these tracks in one place."

== Track listing ==
Disc 1: Family
No.	Title	Music	Performer(s)	Length
1.	"Lady In a Jaguar"	from The Harvest	Boondox feat. ICP	3:48
2.	"Put It Down"	from Psychopathics from Outer Space 3	Jamie Madrox feat. Blaze & ICP	4:08
3.	"Keep It Wicked"	from Medicine Bag	ABK feat. ICP	3:31
4.	"The Party"	from The Tempest	ICP feat. DJ Clay	3:14
5.	"Marsh Lagoon"	from The Green Book	Twiztid feat. ICP	5:15
6.	"Gang Related"	from Hatchet Warrior	ABK feat. Violent J	4:23
7.	"The Gathering"	from Charges of Indictment	The Dayton Family feat. ICP	4:51
8.	"Birthday"	from Gang Rags	Blaze feat. ICP	3:57
9.	"This Bitch"	from Phatso: Earth 2	Twiztid feat. Violent J	3:12
10.	"Always Fuckin with Us"	from F.T.F.O.	Shaggy 2 Dope feat. Twiztid	3:45
11.	"Whoop!"	from Book of the Wicked, Chapter One	DJ Clay feat. ICP and AMB	4:19
12.	"I Don't Care"	from Cryptic Collection Vol. 2	Twiztid feat. ICP	3:44
13.	"Nightline (features the music of the Michael Jackson demo Nightline)"	from Body In A Hole	AMB feat. Violent J	4:16
14.	"Hound Dogs"	from Mostasteless national release version	Dark Lotus	6:02
15.	"Kept Grindin"	from Let 'Em Bleed: The Mixxtape, Vol. 3	DJ Clay feat. ICP, Twiztid, Drive-By, Boondox, AMB	10:07

Disc 2: Homies
No.	Title	Music	Performer(s)	Length
1.	"I Shot a Hater [Remix]"	from Psychopathic Murder Mix Volume 2 and Let 'Em Bleed: The Mixxtape, Vol. 4	ICP feat. Twiztid and Three 6 Mafia	2:57
2.	"House of Mirrors"	from Ringmaster	ICP feat. Capitol E	4:59
3.	"Dead End"	from Psychopathics from Outer Space	ICP feat. Ice-T	5:16
4.	"Bitches"	from The Amazing Jeckel Brothers	ICP feat. Ol' Dirty Bastard	3:20
5.	"Nobody Move"	from Forgotten Freshness Volume 4	ICP feat. Mack 10	3:54
6.	"Is That You? [Remix]"	remixed from Carnival of Carnage	ICP feat. Kid Rock	4:22
7.	"The Shaggy Show"	from The Amazing Jeckel Brothers	ICP feat. Snoop Dogg	6:32
8.	"Truth Dare"	from Psychopathics from Outer Space 3	ICP feat. Bryan Abrams	3:33
9.	"Mad House"	from Forgotten Freshness Volume 4	ICP feat. Tech N9ne	4:22
10.	"Out There"	from Psychopathics from Outer Space 2	ICP feat. Bushwick Bill	3:31
11.	"Swallow This Nut"	from Forgotten Freshness Volume 4	ICP feat. MC Breed, Fresh Kid Ice, Fish N Grits, Vanilla Ice	3:10
12.	"Let's Toast"	original	ICP feat. Afroman	4:14
13.	"Underground Hot Street Banger"	from Psychopathic Murder Mix Volume 2	ICP feat. Tone Tone	4:30
14.	"Danger Party"	original	ICP feat. Big Hutch	3:23
15.	"Surviving the Game"	original	ICP feat. Paris	5:13
