= Psychopathic Murder Mix Volume 1 =

Remix album by Mike E. Clark
- Released: June 23, 2009
- Recorded: Funhouse Studio
- Genre: Hip hop
- Length: 55:19
- Label: Psychopathic Records
- Producer: Mike E. Clark

Mike E. Clark chronology
Psychopathic Murder Mix Volume 1 (2009)	Psychopathic Murder Mix Volume 2 (2010)

Psychopathic Murder Mix Volume 1 is a remix album by Mike E. Clark. Released on June 23, 2009, it features mashups and remixes of songs by Insane Clown Posse, Twiztid, Boondox, Prozak, King Gordy and Blaze Ya Dead Homie. It also features appearances by Awesome Dre, The R.O.C. and Esham.

== Music ==
Psychopathic Murder Mix Volume 1 was created, recorded, performed, produced, and mixed in the Funhouse Studio by Mike E. Clark. The album is made up of seven remixes and three mashups, all but one from which the original versions were produced by Mike E. Clark, as well as five original tracks.

Allrovi said that "The kinetic productions combine the influence of old-school electro with the funk flavor of Clark's former employer George Clinton [and] a bit of Danny Elfman's sense of humor in the Oingo Boingo-like mad-clown melodies."

== Reception ==
Professional ratings
Review scores
Source	Rating
Allrovi	3.5/5 stars

Allrovi wrote, "Anyone who thinks Clark is the label's driving force will appreciate all this evidence, while fan club members will get some deconstructions to relish."

== Track listing ==
No.	Title	Music	Performer	Length
1.	"Intro"	original	Mike E. Clark	3:06
2.	"Whoz Goin Next? (Triple X Mash Up)" ("Cotton Candy", "Cherry Pie (I Need a Freak)", and "Spin the Bottle")	from Tunnel of Love, Bizzar, and Mostasteless	Insane Clown Posse and Twiztid	4:40
3.	"Fuck Off (Remix #2)"	from Fuck Off!	Insane Clown Posse	4:22
4.	"Chickin Pluckin Huntin (Remix)"	from Ringmaster	Insane Clown Posse	4:45
5.	"Rock The Dead Body Man" ("Rock the Dead" and "Dead Body Man")	from Mostasteless and Riddle Box	Insane Clown Posse and Twiztid	5:46
6.	"Neck Cutter (The Loons Remix)"	from Ringmaster	Insane Clown Posse and Awesome Dre	3:25
7.	"Out Here (Remix)"	from The Harvest	Boondox	3:55
8.	"The Only Ones"	From "Play It Loud: Horrifik Thoughts Promo"	Project: Deadman and King Gordy	2:37
9.	"Ill Connect (Remix)"	from Clockwork Gray	Zodiac MPrint	4:08
10.	"Frankenstein (Remix)"	from The Green Book	Twiztid and Blaze Ya Dead Homie	4:07
11.	"How Long Will You Juggalos Be Down?"	original	Insane Clown Posse and Mike E. Clark	2:10
12.	"Murder You (Remix)"	"Knock, Knock" from The Shining GOTJ Edition	Violent J and Esham	4:22
13.	"Mike Tries To Play Violin While Willabe Rags Argues With Violent J"	original	Insane Clown Posse	1:35
14.	"Southwest Mash-Up" ("Southwest Song" and "Southwest Voodoo")	from Ringmaster and The Great Milenko	Insane Clown Posse	4:55
15.	"Outro"	original	Mike E. Clark	1:33

== Samples ==
- Rock The Dead Body Man
  - "Wagon Wagon" by Insane Clown Posse from Ringmaster
- Out Here (Remix)
  - "The Killing Fields" by Insane Clown Posse from Riddle Box
- Ill Connect (Remix)
  - Instrumental from "Wicked Hellaween" by Insane Clown Posse from Forgotten Freshness Volume 4
- How Long Will You Juggalos Be Down?
  - Instrumental from "Get Off Me Dog" by Insane Clown Posse from Ringmaster
  - "Down With the Clown" by Insane Clown Posse from The Great Milenko
- Southwest Mash-Up
  - "Mr. Johnson's Head" by Insane Clown Posse from Ringmaster
- Outro
  - "Amy's in the Attic" by Insane Clown Posse from The Terror Wheel
  - "Cemetery Girl" by Insane Clown Posse from Riddle Box
