= Psychopathic: The Videos =

Video by Various artists
- Released: November 13, 2007
- Genre: Midwest hip hop
- Length: 120:00
- Label: Psychopathic

Psychopathic: The Videos is a DVD collection of remastered music videos released by Psychopathic Video. The film features videos by the artists Insane Clown Posse, Twiztid, Boondox, Blaze Ya Dead Homie, Esham, Axe Murder Boyz, Anybody Killa, and Psychopathic Rydas.

== Content ==
The collection contains a variety of uncensored, partially censored, and clean versions of music videos. Each video features an intro from a different Psychopathic artist. The video features remastered music videos released by Psychopathic Records from the label's inception up to 2007. Each video is given an introduction by a different artist on the label. In addition to the 23 listed music videos, the collection includes two hidden music videos. The only videos not released were the three Professional wrestling highlight videos released by Juggalo Championship Wrestling featuring the songs "Down With The Clown" by Insane Clown Posse and "I Don't Care" by Dark Lotus.

== Track listing ==
No.	Title	Music	Performer(s)	Length
1.	"Homies"	The Wraith: Shangri-La	Insane Clown Posse and Twiztid
2.	"They Pray With Snakes"	The Harvest	Boondox
3.	"Ill Connect"	Clockwork Gray	Blaze Ya Dead Homie and The R.O.C.
4.	"Tilt-A-Whirl"	Bizaar	Insane Clown Posse
5.	"We Don't Die"	Freek Show	Twiztid
6.	"Halls of Illusions""	The Great Milenko	Insane Clown Posse
7.	"Woo Woo Woo"	Repentance	Esham
8.	"Chicken Huntin'"	Ringmaster	Insane Clown Posse
9.	"Old Girl/Honor/Scream My Name"	Blood In, Blood Out	Axe Murder Boyz
10.	"Story of Our Lives"	Man's Myth (Vol. 1)	Twiztid
11.	"Another Love Song"	The Amazing Jeckel Brothers	Insane Clown Posse
12.	"Chicken Huntin' (Slaughterhouse Remix)"	Riddle Box	Insane Clown Posse
13.	"Hey Y'all"	Dirty History	Anybody Killa
14.	"Afraid of Me"	The Green Book	Twiztid
15.	"How Many Times?"	The Great Milenko	Insane Clown Posse
16.	"Justa Hustla"	A-1 Yola	Esham
17.	"Bowling Balls"	Hell's Pit	Insane Clown Posse
18.	"Red Mist"	The Harvest	Boondox, Blaze Ya Dead Homie, and Twiztid
19.	"The People"	Forgotten Freshness Volume 4	Insane Clown Posse
20.	"Raw Deal (The Juggalo Song)"	Independents Day	Twiztid
21.	"Piggy Pie"	The Great Milenko	Insane Clown Posse
22.	"Hokus Pokus (Headhunta'z Remix)"	Forgotten Freshness Volumes 1 & 2	Insane Clown Posse
23.	"Let's Go All the Way"	Bizzar	Insane Clown Posse
Total length:				120:00

Hidden videos
No.	Title	Music	Performer(s)	Length
1.	"Duk Da Fuk Down"		Psychopathic Rydas
2.	"Real Underground Baby"	Hell's Pit	Insane Clown Posse
