= Psychopathic Murder Mix Volume 2 =

Remix album by Mike E. Clark
- Released: November 9, 2010
- Recorded: Funhouse Studio
- Genre: Hip hop
- Length: 66:40
- Label: Psychopathic Records
- Producer: Mike E. Clark

Mike E. Clark chronology
| Psychopathic Murder Mix Volume 1 (2009) | Psychopathic Murder Mix Volume 2 (2010) | Mike E. Clark's Extra Pop Emporium (2012) |

Psychopathic Murder Mix Volume 2 is a remix album by Mike E. Clark. Released on November 9, 2010 , it features mashups and remixes of songs by Insane Clown Posse, Twiztid, Jamie Madrox, Boondox, Three 6 Mafia, Samhain Witch Killers, and Blaze Ya Dead Homie. It also features appearances by Tone Tone, Kottonmouth Kings, and Bootleg of The Dayton Family.

== Production ==
Psychopathic Murder Mix Volume 2 was created, recorded, performed, produced, and mixed in the Funhouse Studio by Mike E. Clark. The album is made up of eleven remixes, three mashups, and one cover song performed by Mike E. Clark, all but one from which the original versions were produced by Clark, as well as three original tracks.

== Track listing ==
| No. | Title | Music | Performer | Length |
|---|---|---|---|---|
| 1. | "Murder Mix Vol 2 Introduction" | original | Mike E. Clark | 1:18 |
| 2. | "Piggie Pie (Remix)" | from The Great Milenko | Insane Clown Posse | 4:18 |
| 3. | "Underground Hot Street Banger" | original | Insane Clown Posse and Tone Tone | 4:29 |
| 4. | "I Shot A Hater (Remix)" | from Let 'Em Bleed: The Mixxtape, Vol. 4 | Insane Clown Posse, Twiztid, and Three 6 Mafia | 2:57 |
| 5. | "Wagon Wagon/I Do This (Mash-Up)" ("Wagon Wagon" and "I Do This") | from Ringmaster and The Tempest | Insane Clown Posse | 4:34 |
| 6. | "Damn Bitch (Remix)" | from Gang Rags | Blaze Ya Dead Homie, Kottonmouth Kings, and Bootleg | 3:50 |
| 7. | "My Posse Is On Broadway (Remix)" | from Take a Bite Outta Rhyme: A Rock Tribute to Rap | Insane Clown Posse | 3:57 |
| 8. | "Killer Wicked Witch Wig Splitter (Remix)" | from 4 The Fam EP | Samhain Witch Killers | 2:47 |
| 9. | "Get Em (Remix)" | from Phatso | Jamie Madrox | 3:19 |
| 10. | "Lil Somthin Somthin (Remix)" | from Riddle Box | Insane Clown Posse | 4:00 |
| 11. | "Cotton Candy Land (Mash-Up)" ("Cotton Candy" and "Candy Land") | from Tunnel of Love and The Shining | Insane Clown Posse | 3:53 |
| 12. | "Headless Zombie Boogie (Mash-Up)" ("Headless Boogie" and "Zombie Slide") | from Riddle Box and Bang! Pow! Boom! | Insane Clown Posse | 6:14 |
| 13. | "Skitzoprantic (Remix)" | from The Terror Wheel | Insane Clown Posse | 3:53 |
| 14. | "What Is A Juggalo (Remix)" | from The Great Milenko | Insane Clown Posse | 3:35 |
| 15. | "Toast To The Fam (Remix)" | from South of Hell | Boondox | 4:12 |
| 16. | "Thrill Of The Kill (Remix)" | from Eye of the Storm | Insane Clown Posse | 3:45 |
| 17. | "Down With The Clown (The MEC Version)" | from The Great Milenko | Mike E. Clark | 4:45 |
| 18. | "Outro" | original | Mike E. Clark | 1:03 |

== Samples ==
- My Posse Is On Broadway (Remix)
  - "Red Mist" by Boondox from The Harvest
- Killer Wicked Witch Wig Splitter (Remix)
  - "Pull Me Over" by Shaggy 2 Dope from F.T.F.O.
- Headless Zombie Boogie (Mash-Up)
  - "Boogie Woogie Wu'" by Insane Clown Posse from The Great Milenko and "Headless Boogie" by Insane Clown Posse from "Riddle Box."
- Toast To The Fam (Remix)
  - "Sippin'" by Boondox from The Harvest
- Outro
  - "Fuck the World" by Insane Clown Posse from The Amazing Jeckel Brothers
