= Hatchet House discography =

Hatchet House is an American independent subsidiary record label of Psychopathic Records based in Farmington Hills, Michigan. Created in 2007, the label specializes in hip hop music. Since its foundation, the label has featured 7 artists and bands from the United States, predominantly around Detroit, Michigan.

== Catalog ==
| Year | Artist | Title | Peak chart positions | | | | RIAA Certification (sales thresholds) | Co-labels^{[a]} |
| Year | Artist | Title | US | US Indie | US Rap | US Heat | RIAA Certification (sales thresholds) | Co-labels^{[a]} |
|---|---|---|---|---|---|---|---|---|
| 2008 | DJ Clay | Let 'Em Bleed: The Mixxtape, Vol. 1 | — | 48 | — | 19 | — | — |
| 2008 | The R.O.C. | Welcome To The Darkside | — | — | — | — | — | — |
| 2008 | DJ Clay | Let 'Em Bleed: The Mixxtape, Vol. 2 | 156 | 23 | — | 9 | — | — |
| 2008 | Various | Tunnel Runners | — | — | — | — | — | — |
| 2008 | Axe Murder Boyz | Gods Hand | — | 36 | — | 11 | — | Canonize Records |
| 2008 | DJ Clay | Let 'Em Bleed: The Mixxtape, Vol. 3 | — | — | — | — | — | — |
| 2009 | Motown Rage | With Us Or Against Us | — | — | — | — | — | — |
| 2009 | Mike E. Clark | Psychopathic Murder Mix Volume 1 | — | — | — | — | — | — |
| 2009 | DJ Clay | Let 'Em Bleed: The Mixxtape, Vol. 4 | — | — | — | — | — | — |
| 2010 | DJ Clay | Book of the Wicked, Chapter One | — | — | — | 12 | — | — |
| 2010 | Mike E. Clark | Psychopathic Murder Mix Volume 2 | — | — | 23 | — | — | — |
| 2010 | DJ Clay | Book of the Wicked, Chapter Two | — | 26 | 21 | — | — | — |
| 2010 | Axe Murder Boyz | Body In A Hole | — | — | — | — | — | — |
| 2011 | The Dayton Family | Psycho | — | — | — | — | — | — |
| 2011 | The Dayton Family | Charges of Indictment | — | — | — | — | — | — |
| 2012 | Mike E. Clark | Extra Pop Emporium | — | — | — | — | — | — |
| 2013 | DJ Clay | A World Upside Down: The Mixxtape | — | — | — | — | — | — |

- ^{1} All albums are released in association with Psychopathic Records.
- ^{2} Extra Pop Eporium was released in the "White Pop" version of Insane Clown Posse's album The Mighty Death Pop!.

The very first artist signed to Hatchet House was the rapper, Tali Demon in February 2007. Tali left the label only after 8 months due to creative differences.
