= Homies (Insane Clown Posse song) =

Single by Insane Clown Posse featuring Twiztid

from the album The Wraith: Shangri-La
- Released: 2002
- Genre: Rap rock
- Label: Psychopathic
- Songwriter(s): Joseph Bruce, Mike Puwal

Insane Clown Posse singles chronology
"Tilt-A Whirl" (2000)	"Homies" (2002)	"Hell's Forecast"/"Murder Rap" (2002)

"Homies" is a song written by Insane Clown Posse, Mike Puwal, and Twiztid for ICP's 2002 album The Wraith: Shangri-La. After the 1992 single "Psychopathic", "Homies" is the second single released by the group to not be produced by Mike E. Clark, who had stopped working with Psychopathic Records due to a disagreement with ICP's Joseph Bruce and Joseph Utsler. Clark later produced a remix of the song, which appeared on Forgotten Freshness Volume 4, after Clark reconciled with ICP.

A single was released later in the year, and a music video for the song was produced, featuring appearances by the entire Psychopathic Records roster at the time, which included Anybody Killa, Blaze Ya Dead Homie, Esham, and Zug Izland. The song's lyrics focus on the positive aspects of friendship and are more upbeat and cheerful than ICP is generally known for. Unlike most ICP work, the song was well-received by critics. It is listed on streaming services as "Juggalo Homies" to distinguish it from a newer ICP song also called "Homies".

== Recording ==
During the recording of ICP's double album releases Bizzar and Bizaar, the duo had a falling out with producer Mike E. Clark and decided to record The Wraith: Shangri-La without him. In 2001, Insane Clown Posse built its own studio called "The Lotus Pod" in Detroit, Michigan. After brainstorming in seclusion about the album, the group traveled to recording studios across the United States to produce The Wraith: Shangri-La. They began writing and recording in Dallas, Texas, along with Zug Izland and producer Mike Puwal.

== Lyrics and music ==
Puwal offered Insane Clown Posse a sound Bruce described as being more pop-oriented. Writer Bradley Torreano of AllMusic describes "Homies" as the group's most positive song and a "laid-back rock track." The lyrics describe the positive aspects of loyalty and friendship.

== Music video ==
A music video was produced for the song, featuring Insane Clown Posse, Twiztid and Zug Izland, as well as appearances by Anybody Killa, Blaze Ya Dead Homie, Esham, and Psychopathic Records employees. It was reissued on the DVD Psychopathic: The Videos in 2007.

== Reception ==
AllMusic and Spin both gave "Homies" positive reviews.

== Track listing ==
No.	Title	Length
1.	"Homies (Street Version)"
2.	"Bloody Bitch"
3.	"Juggalo Chant"
4.	"Homies (Radio Version)"

== Charts ==
Chart (2003)	Peak position
Australia (ARIA Charts)	51
