= Forgotten Freshness Volume 4 =

Compilation album by Insane Clown Posse
- Released: November 29, 2005
- Genres: Hip hop, horrorcore
- Length: 115:15
- Label: Psychopathic Records

Insane Clown Posse chronology
GOTJ 2005 (2005)	Forgotten Freshness Volume 4 (2005)	The Wraith: Remix Albums (2006)

Forgotten Freshness Volume 4 is a rarities album by American hip hop group Insane Clown Posse. It features rare and unreleased tracks recorded throughout the group's career. It also came with a bonus compilation album of all of the Insane Clown Posse's yearly Hallowicked song releases, titled Hallowicked Compilation. The album is unique for having a pumpkin scent to its discs, matching the Hallowicked theme. It is the group's 4th installment in the "Forgotten Freshness album series", their 6th compilation album, and their 21st overall release.

Professional ratings
Review scores
Source	Rating
Allmusic	3/5 stars

== Music and lyrics ==
Forgotten Freshness Volume 4 contains two remixes by Mike E. Clark. Clark had a falling out with Insane Clown Posse in 2000, and during the time the two did not work together the group released two studio albums. After the two reconciled, Clark remixed one song from each album. "Homies" is a remix of the song by the same name from The Wraith: Shangri-La, and "C.P.K.'s" is a remix of the song by the same name from Hell's Pit.

The songs "The People," "Clown Walk," "If I Was King," "Mad House," "Staaaaaaaaale!!!," "Wicked Rappers Delight," "Nobody Move," and "Swallow This Nut" were recorded specifically for Forgotten Freshness Volume 4. "If I Was A King" is based on a sample from the Boney M. song "Rasputin". "Wicked Rappers Delight" is a horrorcore tribute to the Sugarhill Gang song "Rapper's Delight". All of the skits from the album were outtakes from previous albums The Terror Wheel, Riddle Box, Tunnel of Love, The Wraith: Shangri-La, and Hell's Pit. "Nobody Move" was recorded in the back of a tour bus during the "Hell's Pit Tour" in 2004. The song is a cover of Eazy-E's song of the same name from his album Eazy-Duz-It.

"Intro" was originally intended to be the intro for Tunnel of Love. "Dear ICP" was recorded in 1993 and was supposed to be released on The Ringmaster. The songs "Feels So Right" and "Bodies Fly" were intended for Hell's Pit. "Panties" was originally intended for Shaggy 2 Dope's solo album F.T.F.O., but the album was delayed. The song was put on Forgotten Freshness Volume 4 as a sample of his album. "If You Can't Beat 'Em Join 'Em" was recorded in 1992 and intended to be released on The Terror Wheel. The beat was later used for the song "Skitsofrantic" from the same album. The song "Yours Begins Tonight" was intended for The Wraith: Shangri-La. The version of "Thug Pit (feat. Kottonmouth Kings, Tech N9ne and Bone Thugs -N- Harmony)", on disc 2 is a different mix than the original mix handed out in 2003.

== Track listing ==
=== Disc One ===
Forgotten Freshness Volume 4
No.	Title	Note	Length
1.	"Intro"	scrapped intro from Tunnel Of Love	1:15
2.	"The People"	original	3:52
3.	"Clown Walk"	original	2:14
4.	"If I Was King"	original	3:12
5.	"Dear ICP"	scrapped song from Ringmaster	5:10
6.	"Mad House" (with Tech N9ne)	original	4:23
7.	"Feels So Right"	scrapped song from Hells Pit	3:37
8.	"Homies" (with Twiztid and Mike E. Clark)	remixed from The Wraith: Shangri-La	3:45
9.	"Staaaaaaaaale!!!"	original	3:29
10.	"Bodies Fly"	scrapped song from Hells Pit	2:13
11.	"Wicked Rappers Delight" (with Esham)	original	4:44
12.	"Panties"	scrapped from F.T.F.O.	3:15
13.	"If You Can't Beat 'Em Join 'Em"	scrapped song from The Terror Wheel	4:34
14.	"Nobody Move" (with Mack 10)	original	3:57
15.	"Yours Begins Tonight"	scrapped song from The Wraith: Shangri-La	2:53
16.	"C.P.K.'s" (with Mike E. Clark)	remixed from Hell's Pit	3:42
17.	"Swallow This Nut" (with Vanilla Ice, Fresh Kid Ice, Fish 'N' Grits, and MC Breed)	original	3:11

=== Disc Two ===
Hallowicked Compilation
No.	Title	Note	Length
1.	"Intro"	from 1998 Hallowicked Concert Intro	0:33
2.	"Dead Pumpkins"	from Hallowicked 1994	4:41
3.	"Mr. Rotten Treats"	from Hallowicked 1995	5:39
4.	"Halloween on Military Street"	from Hallowicked 1996	5:15
5.	"Mr. Johnson's Head [Remix]"	from Hallowicked 1997	6:07
6.	"Pumpkin Carver" (with Twiztid and Kottonmouth Kings)	from Hallowicked 1998	4:41
7.	"Sleep Walkers"	from Hallowicked 1999	4:49
8.	"Toxic Love"	from Hallowicked 2000	4:20
9.	"Every Halloween"	from Hallowicked 2001	3:30
10.	"Silence of the Hams" (with Esham)	from Hallowicked 2002	3:43
11.	"Thug Pit [Remix]" (with Kottonmouth Kings, Esham, Bone Thugs-N-Harmony, and Tech N9ne)	from Hallowicked 2003	4:41
12.	"Murda Cloak" (with Anybody Killa)	from Hallowicked 2004	4:48
13.	"Wicked Hellaween"	from Hallowicked 2005	3:11

== Chart positions ==
Chart (2005)	Peak Position
Billboard 200	88
Top Independent Albums	4
