= Dog Beats =

EP by Inner City Posse
- Released: February 4, 1991
- Recorded: 1990–91
- Genres: Hip hop; G-funk; gangsta rap
- Length: 19:51
- Label: Psychopathic
- Producers: Joseph Bruce, Chuck Miller

Inner City Posse chronology
Bass-ment Cuts (1991)	Dog Beats (1991)	Carnival of Carnage (1992)

Dog Beats is a 1991 EP by Inner City Posse, later to be known as Insane Clown Posse. Having previously created and released three homemade "basement tapes" (distributed locally and highly sought after by collectors today) that were recorded on cassette via karaoke machine ("Enter the Ghetto Zone", "Intelligence and Violence", and "Bass-ment Cuts"), Dog Beats was both the Inner City Posse's first release to be recorded professionally and was also the first record ever released by Psychopathic Records.

== Production ==
In the early 1990s, Joseph Bruce, Joseph Utsler and Utsler's brother, John, performed at local night clubs, using the stage names Violent J, 2 Dope, and John Kickjazz, under the name of their gang, Inner City Posse. Seeing a need for a manager, Bruce's brother Robert recommended his friend and record store owner Alex Abbiss, who established the Psychopathic Records record label with the group in 1991. Later that year the group released the self-produced EP entitled Dog Beats. Growing popularity in the local music scene turned negative for the group's gang, which became the target of growing violence. After receiving jail sentences, the group members abandoned gang life.

=== Music and lyricism ===
Dog Beats began recording at Miller Midi Productions in Detroit, Michigan with Chuck Miller producing and mastering the album. This album features samples of other artists lyrics and songs. "Life at Risk" uses a sample from The Wiz's "What Would I Do If I Could Feel?" and contains some lyrics from the Ice Cube track "Who's the Mack?". The title track uses a looped sample from the George Clinton's song "Atomic Dog" as its bassline and refrain. "Ghetto Zone" uses a sample from Rod Stewart's "Da Ya Think I'm Sexy?".

Miller produced each track very slowly. After long periods of studio time, and a lot of money spent, the group had their first song produced, "Ghetto Zone". Bruce later called Miller a "snake". While Miller would begin working on the group's first full-length studio album as Insane Clown Posse, Carnival of Carnage, he was later replaced by Mike E. Clark, following a managerial decision by Alex Abbiss.

Joseph Bruce samples several clips from the film The Wizard of Oz in "Wizard of the Hood". The song was originally written by Bruce sometime in the late 1980s. The first recorded version of the song appeared on the Intelligence and Violence EP under the name "Wizard of Delray".

=== Album artwork ===
For the cover, Bruce had his friend, Don, hang from a rope in Delray dressed as a clown. Don would later perform with ICP in their early days as a hype man, but after an embarrassing concert at Ferris State University, and tired of being just a hype man, he decided to quit the group. Joseph Utsler drew a jester marionette holding up the "ICP" logo. Inner City Posse wanted the artwork to have typesetting and presentation that looked professional, so Alex Abbiss hired a graphic designer to process the materials, which included a photograph of the group, into a cover. The designer told them that he had to charge them 50 cents more than the usual fee for every typesetting that was larger than the standard type; the designer attempted to charge them a $10 fee for the explicit lyrics box, which would have featured white letters over a black background. As the designer continued to describe the fees the group would be charged, they realized that they were being ripped off.

== Release ==
Dog Beats was Psychopathic Records' first release; Bruce wanted the album to be "available everywhere" because people would not expect a local act to be as widely released. This sales method did not turn out as planned, as the album was mostly released locally; further, it was not purchased by as many stores as Bruce had hoped. The group members took turns going out with unattractive women who worked at Kinkos in exchange for having their fliers promoting the album printed for free. The group promoted the album themselves by putting up the fliers across the city.

While promoting the album, Bruce and William Dail drove up to a young African American man and Bruce asked him if he liked rap music. The kid, who appeared scared, told him "no". Bruce, still determined, told him that if he knew someone who did, he could "give them this" and threw a cassette copy of Dog Beats on the ground. As Bruce and Dail began to drive away, their back windows were shot out and they looked behind them to find that the kid had pulled out a gun and shot out their windows.

Later, Bruce was putting fliers on the windows of cars in the parking lot of the heavy metal club Harpo's. He was hassled by a security guard, who told him that Bruce could not put up fliers unless it was for a performance at the club. Bruce apologized, but the security guard insisted that Bruce go back and take every flier off of every car. As he left with his fliers, the guard pulled him over and asked what he had. Bruce explained, "I'm in ICP, we're a rap group"; the security guard responded by punching him in the face so hard that Bruce's nose has been crooked ever since.

Insane Clown Posse were asked to perform at Ferris State University in promotion of the EP. A snowstorm delayed the group's performance, and because there were no microphones, the performance consisted of Bruce and Utsler "yelling over [their] own cassette". After they finished their two-song set, Bruce stated that the audience "didn't cheer or boo. They just stood there, stunned." Bruce and Utsler later learned that the actual concert had taken place on the other side of the college three hours earlier, but decided that the mishap "wasn't even close to slowing [their careers] down."

Abbiss actively sought out local airplay for Inner City Posse, but radio broadcasters were reluctant to play the single "Dog Beats" once they learned that the members were white. While trying to get stations to play the single, Bruce learned that one of the stations he and Abbiss visited would be interviewing local rapper Esham, who Bruce considered to be a "superstar"; Bruce had recently begun to collect Esham's albums, as he had done with other local rappers; by the time he had discovered Esham, the rapper had released two full-length albums and three EPs. Bruce met Esham for the first time at the station and appraised him. Esham wished Bruce well and Bruce gave the rapper a copy of Dog Beats, beginning the two rappers' friendship and professional relationship.

In late 1991, the group invested more money into production than was covered by returns. The group decided that its gangsta rap style was the cause of the problem: Most emcees at the time used similar styles, making it difficult for Inner City Posse to distinguish itself stylistically. After the change in musical style, the group decided it needed a new name. Utsler suggested keeping the "I.C.P." initials to inform the community that Inner City Posse was not defunct, an idea to which the group agreed. Several names were considered before Bruce recalled his dream of a clown running around in Delray, which became the inspiration for the group's new name: Insane Clown Posse. The other members agreed, deciding that they would take on this new genre and name, and would all don face paint due to the success of their former clown-painted hype man. Upon returning home that night, Bruce says he had a dream in which "spirits in a traveling carnival appeared to him"—an image that would become the basis for the Dark Carnival mythology detailed in the group's Joker's Cards series, beginning with Carnival of Carnage.

== Legacy ==
"Wizard of the Hood" was later re-released, slightly different, on ICP's debut album Carnival of Carnage. The remaining three tracks were included in the first Forgotten Freshness compilation, while the re-release of said compilation Forgotten Freshness Volumes 1 & 2 included only "Dog Beats", omitting the other two tracks.

The album was reissued on CD at the Gathering of the Juggalos 2000.

== Tracks ==
1. "Ghetto Zone" – 5:58
2. "Wizard of the Hood" – 5:18
3. "Life at Risk" – 4:04
4. "Dog Beats" – 4:51
5. "Ask You Somethin'" (2021 re-release bonus track) – 2:45
