= Halls of Illusions =

Single by Insane Clown Posse featuring Slash

from the album The Great Milenko
- Released: 1997
- Genre: Rap metal, horrorcore
- Length: 4:21
- Songwriters: Joseph Bruce; Mike E. Clark; Joseph Utsler
- Producers: Mike E. Clark; Insane Clown Posse

Insane Clown Posse featuring Slash singles chronology
"The Joker's Wild" (1995)	"Halls of Illusions" (1997)	"Hokus Pokus" (1997)

Music video
- "Halls of Illusions" on YouTube

"Halls of Illusions" is the first single by American hip hop duo Insane Clown Posse from their fourth studio album, The Great Milenko. The song shows their hate towards child abuse and domestic violence and the damage their victims suffer. The lyrics speak about child abusers and woman beaters who take a hellish amusement park ride representing a fun-house to reflect upon their actions. They are shown the consequences of their ways as they pass through the "Halls of Illusions". These illusions show what their lives could have been if they had chosen not to inflict violence and pain upon their families who have been destroyed by the abuse. The clean version of the music video removes all language and graphic violence by changing the lyrics. Guns N' Roses guitarist Slash was featured in the song; he performed background rhythm guitar.

== Charts ==
Chart performance for "Halls of Illusions"
Chart (1998)	Peak position
UK Singles (Official Charts)	56
