= The Only Solution =

Studio album by Cold 187um
- Released: October 22, 2012
- Genres: Gangsta rap, Mafioso rap, hardcore hip hop
- Label: Psychopathic

Cold 187um chronology
Only God Can Judge Me (2011)	The Only Solution (2012)	The Big Hit (2014)

The Only Solution is the fifth album by Cold 187um and his first and only album for Psychopathic Records. Released on October 22, 2012, it is a concept album, focusing on the story of a hired killer, the "Psychopathic Assassin", as he performs his job and pursues revenge against his uncle, Black Swan, who had murdered the Assassin's father.

== Background ==
In 2009, Cold 187 um was invited to perform at the Gathering of the Juggalos, but because of his mother's cancer, he declined the offer. However, he later agreed to develop a project with Insane Clown Posse's Violent J. After releasing Only God Can Judge Me on another label, Violent J proposed that Psychopathic Records release their project, and Cold 187 um agreed to tour with Insane Clown Posse and Twiztid to promote the project.

Psychopathic wanted to develop an album that would combine the talents of Cold 187 um and Psychopathic in a way that would appeal to Juggalos, the label's fanbase, and establish the rapper to their audience, as he was well known for his efforts in gangsta rap, but not previously established to Juggalos.

Additionally, Cold 187 um felt that in order to sign with Psychopathic, he had to create material that would be different from what he produced for his own label, West World Records. During the tour, Cold 187 um and Violent J created the character of a hired killer, and developed the concept of the album as a long-form story. After the tour, it was officially announced that Cold 187 um had signed with Psychopathic.

== Concept and storyline ==
The Only Solution is a concept album which tells the story of an assassin as he develops from a young boy into a hired killer, the "Psychopathic Assassin", who is hired by "The Company" whenever someone "needs to be taken care of". It is prepackaged with a comic book that corresponds with the album's story. Within the storyline, the album's character is identified as "Cold 187um" and "Hutch".

The story begins with Hutch being brought into the business by his father and uncle, who brought Hutch along during "hits" because the targets are more vulnerable when a child is present. Hutch commits his first assassination at the age of 10. At the height of their success, Hutch's uncle, Black Swan, murders his brother out of greed, and Hutch swears to avenge his father by seeking revenge against Black Swan.

The rest of the album's storyline focuses on Cold 187 um in the present day as he performs assassinations of several people, including Father Duckets, a greedy, corrupt preacher, Willie Brosco, who stole money from Cold 187 um's employers, Larry Longhorn, a corrupt judge who proclaims excessive sentences to the plaintiffs that face him, three despicable criminal brothers, and the corrupt Senator Jones, as well as pursuing Black Swan and seeking revenge for his father. The album's storyline concludes with the Psychopathic Assassin's son stating that he is happy as long he is alive and free, a sharp contrast from the Assassin's view that the world is "dangerous" and "full of snakes".

== Production ==
While developing the album, Cold 187 um hand selected instrumentals from 12 previously released songs by Psychopathic artists, including Dark Lotus, Anybody Killa, Twiztid, Blaze Ya Dead Homie and Insane Clown Posse, on the basis of which instrumentals would be appropriate for story-based songs which would form an album-length storyline. Official promotional materials termed the album a "deluxe mixtape" on the basis of this production style. The album's storyline was developed by Violent J, and Cold 187 um wrote all of the lyrics based on this story.

== Release and promotion ==
A panflet included with Insane Clown Posse's album The Mighty Death Pop! listed the release date of The Only Solution as October 9, 2012. However, the album was pushed back to October 22 to coincide with the release of Twiztid's album Abominationz.

Psychopathic's YouTube channel released a series of videos entitled "In the Mind of an Assassin", as well as a music video featuring Cold 187 um rapping over the beat from ICP's cover of the Geto Boys' "Assassins", to promote the release of The Only Solution. The videos depicted Cold 187 um in character as the "Psychopathic Assassin", preparing and performing staged assassinations.

On October 17, the single "An Offer He Can't Refuse", and a series of samples from the album were released. Customers who ordered The Only Solution and Twiztid's Abominationz within two weeks of the albums' release date received an exclusive CD containing audio of Psychopathic's "Psyphers".

On November 28, Psychopathic Records released the first music video from the album, "An Offer He Can't Refuse". Cold 187 um will tour in promotion of the album.

== Reception ==
Professional ratings
Review scores
Source	Rating
Allmusic	3/5 stars
The Daily BLAM!	4/5 stars
Faygoluvers.net	3.5/5 stars
Juggalo News	(favorable)

The Only Solution debuted at #113 on the Billboard Hot 200 Charts, #19 on R&B/Hip-Hop Albums, #6 on Heatseekers Albums, #32 on Independent Albums and #17 on Rap Albums.

Allmusic gave the album three out of five stars. Reviewer David Jeffries wrote, "while this concept goes big time in a Tarantino style with characters and locations providing an Iliad-sized journey, some of the tracks get too tripped up in narrative to be considered pure."

Cold 187 um's association with Insane Clown Posse was criticized by both fans of West Coast hip hop and Juggalos. Cold 187 um responded to the criticism, stating "The Only Solution project was an innovative good idea between myself and Violent J, but everyone is so damn opinionated these days and not going with the idea of the artist’s creativity, the project was harder than it needed to be. We are all independent, we are all against mainstream music, we all should have been one not separate. That goes for both Juggalos and my West Coast Hip Hop fans. We might come from different places but we are all on the same side, fighting the same fight. It’s like anything else in life, if there is no unity the real enemy will always win. End of story."

== Track listing ==
All lyrics are written by Cold 187um.

No.	Title	Music	Length
1.	"Born 2 Kill"	"Follow The Leader" by Dark Lotus	4:51
2.	"Job Well Done"	"Nervous" by Anybody Killa	3:46
3.	"Layn' Low"	"So High" by Twiztid	4:49
4.	"An Offer He Can’t Refuse"	"Murder, Murder, Murder" by Twiztid	4:04
5.	"Swan Song"	"Ka-Boom!" by Dark Lotus	4:27
6.	"Judgement Day"	"Deadman Walking" by Blaze Ya Dead Homie	3:44
7.	"L.A."	"Suicide Hotline" by Insane Clown Posse	4:04
8.	"3 Brothers"	"Chicken Huntin' (Slaughterhouse Mix)" by Insane Clown Posse	4:03
9.	"Swan Sighting"	"Damn Bitch" by Blaze Ya Dead Homie	4:19
10.	"Capitol Hill"	"Marsh Lagoon" by Twiztid	4:11
11.	"Interrogation"	"Truth Dare" by Insane Clown Posse	2:39
12.	"Alive & Free"	"Last Chance" by Anybody Killa	4:16

== Personnel ==
"Born 2 Kill"

- Brian Kuma — producer
- Violent J — additional production, engineering, narration vocals
- Joe Strange — assistant engineering
- Legz Diamond — additional production, vocals
- Ashley "Lil Pig" Horak — backing vocals
- Doe Dubbla — backing vocals
- Matt Reznik — backing vocals
- Kodi Sparkman — backing vocals
- Corporal Robinson — backing vocals
- Sugar Slam — backing vocals

"Job Well Done"

- Brian Kuma — producer
- Violent J — additional production, engineering
- Joe Strange — assistant engineering
- Lez Diamond — additional production, vocals
- Ashley "Lil Pig" Horak — backing vocals
- Doe Dubbla — backing vocals
- Matt Reznik — backing vocals

"Laying Low"

- Fritz the Cat — producer
- Brian Kuma — additional production, engineering
- Violent J — additional production, engineering
- Joe Strange — assistant engineering
- Lez Diamond — additional production, vocals
- Ashley "Lil Pig" Horak — backing vocals
- Doe Dubbla — backing vocals
- Matt Reznik — backing vocals
- Christine Lewis — backing vocals

"An Offer He Can't Refuse"

- R.O.C. — producer
- Brian Kuma — additional production, engineering
- Violent J — additional production, engineering, narration vocals
- Joe Strange — assistant engineering
- Lez Diamond — additional production, vocals
- Ashley "Lil Pig" Horak — backing vocals
- Doe Dubbla — backing vocals

"Swan Song"

- Fritz the Cat — producer
- Brian Kuma — additional production, engineering
- Violent J — additional production, engineering, narration vocals
- Joe Strange — assistant engineering
- Lez Diamond — additional production, vocals
- Ashley "Lil Pig" Horak — backing vocals
- Doe Dubbla — backing vocals

"Judgement Day"

- Mike E. Clark — producer
- Brian Kuma — additional production, engineering
- Violent J — additional production, engineering, narration vocals
- Joe Strange — assistant engineering
- Lez Diamond — additional production, vocals
- Ashley "Lil Pig" Horak — backing vocals
- Doe Dubbla — backing vocals

"L.A."

- Fritz the Cat — producer
- Brian Kuma — additional production, engineering, backing vocals
- Violent J — additional production, engineering, narration vocals
- Joe Strange — assistant engineering
- Lez Diamond — additional production, vocals
- Ashley "Lil Pig" Horak — backing vocals
- Doe Dubbla — backing vocals

"3 Brothers"

- Mike E. Clark — producer
- Brian Kuma — additional production, engineering
- Violent J — additional production, engineering, narration vocals
- Joe Strange — assistant engineering
- Lez Diamond — additional production, vocals
- Ashley "Lil Pig" Horak — backing vocals
- Doe Dubbla — backing vocals
- Sugar Slam — backing vocals

"Swan Sighting"

- Mike E. Clark — producer
- Brian Kuma — additional production, engineering
- Violent J — additional production, engineering, narration vocals
- Joe Strange — assistant engineering
- Lez Diamond — additional production, vocals
- Ashley "Lil Pig" Horak — backing vocals
- Doe Dubbla — backing vocals

"Capitol Hill"

- Fritz the Cat — producer
- Brian Kuma — additional production, engineering
- Violent J — additional production, engineering, narration vocals
- Joe Strange — assistant engineering
- Lez Diamond — additional production, vocals
- Ashley "Lil Pig" Horak — backing vocals
- Doe Dubbla — backing vocals

"Interrogation"

- Mike E. Clark — producer
- Brian Kuma — additional production, engineering, backing vocals
- Violent J — additional production, engineering, narration vocals
- Joe Strange — assistant engineering, lawyer vocals
- Lez Diamond — additional production, vocals
- Ashley "Lil Pig" Horak — backing vocals
- Doe Dubbla — backing vocals
- Matt Reznik — backing vocals

"Alive & Free"

- Brian Kuma — producer, engineering, backing vocals
- Violent J — additional production, engineering, narration vocals
- Joe Strange — assistant engineering
- Lez Diamond — additional production, vocals
- Ashley "Lil Pig" Horak — backing vocals

== Chart history ==
Chart (2012)	Peak position
US Billboard 200	133
US Top R&B/Hip-Hop Albums (Billboard)	19
US Top Rap Albums (Billboard)	17
US Independent Albums (Billboard)	32
US Heatseekers Albums (Billboard)	6
