= Hokus Pokus (song) =

Single by Insane Clown Posse

from the album The Great Milenko
- Released: June 1, 1997
- Recorded: 1996–1997
- Genre: Comedy hip hop; horrorcore
- Length: 4:21
- Label: Island; Psychopathic
- Songwriters: Violent J; Shaggy 2 Dope; Mike E. Clark
- Producers: Mike E. Clark; Jason Nevins (remix producer)

Insane Clown Posse singles chronology
"Halls of Illusions" (1997)	"Hokus Pokus" (1997)	"Santa's a Fat Bitch" (1997)

Music video
- "Hokus Pokus" on YouTube

"Hokus Pokus" is a song written by Insane Clown Posse and Mike E. Clark for the duo's 1997 studio album, The Great Milenko. A music video was produced for the Jason Nevins "Headhunta'z Remix" of the song in 1997. The single peaked at number 53 on the UK Singles Chart the following year. The song's chorus uses the "Streets of Cairo" melody.

== Release ==
"Hokus Pokus" was released in 1997 as the second single from Insane Clown Posse's studio album The Great Milenko. The release was exclusive to Europe as a part of Island Records' attempt to promote the group internationally. The single was released in three different versions, with each featuring a remix of the song by Jason Nevins entitled "Hokus Pokus (Headhunta'z Remix)". The single peaked at number 54 on the UK Singles Chart that year. A vinyl version of the single was also released in Europe later that year.

Nevins' "Headhunta'z Remix" was later featured on Insane Clown Posse's rarities album Forgotten Freshness Volumes 1 & 2.

== Music video ==
A music video for "Hokus Pokus (Nevins Headhunta'z Mix)" was produced in 1997 after the release of The Great Milenko. The entire video was filmed during the day, as to avoid overtime costs. It features a comical portrayal of Insane Clown Posse destroying a shoe store before being pursued by security guards. The video also included appearances by hip hop artists Twiztid and Myzery.

== Commercial performance ==
On September 6, 2022, the song certified Gold by the RIAA, signifying sales of 500,000 equivalent units.

== Track listing ==
Hokus Pokus (Green)
No.	Title	Length
1.	"Hokus Pokus" (Headhunta'z edit)	3:54
2.	"My Kind of Bitch"	5:33
3.	"Prom Queen"	4:45
4.	"Skitsofrantic"	3:30
Total length:		17:42

Hokus Pokus (Orange)
No.	Title	Length
1.	"Hokus Pokus" (Headhunta'z edit; intro 2)	3:54
2.	"Hokus Pokus" (Headhunta'z instrumental)	3:48
3.	"Hokus Pokus" (LP version)	4:22
4.	"Prom Queen"	5:33
Total length:		17:37

Hokus Pokus (Red)
No.	Title	Length
1.	"Hokus Pokus" (Headhunta'z edit)	3:54
2.	"Hokus Pokus" (radio edit)	3:40
3.	"Hokus Pokus" (Headhunta'z instrumental)	3:48
4.	"Hokus Pokus" (LP version)	4:22
Total length:		15:44

Hokus Pokus (Vinyl)
No.	Title	Length
1.	"Hokus Pokus" (Headhunta'z edit; intro 2)	3:54
2.	"Hokus Pokus" (Headhunta'z instrumental)	3:48
3.	"Hokus Pokus" (Headhunta'z edit; intro 1)	3:54
4.	"Hokus Pokus" (LP version)	4:22
Total length:		15:58

== Charts ==
Chart performance for "Hokus Pokus"
Chart (1998)	Peak position
UK Singles Chart	53

== Certifications ==
Certifications for "Hokus Pokus"
Region	Certification	Certified units/sales
United States (RIAA)	Gold	500,000^{‡}
^{‡} Sales+streaming figures based on certification alone.
