= Chicken Huntin' =

Single by Insane Clown Posse

from the album Riddle Box
- Released: August 28, 1995
- Recorded: 1993
- Genre: Midwest hip-hop; horrorcore; rap rock
- Length: 4:08
- Label: Battery/Psychopathic
- Songwriters: Joseph Bruce, Mike E. Clark, Joseph Modeliste, Art Neville, Leo Nocentelli, George Porter Jr
- Producers: ICP; Mike Clark

Insane Clown Posse singles chronology
| "Psychopathic" (1992) | "Chicken Huntin'" (1995) | "The Joker's Wild" (1995) |

"Chicken Huntin'" is a single by hip hop duo Insane Clown Posse, from their second studio album, Ringmaster. The "Slaughter House Mix", from the group's third studio album, Riddle Box, has become one the duo's most popular songs.

== Content ==
The lyrics describe Insane Clown Posse meeting and killing multiple racist rednecks, referred to as 'Chickens'.

The concept stems from the group's anti-bigotry philosophy, based on various experiences witnessed by group member Violent J. As a teenager, he had briefly lived in Bonnie Doone, North Carolina, a trailer park town just outside Fort Bragg, where his brother Robert had been staying with the U.S. Army. There, Joseph witnessed firsthand the hatred and open racism directed toward African American citizens, as well as the minorities serving in the Army, and became disgusted and infuriated with the actions that took place.

In an interview with Murder Dog, Bruce said that the song is not directed toward all Southerners. He stated that "if you’re a redneck and you're not a racist, then obviously you know that I'm not talkin’ about you. But [in the song] I'm talkin' about the racist fuckin' rednecks that fuck their daughters. It just makes me sick."

== Music videos ==
After signing a distribution deal with Jive Records' short-lived imprint, Battery Records, the group received funds to produce a music video for the song. Joseph and Robert Bruce developed their own concept for the video, but the director changed their plans, and the final concept instead featured Insane Clown Posse performing actions which Joseph Bruce later described as "[Some of] the stupidest thing[s] I had ever heard of." Because the group and the label were disappointed with the video, it was not publicly released at the time, although it later appeared on Psychopathic: The Videos in 2007.

The music video for the "Slaughter House Mix" was shot at the State Theatre now known as the Fillmore, during an actual Insane Clown Posse concert. The director of the video, former Cro-Mags rhythm guitarist Parris Mayhew, wanted Insane Clown Posse to perform the song several times in order to get the footage from all angles, but the duo refused to repeat the song because it was an actual concert, and not just a video shoot. The video was shot with the group performing the song only once. The original version of "Chicken Huntin'" was performed for the video shoot, because their fans were not yet familiar with the remix. This made Jive furious, but there were no editing problems, and Violent J later referred to the video as "our freshest video ever."

== Remixes and cover versions ==
As the group began production on its third studio album, Riddle Box, Jive Records produced a remix of the song which was rejected by Insane Clown Posse, leading the group to produce its own remix, the "Slaughter House Mix", which appeared on the new album. In 2009, Mike E. Clark produced a third remix for Psychopathic Murder Mix Volume 1. The same year, a cover of the song by Esham and Poe Whosaine appeared on Smith's "Bomb Ass Podcast" in June. The beat of the "Slaughter House Mix" was reused by Cold 187um in his song "3 Brothers", from the 2012 album The Only Solution.

== Track listing ==
| No. | Title | Lyrics | Music | Producer(s) | Length |
|---|---|---|---|---|---|
| 1. | "Chicken Huntin' (Slaughterhouse Mix)" | ICP | Mike E. Clark/D. Greenburg/H. Dodd/M. Niles | Mike E. Clark, D. Greenburg, H. Dodd, M. Niles and ICP |
| 2. | "Chicken Huntin' (Slaughterhouse Inst)" | ICP | Mike E. Clark/D. Greenburg/H. Dodd/M. Niles | Mike E. Clark, D. Greenburg, H. Dodd, M. Niles and ICP |
| 3. | "I Didn't Mean to Kill Him" | ICP | Mike E. Clark | Mike E. Clark and ICP |
| 4. | "Fabulous" | ICP | Mike E. Clark | Mike E. Clark and ICP |
| 5. | "Riddle Box Sampler" | ICP | Mike E. Clark | Mike E. Clark and ICP |
| 6. | "Chicken Huntin' (Original Recipe)" | ICP | Mike E. Clark | Mike E. Clark and ICP |
