= Beverly Kills 50187 =

EP by Insane Clown Posse
- Released: July 16, 1993
- Recorded: 1992–1993
- Studios: The Disk; Hells Doors Studio; Rythmatic Studio
- Genres: Gangsta rap; horrorcore
- Length: 40:03
- Label: Psychopathic Records
- Producers: Chris Conley; Esham; Insane Clown Posse; Mike E. Clark

Insane Clown Posse chronology
Carnival of Carnage (1992)	Beverly Kills 50187 (1993)	Ringmaster (1994)

Insane Clown Posse chronology
Beverly Kills 50187 (1993)	The Terror Wheel (1994)

Professional ratings
Review scores
Source	Rating
AllMusic	2.5/5 stars
RapReviews	5/10

Beverly Kills 50187 is the debut EP by American hip hop group Insane Clown Posse. It was released on July 16, 1993, via Psychopathic Records as the first "sideshow" entry in the group's Dark Carnival saga. The group felt that they should release EPs in between their studio albums during the Dark Carnival series, in order to build and satisfy their fanbase. It is the second overall release by Insane Clown Posse.

Recording sessions took place at Rythmatic Studio, Hells Doors Studio, and The Disk. Production was handled by Mike E. Clark, Esham, Chris Conley and I.C.P. themselves. It features guest appearance from Esham on the song "Chop! Chop!", and the only appearance of temporary member Greez-E, who contributes on "In the Haughhh!" and "17 Dead". Original member John Kickjazz, Shaggy 2 Dope's brother, left the group shortly before the release of Carnival of Carnage; Greez-E, a fan that ICP met earlier that year, joined as John's replacement. Greez-E parted ways with the group after the release of the EP.

The answering machine message at the end of "The Stalker" is an actual message left by an ex-boyfriend who was stalking Violent J's then-girlfriend. The cover art, like the group's "Joker's Card" albums, was drawn by Shaggy 2 Dope. This is also the first time Utsler began going by the stage name "Shaggy 2 Dope", previously going by just "2 Dope".

== Track listing ==
No.	Title	Writer(s)	Producer(s)	Length
1.	"Beverly Kills 50187"	Joseph Bruce; Joseph Utsler	Insane Clown Posse	5:43
2.	"17 Dead"	Bruce	Esham; Violent J	6:44
3.	"The Stalker"	Bruce	Mike E. Clark; Violent J	7:49
4.	"In the Haughhh!"	Bruce; Utsler; Olson	Mike E. Clark; Chris Conley; Violent J	6:15
5.	"Chop! Chop!" (featuring Esham)	Bruce	Esham	5:02
6.	"Joke Your Mind"	Bruce	Mike E. Clark; Violent J	8:30
Total length:				40:03

== Personnel ==
- Joseph "Violent J" Bruce – vocals, producer (tracks: 1–4, 6)
- Joseph "Shaggy 2 Dope" Utsler – vocals, scratches (tracks: 3, 4), producer (track 1)
- Erik "Greez-E" Olson – vocals (tracks: 2, 4)
- Esham A. Smith – vocals (track 5), producer, and engineering (tracks: 2, 5)
- Chris Conley – guitar and producer (track 4)
- Scott Summers – engineering and mixing (track 1)
- Mike E. Clark – producer (tracks: 3, 4, 6), mixing (tracks: 2, 3, 5, 6), and engineering (tracks: 3, 4, 6)
- Alex Abbiss – management
