= Forgotten Freshness Volumes 1 & 2 =

Compilation album by Insane Clown Posse
- Released: August 11, 1998
- Recorded: 1991–1998
- Genres: Horrorcore, hip hop
- Length: 102:52
- Labels: Psychopathic/Island/PolyGram Records; 524 552

Insane Clown Posse chronology
The Great Milenko (1997)	Forgotten Freshness Volumes 1 & 2 (1998)	The Amazing Jeckel Brothers (1999)

Professional ratings
Review scores
Source	Rating
Allmusic	2/5 stars
Rolling Stone	1.5/5 stars

Forgotten Freshness Volumes 1 & 2 is a rarities album by American hip hop group Insane Clown Posse. Released in 1998, it features unreleased and lost tracks that are harder to find elsewhere. It also contains some tracks that were remixed or changed. Before this album's release the ICP released Forgotten Freshness in 1995, but because of sample-clearing problems it was only released in the Detroit area and the Midwest. Many of the tracks on that album appeared again on these albums for wider distribution purposes. (Note: "Ghetto Zone", "Life At Risk", and "Ask You Somethin" were not featured on the re-releases, with "Ask You Somethin" not appearing on any other release until the 2020 reissue of the Dog Beats EP. The edits of "Southwest Strangla" and "3 Rings" are also exclusive to the 1995 compilation.)

Three tracks, "Life at a Risk", "Ghetto Zone", and "Ask You Somethin'" do not appear on this album, despite appearing on the original Forgotten Freshness. It is the 2nd installment in the group's "Forgotten Freshness album series", their 3rd compilation album and their 11th overall release.

== Songs history and content ==
Forgotten Freshness Volumes 1 & 2 features several scrapped songs intended for some of the group's previous albums. The songs "Fat Sweaty Betty," "Willy Bubba," and "I Didn't Mean To Kill 'Em" were all intended to be released on Riddle Box. "Fat Sweaty Betty" was eventually given away as a single at the group's two "Mental Warp" shows. The song "House of Wonders" was originally set to be released on The Great Milenko, but was later released on Mutilation Mix.

"Piggy Pie (Old School)" is the original version of the song "Piggie Pie," found on The Great Milenko. The Walt Disney Company, owner of the group's label at the time, asked that the lyrics to the original be changed, threatening to not release the album otherwise. The song "Southwest Strangla" was planned to be released on Shaggy 2 Dope's second solo album Shaggs The Clown, but the entire project was scrapped. In the beginning of the song, a news brief is played about the actual looting of Northwest Airlines Flight 255 which crashed on I-94 in Detroit in 1987.

The album also features two remixes, "Mr. Johnson's Head" and "Hokus Pokus." "Dead Pumpkins" was the first Hallowicked single given away in 1994, while "Mr. Rotten Treats" and "Halloween on Military Street" were the 1995 and 1996 singles. With a change in beat and lyrics, the song "Hey, Vato" became "Wagon Wagon" found on the Ringmaster album. Some lyrics from the song are also found on the song "Who Asked You," also on Ringmaster. This is currently the only ICP album under Island Records that you can pick up on Psychopathic's official merchandise website, Hatchetgear.

== Track listing ==
=== Disc 1 ===
No.	Title	Music	Length
1.	"Hey Vato"	scrapped from Ringmaster	5:05
2.	"Dead Pumpkins"	from Hallowicked 1994	4:57
3.	"Fat Sweaty Betty"	scrapped from Riddle Box	4:42
4.	"Willy Bubba"	scrapped from Riddle Box	3:40
5.	"Graveyard" (Project Born)	from Born Dead	6:14
6.	"Fuck Off!"	from Fuck Off!	4:38
7.	"I Didn't Mean To Kill 'Em"	scrapped from Riddle Box from B-side Chicken Huntin' single	3:59
8.	"Southwest Strangla"	from unreleased Shaggs The Clown	4:43
9.	"Santa's a Fat Bitch"	from A Carnival Christmas	4:25
10.	"Witching Hour" (Myzery)	from Para La Isla	5:36

=== Disc 2 ===
No.	Title	Music	Length
1.	"Mr. Johnson's Head [Remix]"	scrapped from The Great Milenko, from Hallowicked 1997	6:12
2.	"Clown Love"	from Fuck Off!	3:45
3.	"Hokus Pokus [Headhunta'z Remix]"	remixed by Jason Nevins	3:57
4.	"Red Christmas"	from A Carnival Christmas	4:28
5.	"House of Wonders"	scrapped from The Great Milenko / from Mutilation Mix	3:10
6.	"Mr. Rotten Treats"	from Hallowicked 1995	5:52
7.	"Piggy Pie (Old School)"	scrapped from The Great Milenko	4:24
8.	"I'm Not Alone"	from Fuck Off!	5:07
9.	"85 Bucks An Hour" (Twiztid)	from Mostasteless	3:18
10.	"Halloween On Military Street"	from Hallowicked 1996	5:18
11.	"Dog Beats"	from Dog Beats	5:00
12.	"Mental Warp"	scrapped from "Riddle Box" from Tunnel of Love (EP)	4:30

== Chart positions ==
Chart (1998)	Peak Position
Billboard 200	46

== Certifications ==
Region	Certification	Certified units/sales
United States (RIAA)	Gold	500,000^{^}
^{^} Shipments figures based on certification alone.
