= Tunnel of Love (EP) =

EP by Insane Clown Posse
- Released: June 11, 1996
- Recorded: 1996
- Studio: The Fun House
- Length: 40:07
- Label: Psychopathic
- Producers: Insane Clown Posse; Mike E. Clark

Insane Clown Posse EPs chronology
A Carnival Christmas (1994)	Tunnel of Love (1996)	Dark Carnival Action Figures (2000)

Insane Clown Posse chronology
Riddle Box (1995)	Tunnel of Love (1996)	Mutilation Mix (1997)

Tunnel of Love is the fourth extended play by American hip hop group Insane Clown Posse. It was released on June 11, 1996, through Psychopathic Records, serving as the third and final "sideshow" entry in the group's Dark Carnival saga. The EP was recorded at the Fun House with Mike E. Clark, who produced the album together with ICP.

== Background ==
Unsatisfied with their contract with Jive Records, Insane Clown Posse's manager, Alex Abbiss, set up a deal which would sign the group with Hollywood Records. During the two days between their Jive contract expiring and being signed to Hollywood Records, ICP recorded and independently released The Tunnel of Love EP on Psychopathic Records. The EP was released June 11, 1996 and consisted of "love songs" performed in the duo's trademark style. Like The Terror Wheel, there is a hidden track at the end which contains a phone number, which could be called to reveal the name of the next Joker's Card, The Great Milenko.

== Release and reception ==
Professional ratings
Review scores
Source	Rating
AllMusic	3/5 stars
RapReviews	6/10

Tunnel of Love was released with an alternate pornographic album cover, which became rare and much sought after among fans.

To promote the EP, Psychopathic sent out a pink Tunnel of Love van with flowers on it. However, this promotional tactic proved to be incomprehensible to many people, who did not understand what the van was promoting, and onlookers yelled homophobic insults at the drivers. After much disagreement between the heads of Psychopathic Records, label don Billy Bill pulled the van over and removed the wrapping promoting the EP.

The album was released in an alternate version with a pornographic album cover, and a bonus track, "Mental Warp". The cover was derived from a pornographic film VHS cover which depicted an actor with an erect penis standing next to two women, one of which is holding the erection in her hand. The actor's face was replaced by Shaggy 2 Dope's. Because no stores would stock the album with this cover and it was sold mostly at Insane Clown Posse's concerts, this edition became rare and sought after by fans.

Allmusic did not review the album, but gave it 3 out of 5 stars. "Mental Warp", the bonus track from the XXX edition of the album, also appeared on the compilation Forgotten Freshness Volumes 1 & 2. The songs "Cotton Candy" and "Super Balls" appeared in the film Big Money Hustlas. The song "Super Balls" originated the Juggalo slang "Whoop whoop!", which is used as a greeting among fans. The greeting and the song were also referenced in Twiztid's song "Meat Cleaver", which appeared on their 1997 debut Mostasteless. The pornographic alternate cover is discussed in the film Shockumentary by parents concerned about ICP's music. The track "Prom Queen" became a sleeper hit on TikTok in 2024.

== Track listing ==
All lyrics are written by Joseph Bruce and Joseph Utsler; all music is composed by Mike E. Clark.

No.	Title	Length
1.	"Intro"	1:21
2.	"Cotton Candy"	4:35
3.	"Super Balls"	5:32
4.	"Ninja"	5:51
5.	"Stomp"	2:49
6.	"Prom Queen"	5:32
7.	"My Kind of Bitch"	4:46
8.	"When I Get Out/You're a Stupid Ass"	9:48
Total length:		40:07

XXX version bonus track
No.	Title	Length
9.	"Mental Warp"	4:31

== Personnel ==
- Joseph "Violent J" Bruce – lyrics, vocals, producer
- Joseph "Shaggy 2 Dope" Utsler – lyrics, vocals, producer
- Mike E. Clark – producer, recording, engineering, mixing
- Bob Alford – photography
- Gary Arnett – layout
