= Carnival of Carnage =

Studio album by Insane Clown Posse
- Released: October 18, 1992
- Recorded: 1991–1992
- Studios: Miller Midi Productions (Detroit, Michigan); The Tempermill Studio (Ferndale, Michigan)
- Genres: Horrorcore, gangsta rap
- Length: 66:17
- Label: Psychopathic
- Producers: Joseph Bruce; Mike Clark; Esham; Chuck Miller

Insane Clown Posse chronology
Dog Beats (1991)	Carnival of Carnage (1992)	Ringmaster (1994)

Singles from Carnival of Carnage
- 1. "Psychopathic" Released: 1994

Carnival of Carnage is the debut studio album by the American hip-hop duo Insane Clown Posse, released on October 18, 1992, by Psychopathic Records.

Recording sessions for the album took place from 1991 to 1992 at Miller Midi Productions and The Tempermill Studio. The album is the first Joker's Card in the group's Dark Carnival mythology. The album's lyrics describe the Carnival of Carnage as a representation of the violence that occurs within the ghettos, which takes the form of a traveling carnival to enact the same brutality on the upper class.

Carnival of Carnage was the first album on which Insane Clown Posse collaborated with producer Mike E. Clark, who would work with the group throughout much of their career. It features guest appearances by popular Detroit rappers Esham and Kid Rock. The album features the only recorded appearances of member John Kickjazz (John Utsler), who left the group prior to the album's release.

An accompanying extended play titled Beverly Kills 50187 was released on July 16, 1993. The group felt that they should release EPs in between their studio albums during the Dark Carnival series, in order to build and satisfy their fanbase.

== Conception ==
=== Background ===
Joseph Bruce and Joseph Utsler formed a hip hop group in 1990. Under the stage names Violent J, 2 Dope, and John Kickjazz, the group began performing at local night clubs under the name of their gang, Inner City Posse. By late 1991, the group had invested more money into production than was covered by returns. They decided that their gangsta rap style was the cause of the problem: most emcees at the time used similar styles, making it difficult for Inner City Posse to distinguish itself stylistically. Bruce suggested the band instead adapt a style similar to the hallucinatory, surrealistic "acid rap" of fellow Detroit rapper Esham, in a bid to have Detroit represent acid rap, much as Los Angeles represented gangsta rap. The group agreed, but not to copying the style of Esham closely. Instead, they suggested using horror-themed lyrics as an emotional outlet for all their negative life experiences. They were also unanimous in deciding not to rap openly about Satan, which Esham often did.

After the change in musical style, the group decided that it needed a new name. Utsler suggested keeping the "I.C.P." initials to inform the community that Inner City Posse was not defunct, an idea to which the group agreed. Several names were considered before Bruce recalled his dream of a clown running around in Delray, which became the inspiration for the group's new name, Insane Clown Posse. The other members agreed, deciding that they would take on this new genre and name, and would all don face paint due to the success of their former clown-painted hype man.

=== Recording ===
Carnival of Carnage began recording at Miller Midi Productions in Detroit, Michigan with Chuck Miller producing and mastering the album. Miller charged the group US$6,000 to produce the songs "Red Neck Hoe," "Psychopathic," "Your Rebel Flag," and part of "Night of the Axe." Seeing that they were being overcharged, Alex Abbiss made his first major managerial move by finding another producer, Mike E. Clark. The group finished recording the album with Clark at The Tempermill Studio in Ferndale, Michigan. Clark mastered his part of the album at Rythmatic Studio, and continued to work with the group throughout their career.

Original group member John Kickjazz appeared on the songs "Your Rebel Flag", "Psychopathic", "Blacken' Your Eyes", "Wizard of the Hood", "Red Neck Hoe" and "Taste". "Carnival of Carnage" was originally recorded by Esham at Hells Doors Studio, but he pronounced "carnage" as "carnicks" and refused to redo it. The final version of the song was recorded by Joseph Bruce over a reversed recording of the original.

Awesome Dre was originally going to do a verse on "Taste." While Insane Clown Posse waited in the studio for him to arrive, Esham suggested that he appear on the track instead for the same amount of money, and the group allowed him to record a verse. Esham was paid $500 for his appearance. Kid Rock demanded a hundred more than Esham, and was paid $600 to appear on "Is That You?" He showed up to record the song intoxicated, but re-recorded his vocals and record scratching the following day.

=== Joker's Cards ===
Carnival of Carnage is the first Joker's Card in Insane Clown Posse's Dark Carnival concept album series. The Dark Carnival is a concept of the afterlife in which souls are sent to a form of limbo while waiting to be sent to heaven or hell based on their individual actions. These concepts are related by Insane Clown Posse in a series of albums called the six Joker's Cards. Each of the six Joker's Cards relate to a specific character — an entity of the Dark Carnival — that tries to "save the human soul" by showing the wicked inside of one's self.

"Ghetto Freak Show" (sample)
"Ghetto Freak Show", from the group's 1992 album Carnival of Carnage.

This Joker's Card is a representation of the ghettos and the violence that occurs within them. It takes the form of a traveling carnival which releases the same brutality on those who have ignored the inner cities' cries for help. The Card issues a warning against the upper-class and government's negligence toward the lower classes. The cover of Carnival of Carnage was drawn by Joseph Utsler, who would later create artwork for the rest of the albums in the Joker's Cards series.

=== Samples ===
- "Carnival of Carnage" samples "Life" by Sly and the Family Stone
- "The Juggla" samples "Kiss" by Prince and the Revolution and "The Show Must Go On" by Three Dog Night
- "Red Neck Hoe" samples "City, Country, City" by War
- "Is That You?" samples "Back from the Dead" and "Yo-da-lin in the Valley" by Kid Rock
- "Psychopathic" samples "Halloween Theme - Main Title" by John Carpenter, "The Murder" by Bernard Herrmann, and "More Bounce to the Ounce" by Zapp
- "Blackin' Your Eyes" samples "I Wanna Sex You Up" by Color Me Badd and "Funky President (People It's Bad)" by James Brown
- "Never Had it Made" samples "The Wizard" by Black Sabbath and "Pass the Mic" by Beastie Boys
- "Ghetto Freak Show" samples "I'd Rather be Dead" by Esham
- "Taste" samples "Brother Green (the Disco King)" by Roy Ayers Ubiquity, "Word After Word" by Esham, "The Crunge" by Led Zeppelin, "Melting Pot" by Booker T. & the M.G.'s and "I Believe in Miracles" by the Jackson Sisters

=== Lyricism ===
Joseph Bruce uses elements of political hip hop throughout the album. Many of his lyrics were derived from his experiences of growing up in a poor family that was neglected by the government. He and his brother Robert used to escape from their impoverished reality by gathering themselves in a forest called "Picker Forest". Joe cites "Picker Forest" as a strong influence on the Dark Carnival mythology which began with this album. The themes of the Dark Carnival also derived from a dream Bruce had shortly after the group adopted its new name, in which spirits in a traveling carnival appeared to him.

"Red Neck Hoe" and "Your Rebel Flag" stem from the group's anti-bigotry philosophy, based on various experiences witnessed by Bruce. As a teenager, he had briefly lived in Bonnie Doone, North Carolina, a trailer park town just outside Fort Bragg, where his brother Robert had been staying with the U.S. Army. There, Joseph witnessed open racism directed toward African American citizens, as well as the minorities serving in the Army, and became disgusted and infuriated with the actions that took place. "Wizard of the Hood" was originally written by Bruce sometime in the late 1980s. The first recorded version of the song appeared on the Intelligence and Violence EP under the name "Wizard of Delray." The Carnival of Carnage version is derived from a 1991 recording which appeared on the EP Dog Beats.

== Release ==
Just weeks prior to the release of their album, John left the group because he felt that it was "taking up too much of [his] life." When Bruce and Utsler attempted to call a meeting to talk about the issues, John did not attend. Carnival of Carnage was released on October 18, 1992, with distribution within a 120-mile (190 km) radius of Detroit. Carnival of Carnage sold 17 copies on its release date. The number would become a reoccurring theme in Insane Clown Posse's work throughout much of the following decade. A condensed extended play featuring eight selected tracks from Carnival of Carnage was pressed on vinyl in hopes that DJs would play the songs in Detroit-area nightclubs. When Carnival of Carange was released, Psychopathic records printed it onto cassette tapes, as they could not afford to press CDs for the album. It was released onto CD in 1994 along with their second album Ringmaster, and sold "twice as fast."

A remastered CD copy of the album was included in the 2015 box set The First Six, along with Ringmaster, Riddle Box, The Great Milenko, The Amazing Jeckel Brothers, The Wraith: Shangri-la, Hell's Pit, and an exclusive bonus CD House of Wax.

== Reception ==
Professional ratings
Review scores
Source	Rating
AllMusic	3/5 stars
Rolling Stone	1/5 stars
The Rolling Stone Album Guide	1/5 stars

Although Carnival of Carnage was not reviewed at the time of its release, later reviews of the album have been unfavorable. AllMusic reviewer Stephen Thomas Erlewine gave the album three out of five stars, comparing the group's performance on the album to "a third-rate Beastie Boys supported by a cut-rate Faith No More, all tempered with the sensibility that made Gwar cult heroes—only with [...] more sexism and jokes that are supposed to be street, but wind up sounding racist", but stating that the album would appeal to fans of the group. In The Great Rock Discography, Martin Charles Strong gave the album four out of ten stars. The album received one star out of five in The New Rolling Stone Album Guide, in which Ben Sisario panned it (along with the rest of the group's discography before The Great Milenko) as "gangsta-inspired wigga posturing".

== Legacy ==
In 1997, Twiztid released a cover of the song "First Day Out" on the duo's debut album, Mostasteless. In 1998, the album was reissued by Island Records without the tracks "Blackin' Your Eyes" and "Night of the Axe." The original version continues to be sold by Psychopathic Records. By 2010, the album had sold well enough to become eligible for gold certification by the RIAA. In the Aqua Teen Hunger Force episode "Juggalo", Bruce and Utsler appear as themselves during a trial after Master Shake commits suicide. George Lowe asks "Mr. 2 Dope" to read lyrics from "Blackin' Your Eyes".

== 25th anniversary ==
In 2017, it was announced that Insane Clown Posse was going to perform the album in its entirety at the "El Club" (which holds 600 people). El Club is located in southwest Detroit. It is directly across the street from Clark Park; the park is where the members of ICP hung out when they were younger. It was also announced that the performance would only be a one-time event, and tickets would be $250; all proceeds going directly to the people making the documentary about John Kickjazz titled The Third Clown. It was also said that John and Shaggy 2 Dope's little brother Tre Pound of Chop Shop would fill in for John. Later on it was announced that for the first time in 25 years Inner City Posse would be performing, and they would wear no makeup. Also a 25th anniversary vinyl version will be available. On August 25, 2017, the lineup for the show was announced, including Rude Boys son DJ Carlito performing (playing music) in between sets, as well as an after party at "MJ's":

== Track listing ==
All tracks are written by Joseph Bruce except where otherwise noted.

Side One: Sanity
No.	Title	Writer(s)	Producer(s)	Length
1.	"Intro"			1:20
2.	"Carnival of Carnage"	Bruce and Smith	Bruce and Smith	2:33
3.	"The Juggla"		Clark and Bruce	4:55
4.	"First Day Out"	Bruce and Utsler	Clark and Bruce	4:21
5.	"Red Neck Hoe"	Bruce and Utsler	Miller and Bruce	4:50
6.	"Wizard of the Hood"	Bruce and Utsler	Miller and Bruce	5:24
7.	"Guts on the Ceiling"		Clark and Bruce	4:25
8.	"Is That You?" (featuring Kid Rock)	Bruce and Ritchie	Clark and Ritchie	4:34
Total length:				32:22

Side Two: Insanity
No.	Title	Writer(s)	Producer(s)	Length
9.	"Night of the Axe"		Miller and Bruce	5:00
10.	"Psychopathic"		Miller and Bruce	4:43
11.	"Blackin' Your Eyes"	Bruce and Utsler	Smith and Bruce	4:40
12.	"Never Had It Made"		Clark, Bruce, and Smith	5:45
13.	"Your Rebel Flag"	Bruce and Utsler	Miller and Bruce	4:24
14.	"Ghetto Freak Show"		Smith and Bruce	4:14
15.	"Taste" (featuring Jumpsteady, Capitol E., Nate The Mack and Esham)	J. Bruce, R. Bruce, Utsler, Williams, Perry, and Smith	Clark and Bruce	5:09
Total length:				33:55

== Personnel ==
- Joseph "Violent J" Bruce – vocals, production (tracks: 2–7, 9–15)
- Joseph "2 Dope" Utsler – vocals, scratching
- John Utsler "Kickjazz" – vocals (tracks: 5, 13, 15)
- Mike E. Clark – production (tracks: 3–4, 7–8, 12, 15)
- Chuck Miller – production (tracks: 5–6, 9–10, 13)
- Esham A. Smith – feature (track: 15), production (tracks: 1, 11–12, 14)
- Robert "Kid Rock" Ritchie – feature (track: 8), scratching (track: 8)
- Robert "Jumpsteady" Bruce – feature (track: 15)
- Erik "Capitol E" Perry – feature (track: 15)
- Nate "The Mack" Williams – feature (track: 15)
- John "Kid Villain" Rode – feature (track: 6)
