= The Shining (Violent J album) =

Studio album by Violent J
- Released: April 28, 2009
- Recorded: 2008–2009
- Studio: Cabin In The Woods (Detroit, MI); The Fun House (Michigan)
- Genre: Rap rock; horrorcore
- Label: Psychopathic
- Producer: Mike E. Clark; Violent J

Violent J chronology
The Shining (2009)	Bloody Sunday (2023)

Professional ratings
Review scores
Source	Rating
AllMusic	3/5 stars

The Shining is the debut solo full-length studio album by American rapper and record producer Violent J. It was released on April 28, 2009, through Psychopathic Records. Recording sessions took place at the Cabin In The Woods Studio and the Fun House Studio in Michigan. Production was handled by Mike E. Clark and Violent J himself. It features guest appearances from Esham, Necro and Shaggy 2 Dope. The album's title and cover art pay homage to Stanley Kubrick's 1980 psychological horror film The Shining.

The album debuted at number 48 on the Billboard 200, number 28 on the Top R&B/Hip-Hop Albums, number 14 on the Top Rap Albums and number 5 on the Independent Albums charts in the United States.

A music video for the song "Jealousy" was released on May 8, 2009. The song was later used in 2021 documentary music film The United States of Insanity.

== Production ==
Violent J states that he was not interested in developing a career as a solo performer, "but it was my turn at bat, and I wanted to deliver for any Violent J fans that might be out there". Unlike Wizard of the Hood, The Shining does not focus on a single concept or storyline, but instead focuses on multiple stories, themes, and subjects. The title of the album refers to charisma and confidence.

Violent J attempted to provide a variance for listeners by performing with different rapping styles on each track. Mike E. Clark produced the majority of the album, with Eric Davie providing additional production work. "Candyland" was developed during long late night recording sessions with Esham.

== Release ==
The album was originally intended to be released in October 2008, followed by a 20 plus date solo tour across the country. Due to his dislike of touring solo, and wanting to focus more on Insane Clown Posse as a whole, Violent J decided to give away free copies of an early version of the album to those that attended the ninth annual Gathering of the Juggalos seminar.

Due to popular demand, it was announced that Psychopathic Records would release the album nationwide, and it was also given its final title. According to Violent J, the final version of the album is significantly different from the pre-release version, and features improved sound quality, in addition to four new songs not present on the pre-release version. The album was released on Violent J's 37th birthday.

== Track listing ==
All lyrics are written by Joseph Bruce.

No.	Title	Music	Producer(s)	Length
1.	"Intro"	Violent J; Eric Davie		2:00
2.	"Wake Up"	Mike E. Clark	Mike E. Clark; Violent J	3:50
3.	"Fight Club" (featuring Esham and Necro)	Mike E. Clark	Mike E. Clark; Violent J	3:27
4.	"When I Rap"	Violent J; Eric Davie		2:05
5.	"Candy Land" (featuring Esham)	Mike E. Clark	Mike E. Clark; Violent J	4:00
6.	"Get out the Way"	Mike E. Clark	Mike E. Clark; Violent J	3:03
7.	"14 Year Old"	Mike E. Clark	Mike E. Clark; Violent J	4:02
8.	"I Get Mad"	Mike E. Clark	Mike E. Clark; Violent J	3:31
9.	"Faster"	Mike E. Clark	Mike E. Clark; Violent J	4:22
10.	"Jealousy"	Mike E. Clark	Mike E. Clark; Violent J	3:25
11.	"Home Invasion" (featuring Shaggy 2 Dope)	Mike E. Clark	Mike E. Clark; Violent J	4:02
12.	"4 the Hoes"	Violent J; Eric Davie		2:49
13.	"Pyromaniac"	Mike E. Clark	Mike E. Clark; Violent J	3:37
14.	"Let It Go"	Mike E. Clark	Mike E. Clark; Violent J	3:16
15.	"???"	Mike E. Clark	Mike E. Clark; Violent J	5:16

== Personnel ==
- Joseph "Violent J" Bruce — lyrics, vocals, producer; programming, engineering, recording & mixing (tracks: 1, 4, 12)
- Esham A. Smith — vocals (tracks: 3, 5)
- Ron "Necro" Braunstein — vocals (track 3)
- Joseph "Shaggy 2 Dope" Utsler — vocals (track 11)
- Juan Ramon "Razor Ray" Reyes — additional guitar (track 10)
- Mike E. Clark — producer; programming, engineering, recording & mixing (tracks: 2, 3, 5–11, 13–15)
- Eric Davie — programming, engineering, recording & mixing (tracks: 1, 4, 12)
- Brian Kuma — recording & mixing (tracks: 1, 4, 12)
- Brian Debler — artwork, layout
- Billy Dail — management

== Charts ==
Chart (2009)	Peak position
US Billboard 200	48
US Top R&B/Hip-Hop Albums (Billboard)	28
US Top Rap Albums (Billboard)	14
US Independent Albums (Billboard)	5
