= The United States of Insanity =

- Directed by: Tom Putnam; Brenna Sanchez
- Written by: Nicole Lucas Haimes
- Produced by: Tom Putnam; Brenna Sanchez
- Starring: Insane Clown Posse
- Cinematography: Matt Pappas
- Edited by: Tom Putnam; Sam Hook
- Production companies: TBVE; Hideout Pictures; Realization Films; Public House Films
- Distributed by: Fathom Events
- Release date: September 28, 2021 (Fantastic Fest)
- Running time: 1 hour 39 minutes
- Country: United States
- Language: English

The United States of Insanity is a documentary music film directed and produced by Tom Putnam and Brenna Sanchez. The film premiered at 2021 Fantastic Fest in Austin, Texas ahead of a theatrical release on October 26, 2021. It became available on streaming platforms on December 10, 2021.

At Film Threat's 2022 Award This! ceremony held on May 21 at the Frida Cinema, the film won in 'Music Documentary' category.

== Plot ==
The synopsis covers events held in the early 2010s, when controversial American hip hop group Insane Clown Posse fandom known as juggalos were classified as criminal gang by the Federal Bureau of Investigation and National Gang Intelligence Center due to formation of juggalo gangs. Thus led ICP along with the American Civil Liberties Union of Michigan to take on the FBI to have juggalos no longer considered to be a gang. In December 2017, the U.S. Court of Appeals for the Sixth Circuit ruled that ICP failed to demonstrate harm caused by the FBI's 2011 report.

== Cast ==
- Joseph "Violent J" Bruce as himself
- Joseph "Shaggy 2 Dope" Utsler as himself
- Mike Busey as himself
- Howard Hertz as himself
- Jeremy Killingbeck as himself
- FlipFlop The Clown as himself

== Critical response ==
The United States of Insanity received mostly positive reviews from film critics. Chuck Foster of Film Threat gave the film 9 out of 10 score, stating: "though they wear face paint throughout the entire film, they both come off as regular guys with families and kids to feed". Richard Whittaker of The Austin Chronicle wrote: "The United States of Insanity is as much a portrait of a long-ignored, mocked, and lambasted band, and the subculture that surrounds it, as it is a trip into a deeply disturbing and Kafkaesque assault on civil liberties". Christian Gallichio of The Playlist gave the film 'B+' rating, resuming: "once the film gets into the political fight -nearly the last third of the runtime – 'Insanity' takes on a beautifully surreal quality".
