= Mostasteless =

Studio album by Twiztid
- Released: August 4, 1998
- Recorded: 1997
- Genres: Horrorcore; gangsta rap
- Length: 52:47
- Label: Psychopathic

Twiztid chronology
Mostasteless (1998)	Freek Show (2000)

Mostasteless is the debut album by American hip hop duo Twiztid, released on August 4, 1998, by Psychopathic Records. The album was reissued in 1999 with distribution by Island Records; this reissue has a drastically altered track listing, with tracks added and removed.

== Conception ==
=== Background ===
Jamie Spaniolo (Mr. Bones) and Paul Methric (Hektic), along with The R.O.C., formed the rap trio House of Krazees in 1992. The group released five albums before disbanding in 1997. After the split, Methric and Spaniolo sent a demo tape to Insane Clown Posse member Violent J. The demo contained the tracks "2nd Hand Smoke," "Diemuthafuckadie," and "How Does It Feel?" Bruce was extremely impressed, invited Methric and Spaniolo to perform on 'The House of Horrors Tour', and signed them to Psychopathic Records. Before the tour kicked off, Bruce, Methric, and Spaniolo decided on a name that they felt would fit the duo—"Twiztid".

=== Music ===
Mostasteless is a horrorcore and gangsta rap album which incorporates elements of other genres, including 1970s soul music, thrash metal and "street jams". "Diemuthafuckadie!" samples the song "Spooky Boogie" by the progressive rock band Gentle Giant. "2nd Hand Smoke" samples the chorus from En Vogue's "Free Your Mind". "85 Bucks An Hour" samples "It Takes Two" by Rob Base and DJ E-Z Rock.

=== Recording ===
"Murder, Murder, Murder" was recorded with the intention of being included on another House of Krazees album, but the group broke up before the album was completed, and The R.O.C.'s verse was deleted from the Mostasteless release of the song. "Somebody's Dissin' U" was also written prior to the duo's naming, as they referred to themselves as their old personas Mr. Bones and Hektic. Most of the lyrics in "Renditions of Reality" had previously appeared on the House of Krazees track "Slip Into Reality". Most of the other songs were written especially for the album, except for "First Day Out", which is a cover of the Insane Clown Posse song which appeared on their 1992 debut Carnival of Carnage.

Twiztid recorded with guest appearances by Insane Clown Posse on "Meat Cleaver" and "85 Bucks An Hour", and Myzery on "Meat Cleaver". ICP's producer Mike E. Clark and Scott Sumner produced the album. Joseph Utsler has a non-rap spoken interlude on "She Ain't Afraid". Joseph Bruce provided additional vocals on other songs. On the reissue, ICP is featured on "Spin the Bottle" and along with Blaze Ya Dead Homie on "Hound Dogs". The beat for "Hound Dogs" was originally created for a Myzery track, but his project got scrapped. Judging by the five artists' appearance and various lyrics that specifically mentions Dark Lotus, "Hound Dogs" could be considered a Dark Lotus track. "Renditions of Reality" contains a hidden track which reveals a hotline number.

== Release ==
The alternate covers of Mostasteless. An alternate cover depicted a two-headed fetus (left), while the national release version contained comic book-styled artwork (right).

Mostasteless was initially released on August 4, 1998, by Psychopathic Records; while alternate cover artwork depicted a two-headed fetus, the main cover artwork depicted the faces of Spaniolo and Methric. Psychopathic had not had success with attempting to release albums by artists other than Insane Clown Posse, but Mostasteless was well received by ICP's Juggalo fanbase. While on tour with ICP, Twiztid learned that Psychopathic would pull Mostasteless from stores, and that it would be reissued by Island Records.

The Island reissue reorganized the track listing, deleting a hidden track at the end of "Renditions of Reality", Violent J laughing at the end of "1st Day Out", and sampled dialogue from the film Halloween III: Season of the Witch at the beginning of "Whatthefuck!?!?". The removed songs were "Murder, Murder, Murder", "Somebody's Dissin' U", "Meat Cleaver", "She Ain't Afraid", "Smoke Break", and "Anotha Smoke Break". The added songs were "Rock the Dead", "Spin the Bottle", "Blink", "Bury Me Alive", and "Hound Dogs". Additionally, some of the lyrics in "Diemuthafuckadie" and "Whatthefuck!?!?" are censored on the Island reissue. This version was released on June 22, 1999, and peaked at #8 on the Billboard Heatseekers chart and #149 on the Billboard 200.

== Reception ==
Professional ratings
Review scores
Source	Rating
Allmusic	2/5 stars
Exclaim!	(favorable)

In his review of the reissued album, Allmusic's Stephen Thomas Erlewine wrote that "[Although] the thought of a group of Insane Clown Posse protégés isn't exactly inspiring", the album "may take you by surprise...Mostasteless actually works better than most ICP records," that "Twiztid often is more convincing than [its] Dark Carnival colleagues," and concluded that "if you don't buy into the whole comic book-horror shtick, Mostasteless...will be irritating, but if you've bought into it, you'll enjoy this record as much, if not more, than most ICP albums." Exclaim! reviewer Thomas Quinlan called it "a good fun album that ranks among the best ICP releases."

== Legacy ==
Following the Island reissue, rare tracks from the original version of Mostasteless appeared on the compilations Psychopathics from Outer Space, Cryptic Collection and Cryptic Collection Vol. 2. "Whathefuck!?!?", "Somebody's Dissin' U" and "Renditions of Reality" were remixed on Cryptic Collection. In 2008, DJ Clay released a remix of "Diemuthafuckadie!" on Let 'Em Bleed: The Mixxtape, Vol. 1, with a newly recorded verse by R.O.C. "Hound Dogs", which appeared on the Island reissue, was included on Insane Clown Posse's compilation Featuring Freshness in 2011. The beat of "Murder, Murder, Murder" was reused in Cold 187um's song "An Offer He Can't Refuse" from his 2012 album, The Only Solution.

In mid June 2017 it was announced that Twiztid will take part in a 20th Anniversary Mostasteless Tour, performing the album in its entirety. It was also announced that Blaze Ya Dead Homie will be performing the Blaze Ya Dead Homie EP in its entirety. The lineup for the tour was Twiztid, Moonshine Bandits, Blaze Ya Dead Homie, Whitney Peyton, and Andrew W. Boss.

On Mostasteless, the track "How Does It Feel?" abruptly ends during Madrox's verse. Although the reasoning was unknown, the track was visited again on Twiztid's 2017 album The Continuous Evilution of Life's ?s, as the song is continued at the end of the track "That's Why They All Hate Us More Than You'll Ever Know".

== Track listing ==
Original version
No.	Title	Producer(s)	Length
1.	"Twiztid"	Mike E. Clark	0:46
2.	"2nd-Hand Smoke"	Twiztid & Scott Sumner	4:32
3.	"Diemuthafuckadie"	Twiztid & Scott Sumner	4:02
4.	"Smoke Break"		0:36
5.	"Murder, Murder, Murder"	R.O.C.	3:16
6.	"1st Day Out - '98"	Mike E. Clark	4:21
7.	"Somebody Dissin' U"	Twiztid & Scott Sumner	3:33
8.	"Meat Cleaver" (featuring Insane Clown Posse and Myzery)	Mike E. Clark	4:25
9.	"How Does It Feel?"	Scott Sumner	3:43
10.	"She Ain't Afraid"	Twiztid & Scott Sumner	6:01
11.	"Whatthefuck!?!?"	Twiztid & Scott Sumner	4:32
12.	"Anotha Smoke Break"		0:37
13.	"85 Bucks an Hour" (featuring Insane Clown Posse)	Mike E. Clark	3:17
14.	"Renditions of Reality / ???" (Renditions of Reality ends at 5:19. Hidden track "???" plays at 7:10)	Twiztid & Scott Sumner	9:39
Total length:			52:47

National release version
No.	Title	Producer(s)	Length
1.	"Twiztid"	Mike E. Clark	0:47
2.	"2nd Hand Smoke"	Twiztid & Scott Sumner	4:30
3.	"Diemuthafuckadie"	Twiztid & Scott Sumner	4:02
4.	"Rock the Dead"	Mike E. Clark	4:52
5.	"Spin the Bottle" (featuring Insane Clown Posse)	Mike E. Clark	4:13
6.	"Blink"	Mike E. Clark	4:25
7.	"How Does It Feel?"	Scott Sumner	3:44
8.	"85 Bucks an Hour" (featuring Insane Clown Posse)	Mike E. Clark	3:15
9.	"1st Day Out"	Mike E. Clark	4:18
10.	"Whatthefuck!?!?"	Twiztid & Scott Sumner	3:44
11.	"Bury Me Alive"	Mike E. Clark	4:08
12.	"Hound Dogs" (performed by Dark Lotus)	Mike E. Clark	6:03
13.	"Renditions of Reality"	Twiztid & Scott Sumner	5:19
Total length:			53:26

== Charts ==
Chart (1997)	Peak Position
Billboard 200	149
