= Battery Records (dance) =

- Parent company: Jive Records
- Founded: 1994; 31 years ago
- Defunct: 1996; 29 years ago
- Status: Defunct
- Distributors: BMG; Sony Music Entertainment (currently)
- Genre: Dance, hip hop
- Country of origin: United States
- Location: New York City

Battery Records was an American record label that served as the dance sublabel of Jive Records, and was active for a short time during the mid-1990s. The label was mostly known for releasing music by the Swedish Eurodance group Rednex in North America, namely its novelty hit "Cotton Eye Joe", as well as Insane Clown Posse's third studio album, Riddle Box. The Battery Records name was later revived by Sony Music Entertainment in 2008 with a focus on hip hop music.

== History ==
Battery was formed when Zomba's Dutch office signed Rednex and created a number-one hit with "Cotton Eye Joe." Newly appointed Jive president Barry Weiss was attempting to broaden the pop-music reach of the label group, and introducing Rednex to American listeners was one of his first steps. Suddenly Jive needed a suitable American outlet for this unique style and didn't feel that any current sub-labels were appropriate. Thus, Battery record's inaugural release was the "Cotton Eye Joe" American import in 1994. Although the song was successful, reaching #25 on the Billboard charts, it remained the group's only US hit.

While the New York City-based label largely focused on pop-oriented electronic music, it also released Insane Clown Posse's third album, Riddle Box. The label continued for a few more years signing at least one more artist before closing its doors in 1996.

== Releases ==
Cat. No.	Artist	Title	Format	Type	Release date
01241-46000	Rednex	Sex & Violins	CD	Album	1995
01241-46001	Insane Clown Posse	Riddle Box	CD	Album	1995
01241-46500	Rednex	"Cotton Eye Joe"	CD, 12"	Single	1994
01241-46501	Rednex	"Cotton Eye Joe"	7"	Single	1994
01241-46504	Insane Clown Posse	"Chicken Huntin'"	CD	Single	1995
01241-46506	Tamperer featuring Maya	"Feel It"	CD	Single	1998

== See also ==
- List of record labels
- Sony Music Entertainment
