= Ringmaster (album) =

Studio album by Insane Clown Posse
- Released: March 8, 1994
- Recorded: 1993
- Studios: 313 Studios (Detroit, MI)
- Genres: Horrorcore, gangsta rap
- Length: 70:04
- Label: Psychopathic
- Producers: Insane Clown Posse; Mike E. Clark

Insane Clown Posse chronology
Carnival of Carnage (1992)	Ringmaster (1994)	Riddle Box (1995)

Singles from Ringmaster
- 1. "Murder Go Round" Released: 1994; 2. "Chicken Huntin'" Released: 1995

Ringmaster is the second studio album by the American hip-hop duo Insane Clown Posse, and their second Joker Card in the first Deck of the Dark Carnival mythology. It was originally released on March 8, 1994, via Psychopathic Records and was reissued in 1998 through Island Records. Recording sessions took place at 313 Studio in Detroit. Production was handled by Mike E. Clark and ICP themselves. It features guest appearances from Capitol E and Jumpsteady. The album's lyrics describe the leader of the Carnival, who serves as one of the judges of one's soul in the afterlife, as being created from the listener's own evils. The album's instrumentals feature several samples from French psychedelic rock band Gong.

The album was certified Gold by the Recording Industry Association of America on June 7, 2004, for selling 500,000 units in the United States.

Its promotional single, "Chicken Huntin'" was remixed and featured on the duo's third studio album, Riddle Box, which was released the following year. Another remix of the song appeared on the soundtrack album to Reginald Hudlin's 1996 film The Great White Hype.

An accompanying "sideshow" EP The Terror Wheel was released on August 5, 1994. The EP contains six studio tracks. "The Dead Body Man" which was subsequently re-released in 1995 on Insane Clown Posse's third studio album Riddle Box, in a slightly higher key. "The Dead Body Man" received significant local radio play in Detroit following the release of The Terror Wheel. "The Smog" was also intended to be released on Riddle Box. The final track on the album contained a number you could call to find out the name of the next Joker's Card, Riddle Box.

== Conception ==
=== Background ===
Following a dream by group member Violent J in which "spirits in a traveling carnival appeared to him", Insane Clown Posse created the mythology of the Dark Carnival. The Carnival, a metaphoric limbo in which the lives of the dead await to be judged, was planned to be elaborated through a series of stories called Joker's Cards, each of which offers a specific lesson designed to change the "evil ways" of listeners before "the end consumes us all."

Following the release of the first Joker's Card, Carnival of Carnage, the group began to build a local following. To increase interest and popularity, they produced a mass amount of promotional material such as demo packages, flyers, and fan club newsletters. The group also released their first EP, Beverly Kills 50187, in 1993. When they felt the building anticipation for the second Joker's Card, the duo began work on Ringmaster.

=== Joker's Cards ===
Ringmaster is the second Joker's Card in Insane Clown Posse's Dark Carnival concept album series. The Dark Carnival is a concept of the afterlife in which souls are sent to a form of limbo while waiting to be sent to heaven or hell based on their individual actions. These concepts are related by Insane Clown Posse in a series of albums called the six Joker's Cards. Each of the six Joker's Cards relate to a specific character—an entity of the Dark Carnival—that tries to "save the human soul" by showing the wicked inside of one's self.

Ringmaster is the overseer of the Carnival of Carnage. He is created through one's own sins, and is one of several who will judge whether a soul is worthy to enter heaven or doomed to eternal hell. The Card issues a warning against the neglect of our basic morals.

== Music ==
=== Samples ===
- "Chicken Huntin'" samples "May You Never Be Alone" by Hank Williams and "Pungee" by The Meters
- "Southwest Song" samples "Right on for the Darkness" by Curtis Mayfield
- "Get Off Me, Dog!" samples "Trigga Happy" by Spice 1 and "C & H Sugar" by Hampton Hawes
- "Who Asked You" samples "Oily Way" and "Flute Salad" by Gong and "Nobody's Fault" by Aerosmith
- "The Dead One" samples "Selene", "Flute Salad", and "Castles in the Clouds" by Gong
- "My Fun House" samples "Bullet in the Head" by Rage Against the Machine and "Shelter" by Circuit
- "For The Maggots" samples "Bambooji" and "You Can't Kill Me" by Gong
- "The Loons" samples "The Stalker" by Insane Clown Posse and "Poo Too" by Oneness of Juju
- "Ringmaster's Word" samples "The Pot Head Pixies" by Gong

=== Lyricism ===
When writing lyrics for the album, the group realized that they were defining the direction for future Joker's Cards and what their group could become. Joseph Bruce explains that they "wanted to make a statement, to direct our energy. We wanted to mix comedy and horror, and hold it up like a mirror to a city full of gangsters and scrubs like us". According to the group's mythology, the Ringmaster is the leader of the Carnival of Carnage. He leads "the phantoms of the dead" that take the form of the Carnival. The creatures fiercely tear doomed souls from their living bodies and drag them down into Hell. The album tells morality tales as the Ringmaster character takes the listener through exhibits of the Carnival, as in such songs as "Murder Go Round", "Wagon Wagon", and "House of Mirrors".

== Release and promotion ==
To help promote the album, Insane Clown Posse created the comic book Wicked Clownz featuring themselves and the Ringmaster character. The comic was written by Violent J, illustrated by 2 Dope, and printed in Canada. The cover of the comic was illustrated by Justin Felix. Seven weeks before the release of the album, the pressing company produced 10,000 CDs and 10,000 cassettes that were filled with misprints. Psychopathic manager Alex Abbiss threatened to sue to pressing company, and the company doubled the groups order for free to make up for the mistake, and presented the group with a total of 40,000 units.

In 1994, Insane Clown Posse opened a concert for Too $hort in Monroe, Michigan. Too $hort was "blown away by what he saw", and told Jeff Fenster at Jive Records about Insane Clown Posse. Fenster attended the 1994 annual Hallowicked concert in Detroit, and signed Insane Clown Posse to the short-lived Jive Records subsidiary label Battery Records, which funded the production of a music video for the song "Chicken Huntin'". Violent J and Jumpsteady developed their own concept for the video, but the director changed their plans, and the final concept instead featured Insane Clown Posse performing actions which Violent J later described as "[Some of] the stupidest thing[s] I had ever heard of". Because the group and the label were disappointed with the video, it was not publicly released at the time. However, a snippet of it later appeared on Stranglemania in 1996; finally, the full video was released on Psychopathic: The Videos in 2007.

== Critical reception ==
Professional ratings
Review scores
Source	Rating
AllMusic	3/5 stars
The Great Rock Discography	4/10 stars
The New Rolling Stone Album Guide	1/5 stars
RapReviews	5.5/10

In his 2004 edition of The Great Rock Discography series, music historian Martin C. Strong gave the album four out of ten stars. The album received one star out of five in The New Rolling Stone Album Guide. AllMusic's Stephen Thomas Erlewine wrote that Ringmaster has "more focus on [the] Ringmaster [character], which means that the album hits harder and makes a bigger impression". Steve 'Flash' Juon of RapReviews stated: "they had improved substantially from their amateur Inner City Posse days, and Ringmaster was the first album to actually give name to the Dark Carnival and make it the block their entire Juggalo empire was built on. Clark's production doesn't exceed the norms of the day but it also doesn't drag the Posse backward into obscurity. It builds on what they did with Carnival of Carnage and Beverly Kills 50187 but doesn’t exceed the standard they set. There's a minuscule amount of improvement here, but any step forward is a positive". Walker MacMurdo of Willamette Week described the album as "a fusion of disparate influences that works for about half of its 70 minutes".

== Legacy ==
Ringmaster's popularity enabled Insane Clown Posse to sell out larger nightclubs across their hometown of Detroit, Michigan, such as St. Andrews Hall and the State Theatre. Because members Violent J and Shaggy 2 Dope made reference to the Detroit-produced soft drink Faygo in their songs, they "figured it would be cool to have some on stage with [them]." During a concert in 1993, Bruce threw an open bottle of Faygo at a row of concertgoers who were giving them the finger. After receiving a positive response, J and 2 Dope since continued to spray Faygo onto audiences. A subsequent national tour increased sales of the album, earning Ringmaster a gold certification.

Jive Records produced a remix of the song "Chicken Huntin'" which was rejected by Insane Clown Posse, leading the group to produce its own remix, which appeared on their next album Riddle Box. The song "Mr. Johnson's Head" was re-recorded in 1997 and was intended to be featured on the group's fourth studio album The Great Milenko. The idea was later scrapped due to their label at the time, Hollywood Records, rejecting the track for its violent lyrics, as they would with several of the group's other songs. The re-recording was released on Insane Clown Posse's compilation album Forgotten Freshness Volumes 1 & 2, along with the 20th Anniversary reissue. Later that year, the duo signed with Island/PolyGram, which reissued Ringmaster in 1998.

== Track listing ==
All tracks are written by Joseph Bruce and Joseph Utsler, except for "House of Mirrors" written with Erik Perry.

Side One: Heckles
No.	Title	Producer	Length
1.	"Wax Museum"	Mike E. Clark	5:12
2.	"Murder Go-Round"	Mike E. Clark	5:38
3.	"Chicken Huntin'"	Mike E. Clark	4:08
4.	"Mr. Johnson's Head"	Mike E. Clark	6:10
5.	"Southwest Song"	Mike E. Clark	5:45
6.	"Get Off Me, Dog!"	Mike E. Clark	1:47
7.	"Who Asked You"	Bruce and Utsler	3:00
8.	"The Dead One"	Mike E. Clark	4:34
Total length:			36:14

Side Two: Macabre
No.	Title	Producer	Length
9.	"My Fun House" (featuring Jumpsteady)	Bruce and Utsler	4:58
10.	"For the Maggots"	Mike E. Clark	1:46
11.	"Wagon Wagon"	Bruce and Utsler	3:55
12.	"The Loons"	Bruce and Utsler	5:28
13.	"Love Song"	Bruce and Utsler	4:18
14.	"Bugz on My Nugz"	Bruce and Utsler	4:29
15.	"House of Mirrors" (featuring Capitol E)	Bruce and Utsler	6:06
16.	"Ringmaster's Word"	Bruce and Utsler	2:51
Total length:			33:51

== Personnel ==
- Joseph "Violent J" Bruce – vocals (tracks: 2–5, 7–15), producer, mixing (tracks: 3, 6–13, 15), engineering (tracks: 7, 9, 11–16)
- Joseph "Shaggy 2 Dope" Utsler – vocals (tracks: 3, 5, 6, 9, 10, 14, 15), scratches (tracks: 1, 2, 4, 5, 7, 11–14), producer, mixing (tracks: 3, 6–13, 15), engineering (tracks: 7, 9, 11–16)
- Robert "Jumpsteady" Bruce – vocals (track 9)
- Erik "Capitol E" Perry – vocals and producer (track 15)
- Mike E. Clark – producer and engineering (tracks: 1–6, 8–15)
- Laura Grabb – programming and engineering (track 7)
- Lori Molnar – photography

== Certifications ==
Region	Certification	Certified units/sales
United States (RIAA)	Gold	500,000^{^}
^{^} Shipments figures based on certification alone.
