= F.T.F.O. =

Studio album by Shaggy 2 Dope
- Released: February 21, 2006
- Recorded: 2003–05
- Studios: The Lotus Pod (Detroit, MI); The Funhouse Studio (Sterling Heights, MI)
- Genre: Rap rock
- Length: 56:53
- Labels: Psychopatic; PSY 4056
- Producers: Insane Clown Posse; Mike E. Clark; Polar Bear; Fritz The Cat (add.)

Shaggy 2 Dope chronology
F.T.F.O. (2006)	F.T.F.O.M.F. (2017)

Professional ratings
Review scores
Source	Rating
411Mania	7.5/10
AllMusic	3.5/5 stars
RapReviews	7/10

F.T.F.O. (an acronym for Fuck The Fuck Off) is the debut solo studio album by American rapper Shaggy 2 Dope. It was released on February 21, 2006 via Psychopathic Records. Recording sessions took place at the Lotus Pod in Detroit and at the Funhouse Studio in Sterling Heights, Michigan. Production was handled by Insane Clown Posse, Mike E. Clark, Polar Bear and Fritz the Cat. It features guest appearance from Twiztid. The album art alludes to the ICP tradition of spraying the audience (and themselves) with the American soft drink Faygo.

The album debuted at No. 88 on the Billboard 200, No. 24 on the Top Rock Albums, No. 7 on the Independent Albums and No. 11 on the Tastemakers with nearly 14,000 copies sold in its first week in the United States.

== Track listing ==
No.	Title	Producer(s)	Length
1.	"Prelude"	Insane Clown Posse	1:18
2.	"Fuck the Fuck Off"	Shaggy 2 Dope	3:20
3.	"Keep It Scrubbin'"	Polar Bear	3:29
4.	"Forever & Always"	Mike E. Clark	3:24
5.	"Make It Happen"	Shaggy 2 Dope; Fritz the Cat (add.)	3:10
6.	"Memories"	Mike E. Clark	3:21
7.	"Meltdown"	Violent J	3:26
8.	"They Shootin'"	Polar Bear	3:07
9.	"Half Full"	Mike E. Clark	3:15
10.	"Always Fuckin' with Us" (featuring Twiztid)	Mike E. Clark	3:52
11.	"Pull Me Over"	Mike E. Clark	3:42
12.	"Ball Bounce"	Shaggy 2 Dope	3:58
13.	"Red Moon"	Violent J	3:24
14.	"Owl Face Hoe"	Shaggy 2 Dope; Fritz the Cat (add.)	3:20
15.	"Cobwebs in the Attic"	Mike E. Clark	3:22
16.	"It's About Time"	Shaggy 2 Dope	2:58
17.	"Your Life"	Mike E. Clark	4:27
Total length:			56:53

== Personnel ==
- Joseph "Shaggy 2 Dope" Utsler – lyrics, lead vocals, producer (tracks: 1, 2, 5, 12, 14, 16)
- Paul "Monoxide" Methric – lyrics & vocals (track 10)
- James "Jamie Madrox" Spaniolo – lyrics & vocals (track 10)
- Joseph "Violent J" Bruce – lyrics (tracks: 1, 2, 4, 6, 7, 8, 9, 11, 13, 17), additional vocals (tracks: 2, 4, 7, 8, 9, 11, 13, 15, 17), producer (tracks: 1, 7, 13)
- James "Lavel" Hicks – additional vocals (tracks: 3, 7, 13), engineering (tracks: 1, 3, 4, 6–8, 12–17)
- Chris "Blaze Ya Dead Homie" Rouleau – additional vocals (tracks: 4, 10)
- Michelle "Sugar Slam" Rapp – additional vocals (track 13)
- James "Anybody Killa" Lowery – additional vocals (track 14)
- Annette Utsler – additional vocals (track 14)
- Mike E. Clark – producer (tracks: 4, 6, 9, 10, 11, 15), engineering (track 10), mixing
- Polar Bear – producer (tracks: 3, 8)
- Fritz "The Cat" Vankosky – additional producer (tracks: 5, 14), engineering (tracks: 2, 5, 9, 10, 11)
- Brian Debler – graphics
- Michael Scotta – graphics

== Charts ==
Chart (2006)	Peak position
US Billboard 200	88
US Top Rock Albums (Billboard)	24
US Independent Albums (Billboard)	7
US Indie Store Album Sales (Billboard)	11
