= Riddle Box =

Studio album by Insane Clown Posse
- Released: October 10, 1995
- Studios: The Fun House; The Disc Ltd.; Pulsar Sound Studios; Cynder Block Studios
- Genre: Horrorcore
- Length: 70:33
- Labels: Psychopathic; Battery
- Producers: Insane Clown Posse; Mike E. Clark

Insane Clown Posse chronology
Ringmaster (1994)	Riddle Box (1995)	The Great Milenko (1997)

Riddle Box is the third studio album by the American hip hop duo Insane Clown Posse, released in 1995 on Battery Records and Island Records in association with Psychopathic Records. It is the third Joker's Card in the group's Dark Carnival mythology. It was also released a second time by Battery Records and Jive Records.

The album was the first Insane Clown Posse album in which the group worked with studio vocalist and guitarist Rich Murrell, who would work with the group throughout much of their career under the name Legz Diamond. It was released in four different versions, and earned a gold certification by the Recording Industry Association of America (RIAA). In 2008, Riddle Box was re-released on vinyl double LP format. In 2015, Psychopathic Records reissued the album in a 20th anniversary edition, featuring bonus tracks.

Unsatisfied with their contract with Jive Records, Insane Clown Posse's manager, Alex Abbiss, set up a deal which would sign the group with Hollywood Records. During the two days between their Jive contract expiring and being signed to Hollywood Records, ICP recorded and independently released an EP on Psychopathic Records. The EP, titled Tunnel of Love, was released June 11, 1996.

== Conception ==
=== Background ===
In 1995, Insane Clown Posse signed a contract with the short-lived Jive Records subsidiary label Battery Records. Anticipating the album to be their first national release, the duo began work on Riddle Box. Member Joseph Bruce recalled thinking that working on the album would be "all the records we had done … rolled into one single effort."

=== Recording ===
Recording for Riddle Box occurred in producer Mike E. Clark’s personal studio. The group was looking to make the album more theatrical, so Clark introduced them to local guitarist and vocalist Rich Murrell. Originally a member of the group Coup Detroit, Murrell later left his band to join Insane Clown Posse’s studio band along with Clark. Murrell contributed to the album through guitar and various vocals in songs and skits.

Jive Records' Senior Vice President of Artists and repertoire, Jeff Fenster, had told Insane Clown Posse that Riddle Box couldn’t be over one hour long. When the group turned in the album at 70 minutes and 40 seconds long, Fenster was furious. Joseph Bruce told Fenster that the album featured several skits, and convinced him that the length was not an issue.

=== Joker's Cards ===
Riddle Box is the third Joker's Card in Insane Clown Posse's Dark Carnival concept album series. The Dark Carnival is a concept of the afterlife in which souls are sent to a form of limbo while waiting to be sent to heaven or hell based on their individual actions. These concepts are related by Insane Clown Posse in a series of albums called the six Joker's Cards. Each of the six Joker's Cards relate to a specific character — an entity of the Dark Carnival — that tries to "save the human soul" by showing the wicked inside of one's self.

Riddle Box is one of several entities used to determine the fate of the dead. Upon death, a soul enters a dark chamber containing a jack-in-the-box on an old wooden table. The front of the box has a "painted question mark faded with time," representing the mystery of your own afterlife. As the handle is turned, a melodic tune begins to play, and when the music stops, the choice is made. The pure see a vision of God, warming their souls as they enter eternal peace. The wicked see an immense fog seeping from the box, "stripping their sanity, as they witness an image of hell, spawned and formed from their own evil; a hideous reflection of their demented souls." The floor falls from underneath them, casting the doomed into the bottomless pit of Hell.

== Music ==
"Chicken Huntin'", which was remixed for Riddle Box, was previously released on Insane Clown Posse's 1994 album Ringmaster. "Dead Body Man" was previously released in 1994, on the group's second EP The Terror Wheel, in a lower key. "3 Rings" was previously released on Shaggy 2 Dope's 1994 EP Fuck Off!, with the Riddle Box version featuring a change in lyrics.

=== Samples ===
"I'm Coming Home" contains a sample from "Confetti Day" by Hot Chocolate. "Cemetery Girl" contains a sample from the Carnival of Carnage song "Guts on the Ceiling". "Toy Box" samples Gong's "The Pot Head Pixies" and the Pee-wee's Playhouse theme song.

=== Lyricism ===
The eponymous Riddle Box is a jack-in-the-box that decides whether one's soul is sent to Shangri-La or Hell's Pit in the afterlife. The album's themes revolve around death and judgement, and reveal that the fate determined by the Riddle Box can be found by looking deep within yourself, and can be changed with righteous actions. In "Chicken Huntin'," the group raps about killing multiple racist rednecks, referred to as 'Chickens'. The song "3 Rings" speaks against social excommunication. "Joker's Wild" is a gameshow in Hell where a police officer, a judge, and a redneck are all sentenced to be tortured. The song "12" tells of a misplaced execution in which the person killed takes vengeance on 12 jurors who were involved in sentencing him to death. The second to last song on the album, "The Killing Fields," tells of a part of Hell where the wicked are perpetually tortured.

The album also makes several references to American popular culture. The title of the song "The Joker's Wild" is inspired by the quiz show of the same name. "Ol' Evil Eye" is loosely based around Edgar Allan Poe's famous short story "The Tell-Tale Heart" and features excerpts from the story being read. Poe was given credit for the track's lyrics.

== Release and promotion ==
Riddle Box was released in four different versions. One version was the standard pressing, a second contained a bonus track of snippets from four Hed PE songs, a third featured reversed colors on the disc, and a fourth was a remastered version. Battery/Jive Records showed little interest in promoting the album, and only released it limitedly nationwide. Insane Clown Posse then funded its own promotion of Riddle Box independently in Dallas, Texas, where it persuaded several music retail stores to stock the album. Sales averaged 1,500 copies per week as a result.

== Critical reception ==
Professional ratings
Review scores
Source	Rating
AllMusic	3/5 stars
The Rolling Stone Album Guide	1.5/5 stars

Jason Anderson from AllMusic stated that "Perhaps ICP's more dynamic delivery and second-rate Cypress Hill aesthetic elevates Riddle Box just above its predecessors, but all of the group's musical work is so far below any reasonable rap/rock standard that it hardly matters." and picked "Chicken Huntin' (Slaughter House Mix)", "The Joker's Wild" and "Ol' Evil Eye" the best tracks of the album.

== Legacy ==
A music video for "Chicken Huntin' (Slaughter House Mix)" was shot at the State Theatre (now called the Fillmore Theatre) during an Insane Clown Posse concert. The director of the video, Paris Mayhew, wanted Insane Clown Posse to perform the song several times in order to get the footage from all angles, but the duo refused to repeat the song because it was an actual ICP concert, and not just a video shoot. The video was shot with ICP performing the song only once. The original version of "Chicken Huntin'" was performed for the video shoot, because their fans were not yet familiar with the remix. This made Jive furious, but there were no editing problems, and Violent J later referred to the video as "our freshest video ever."

Songs called "Fat Sweaty Betty" and "Willy Bubba" were originally intended for this album. Insane Clown Posse even released a single of "Fat Sweaty Betty". They were cut from the album at the last minute, but remixed versions were later released on Forgotten Freshness and Forgotten Freshness 1 & 2. In 2002, the track "Riddle Box" was featured in the film Solaris. According to Insane Clown Posse, the group has not received any financial compensation from the filmmakers. On December 16, 2008, Riddle Box was re-released on vinyl double LP format.

This album was responsible for expanding the Juggalo fanbase into its own culture. In turn this lead Insane Clown Posse to write the songs "What Is A Juggalo?" and "Down With The Clown" for their next album, The Great Milenko.

== Track listing ==
No.	Title	Writer(s)	Length
1.	"Intro"		1:23
2.	"Riddle Box"	Joseph Bruce; Joseph Utsler; Mike E. Clark	2:51
3.	"The Show Must Go On"	Bruce; Utsler; Clark	5:07
4.	"Chicken Huntin'" (Slaughter House Mix)	Bruce; Utsler; Dave Greenberg; Howard Dodd; Marc Niles; Clark	3:42
5.	"Interview" (Skit)		0:47
6.	"Toy Box"	Bruce; Utsler; Clark	5:24
7.	"Cemetery Girl"	Bruce; Utsler; Clark	5:08
8.	"3 Rings"	Bruce; Utsler; Clark	4:50
9.	"Headless Boogie"	Bruce; Utsler; Clark	4:22
10.	"The Joker's Wild"	Bruce; Utsler; Clark	4:56
11.	"Dead Body Man"	Bruce; Utsler; Clark	4:20
12.	"Lil' Somthin' Somthin'"	Bruce; Utsler; Clark	5:28
13.	"Ol' Evil Eye"	Bruce; Utsler; Clark; Edgar Allan Poe	4:53
14.	"12"	Bruce; Utsler; Clark	6:35
15.	"The Killing Fields"	Bruce; Utsler; Rich Murrell; Clark	4:55
16.	"I'm Coming Home"	Bruce; Utsler; Clark; Errol Brown	5:52
Total length:			70:33

Sample credits

- Track 16 contains a sample from "Confetti Day" written by Errol Brown as recorded by Hot Chocolate.

20th anniversary bonus disc: Riddle Box Oddities
No.	Title	Length
1.	"The Riddle Box Show Intro"	2:17
2.	"I Didn't Mean to Kill ’Em"	3:54
3.	"Riddle Box Sampler Part Two"	0:26
4.	"Lil' Somethin' Somethin'" (instrumental)	4:56
5.	"Ink Town Posse"	1:06
6.	"Ol' Evil Eye" (instrumental)	5:32
7.	"Riddle Box Sampler Ending"	0:20
8.	"Mike E. Clark Calls Violent J"	1:18
9.	"3 Rings" (early mix)	4:39
10.	"Toy Box" (show version)	4:27
11.	"Joker's Gallery EP Intro"	3:50
12.	"Willy Bubba" (alternate version)	3:36
13.	"Hotline Message"	0:57
14.	"The Killing Fields" (instrumental)	4:30
15.	"Fabulous"	2:00
16.	"Fat Sweaty Betty" (Celluloid Bubble remix)	4:52
17.	"Riddle Box Sampler Part 4 & 12" (instrumental)	7:50

== Personnel ==
- Violent J – vocals
- Shaggy 2 Dope – vocals, turntables
- Mike E. Clark – turntables, production
- Rich "Legz Diamond" Murrell – skit vocals, guitar

== Charts ==
Chart (1995)	Peak position
US Heatseekers Albums (Billboard)	16

== Certifications ==
Region	Certification	Certified units/sales
United States (RIAA)	Gold	500,000^{^}
^{^} Shipments figures based on certification alone.
