= The Great Milenko =

Studio album by Insane Clown Posse
- Released: June 24, 1997 (Hollywood recalled pressings); August 12, 1997 (Island reissue)
- Recorded: 1996–1997
- Studios: A&M Studios (Hollywood); The Fun House (Ferndale, Michigan)
- Genres: Horrorcore; rap metal
- Length: 67:39
- Labels: Hollywood; Island
- Producers: Mike E. Clark; ICP

Insane Clown Posse chronology
Riddle Box (1995)	The Great Milenko (1997)	The Amazing Jeckel Brothers (1999)

Singles from The Great Milenko
- 1. "Halls of Illusions" Released: 1997; 2. "How Many Times?" Released: 1998; 3. "Hokus Pokus (Headhunta'z Mix)" Released: 1998; 4. "Piggy Pie" Released: 1998

The Great Milenko is the fourth studio album by American hip-hop group Insane Clown Posse, released on June 24, 1997, by Hollywood Records in association with Psychopathic Records. As the fourth Joker's Card in the group's Dark Carnival mythology, the album's lyrics focus on the titular Great Milenko, who is a necromancer.

The album was recorded and initially released by the Disney-owned record label Hollywood Records. The album was taken off shelves by Hollywood hours after its release, in response to criticism from the Southern Baptist Church of decisions that the church believed did not reflect Disney's family-friendly image, although Disney claimed that the album was released due to an oversight by its review board. After Hollywood terminated the group's contract, Insane Clown Posse signed a new contract with Island Records (whose parent at the time, PolyGram, distributed Hollywood releases in North America), which agreed to release the album as it was originally intended. Island then re-released the album on August 12, 1997.

The music of The Great Milenko features a rap metal sound and features guest appearances by popular rock stars Alice Cooper, Steve Jones and Slash. Although the album was poorly received by critics, it debuted at number 63 on the Billboard charts, and was later certified two-times platinum by the Recording Industry Association of America (RIAA).

== Conception ==
=== Background ===
Following the 1994 release of the album Ringmaster, Insane Clown Posse started to attract a strong local following in Detroit, Michigan. The group began selling out large clubs such as St. Andrew's Hall and the State Theatre, and drew the attention of major record label Jive Records. The following year, Insane Clown Posse signed with the label Battery Records, a subsidiary of Jive Records. Battery/Jive released the duo's third studio album, Riddle Box (1995), but showed little interest in promoting the album. The group's manager, Alex Abbiss, negotiated a contract with Disney's Hollywood Records label, which reportedly paid $1 million to purchase the Insane Clown Posse contract from Battery/Jive Records.

The expansion of the Juggalo fanbase into its own culture inspired Insane Clown Posse to write the songs "What Is a Juggalo?" and "Down with the Clown" for this album.

=== Recording ===
The group started recording The Great Milenko in June 1996, and Violent J began thinking of a title for the album shortly after. Bruce later came up with the title The Great Milenko. Bruce also admitted that he had always liked the ring name of professional wrestler Dean Simon ("Dean Malenko"), because he felt that the name Malenko had a "carnival" sound to it. Believing that he had created the name himself, Bruce later realized that he had unwittingly used the nickname of Dean's father, Boris "The Great" Malenko.

The band wanted to include famous rock stars on the album. Julian Raymond, the artists and repertoire representative for Hollywood Records, contacted Slash, Steve Jones, and Alice Cooper. Slash, who was a self-professed fan of the band's music, reportedly only asked for Wild Irish Rose as payment for his contributions. Bruce, who knew very little about the Sex Pistols or Steve Jones, declined to show up at the studio when Jones played his guitar part for "Piggy Pie". Although not knowing much about Alice Cooper either, Bruce decided to fly to Arizona and coach Cooper on his parts. Bruce and Clark also met George Clinton, who was staying in the same hotel, and recorded his voice in his room, but it did not fit anywhere on the album.

After the recording sessions were finished, executives at Hollywood Records—and the label's parent company, Disney—expressed dissatisfaction with several tracks. Disney requested that the tracks "The Neden Game", "Under the Moon", and "Boogie Woogie Wu" be removed because of lyrics referencing abuse of women, rape and murder, and the slaughter of children, respectively. Disney also asked that the lyrics of "Piggy Pie" be changed, due to lyrics about murdering police officers. Disney threatened not to release the album if their requests were not met. Begrudgingly, Bruce and Utsler complied with Disney's requests. The uncensored version of "Piggy Pie" was later released on Forgotten Freshness Volumes 1 & 2. Another song, titled "House of Wonders", which had also been recorded for the album, was later released on Mutilation Mix (1997) and Forgotten Freshness Volumes 1 & 2 (1998).

=== Joker's Cards ===
The Great Milenko is the fourth Joker's Card in Insane Clown Posse's Dark Carnival concept album series. The Dark Carnival is a concept of the afterlife in which souls are sent to a form of limbo while waiting to be sent to heaven or hell based on their individual actions. These concepts are related by Insane Clown Posse in a series of albums called the six Joker's Cards. Each of the six Joker's Cards relate to a specific character—an entity of the Dark Carnival—that tries to "save the human soul" by showing the wickedness inside of one's self.

This Joker's Card is a necromancer and illusionist who tries to trick individuals into acts of greed, envy, and lust. The Card ultimately issues a warning against such acts of sin, and enlightens listeners that The Great Milenko is a part of every individual, and that they have the power to fall under his illusions or cast his hoaxes aside.

== Music ==
=== Style ===
"Boogie Woogie Wu" (sample)
"Boogie Woogie Wu", from the group's 1997 album The Great Milenko.

The Great Milenko featured more rock influences than previous Insane Clown Posse albums, including an introduction performed by Alice Cooper and guitar tracks performed by Steve Jones (on "Piggy Pie"), and Slash (on "Halls of Illusions"). Stephen Thomas Erlewine of AllMusic wrote, in his review of The Amazing Jeckel Brothers (1999) that, "The Great Milenko [...] was targeted at white-boy, adolescent metalheads -- really, how could any album that contained guest spots from Alice Cooper, Slash, Steve Jones and Legs Diamond be anything else?"

Insane Clown Posse hired renowned Detroit record producer and DJ Mike E. Clark to produce the record. Clark made the album sound more rock-oriented, as opposed to the duo's earlier material, which featured a more prominent hip-hop sound. To create the record, Clark utilized standard hip-hop techniques such as record scratching, and mixed them with elements of rock and heavy metal.

=== Lyricism ===
From deep within the Nethervoids of shadow walkers comes yet another exhibit of the Dark Carnival. He is the master of the art of using magic without magic. He is a Necromaster – the craft of using magic through the dead. Dead meaning both physically and mentally. This spectacle shall be witnessed only by those who are meant to see it. Look deep inside of your soul and ask yourself... Together you and he are the Great Milenko.

— Liner notes

According to the group's mythology, The Great Milenko is a necromancer and illusionist who tries to trick individuals into greed and other such sins. He takes out the worst in an individual and creates powerful illusions in an attempt to cause them to become hedonistic and greedy. An honorable individual must fight his magic in order to make it to Shangri-La (as revealed in the track "Pass Me By").

The album's themes mostly revolve around those of death, morality, and everyday decisions. For instance, "How Many Times?" talks about annoying traffic jams and other everyday-life inconveniences. "Piggy Pie" references the Three Little Pigs and tells Violent J's story of murdering three kinds of people: an incest-prone redneck, a judge who unjustly sentences people based on their looks, and a stuck-up wealthy person. "Under the Moon" tells the tale of a man convicted after killing a man who tried to rape his girlfriend. "Boogie Woogie Wu" is told from the perspective of the boogie man and talks about the slaughter of children. The "Neden Game" takes the form of a Dating Game-esque show, albeit with added misogynistic banter for humor. Finally, the lyrics to "Hellalujah" target money-hungry preachers.

=== Singles ===
Two singles were released from the album: "Halls of Illusions" and "Hokus Pokus". "Halls of Illusions" was the first single released in 1997. The single peaked at number 56 on the UK Singles Chart, and its accompanying music video peaked at number one on The Box video request channel. The album's second single, "Hokus Pokus", was released in June 1997. In 1998, it peaked at number 54 on the UK Singles Chart.

== Promotion and release ==
"We spent all that time recording the album, and it was out for half a day, then yanked out of stores. Our tour was cancelled, our in-store tour was cancelled, everything we had was cancelled."

— Violent J

To promote the album, the Insane Clown Posse scheduled a national tour, with House of Krazees and Myzery as opening acts. Hollywood Records also shipped 100,000 copies of The Great Milenko to various record stores prior to its release date. However, during a music-store autograph signing, Insane Clown Posse was notified that Hollywood Records had deleted the album within hours of its release, despite it having already sold 18,000 copies (enough for it to reach number 63 on the Billboard 200). The group was also informed that its in-store signings and 25-city nationwide tour had been canceled, commercials for the album and the music video for "Halls of Illusions" (which had reached number one on The Box video request channel) were pulled from television, and that the group had been dropped from the label. It was later revealed that Disney was being criticized by the Southern Baptist Church at the time because of Disney's promotion of Gay Days at Disneyland, in addition to producing and distributing the gay-themed television sitcom Ellen. The church claimed Disney was turning its back on family values. Although Abbiss told the press that Disney had stopped production of The Great Milenko to avoid further controversy, Disney claimed instead that the release of the album was an oversight by their review board, and that the album "did not fit the Disney image" because of its "inappropriate" lyrics, which they claimed were offensive to women. Although Hollywood Records had ordered record stores to return shipments of the now-deleted album, many record stores refused, including the Michigan-based Harmony House where 1,700 CDs were sold in 36 stores after the termination order.

After the termination of the Hollywood Records contract, labels such as Interscope and Geffen Records wanted to sign the group, but Island Records' Chris Blackwell came to the group's rescue and agreed to release The Great Milenko as it was originally intended. As part of the deal, Island also agreed to re-release the group's first two Joker's Card albums. Milenko was eventually released in four colored variants: red, green, purple, and gold. Each color had a different secret message that would help reveal the title of the fifth Joker's Card, The Amazing Jeckel Brothers. Music videos were filmed for "Halls of Illusions", "How Many Times?", and "Piggy Pie". An unofficial music video for "Down with the Clown" was featured on the home-video release Juggalo Championshxt Wrestling Volume 1. A music video for the Headhuntaz Remix of "Hokus Pokus" was produced after the release of the album. The video featured appearances by Twiztid and Myzery. Blackwell left Island Records shortly after the group released Forgotten Freshness Volumes 1 & 2, and the merger of PolyGram into Universal Music Group (which owned Interscope and Geffen) affected the way the label handled its next Joker's Card release. Despite the rough start, The Great Milenko has sold well over the years. On May 5, 1998, the album was certified gold by the Recording Industry Association of America (RIAA). A year later, on April 21, 1999, the album was certified platinum for shipments of over one million copies. On March 18, 2026, the album was certified double-platinum for shipments of over two million copies. As of 2007, the album has sold over 1.7 million copies in the United States.

== Critical reception ==
Professional ratings
Review scores
Source	Rating
AllMusic	3/5 stars
Entertainment Weekly	C−
The Great Rock Discography	5/10
Kerrang!	3/5 stars
The Rolling Stone Album Guide	2/5 stars
Spin	3/10

Entertainment Weekly music critic David Browne gave the record a C-minus rating: "[With] its puerile humor and intentionally ugly metal-rap tunes, the album feels oddly dated." AllMusic reviewer Stephen Thomas Erlewine said that The Great Milenko is "the sort of record you wish they would take off the stereo at excruciating frat parties." In The Great Rock Discography, Martin Charles Strong gave the album five out of ten stars. The album received two out of five stars in The New Rolling Stone Album Guide, in which Ben Sisario identified it as the album in which "the group came into its own".

Although the reviews were mostly negative, some critics complimented the album's improved sound over its precursors. Stephen Thomas Erlewine said that the album was "a better record than [its] predecessors, boasting a tougher sound and some actual hooks, without losing the juvenile vulgarity that pleased their following", and added that "it is better than the rest of ICP's work". David Browne said that "Milenko is better produced than the duo's earlier output (Slash grinds out metal chords on Halls of Illusions), and Pass Me By is a genuinely melodic song." In 2009, Fangoria named The Great Milenko an iconic horrorcore album.

== Track listing ==
All tracks are written by Mike E. Clark and Insane Clown Posse.

No.	Title	Performer(s)	Length
1.	"Intro"	ICP, Alice Cooper, Deb Agoli	2:00
2.	"Great Milenko"	ICP	1:57
3.	"Hokus Pokus"	ICP, Deb Agoli, Kim Marro	4:22
4.	"Piggy Pie"	ICP, Steve Jones, Legz Diamond	5:47
5.	"How Many Times?"	ICP, Legz Diamond	6:21
6.	"Southwest Voodoo"	ICP	4:03
7.	"Halls of Illusions"	ICP, Slash, Legz Diamond	4:21
8.	"Under the Moon"	ICP	5:00
9.	"What Is a Juggalo?"	ICP	3:58
10.	"House of Horrors"	ICP, Deb Agoli, Legz Diamond	4:21
11.	"Boogie Woogie Wu"	ICP	4:25
12.	"Neden Game"	ICP	4:06
13.	"Hellalujah"	ICP, Legz Diamond	4:58
14.	"Down with the Clown"	ICP, Legz Diamond	3:53
15.	"Just Like That"	ICP	1:25
16.	"Pass Me By"	ICP, Legz Diamond	6:42
Total length:			67:39

20th anniversary edition bonus disc
No.	Title	Performer(s)	Length
1.	"Black Blizzard" (featuring Cheap Trick)		3:39
2.	"Hokus Pokus" (Headhunta'z Mix)		3:54
3.	"What Is a Juggalo?" (alternate mix)		4:50
4.	"Piggy Pie" (Old School)	ICP, Steve Jones, Legz Diamond	4:24
5.	"Mr. Johnson's Head" (remix)	ICP, Legz Diamond	6:07
6.	"$85 Bucks an Hour" (Twiztid featuring ICP)		3:15
7.	"Boogie Woogie Wu/The Neden Game Mashup"		6:32
8.	"Mental Warp"		4:28
9.	"Rare Milenko Phone Skit"	ICP, Legz Diamond	0:56
10.	"Confessions"	ICP, Legz Diamond	3:59
11.	"House of Wonders"	ICP, Legz Diamond	3:06
12.	"Witching Hour" (Myzery featuring ICP)		5:31
13.	"Hellalujah" (early mix)		3:59
14.	"Pumpkin Carver" (featuring Kottonmouth Kings and Twiztid)		4:39
15.	"Gone"		7:12
16.	"Down with the Clown" (alternate mix)		4:41

== Personnel ==
Members

- Violent J – vocals
- Shaggy 2 Dope – vocals, artwork

Production

- Mike E. Clark – production, programmer, engineer
- John Srebalus – assistant engineer
- John Polito – album edited and sequenced
- Brian Gardner – mastered
- Ed Colver – photography
- Gary Arnett – design & layout
- Julian Raymond – artists and repertoire

Other personnel

- Rich "Legz Diamond" Murrell – guitar on "Piggy Pie" "How Many Times?" "Halls of Illusions" "House of Horrors" "Hellalujah" & "Pass Me By" vocals on "House of Horrors" "Hellalujah" "Down With the Clown" & "Pass Me By"
- Alice Cooper – vocals on "Intro"
- Kim Marro – vocals on "Hokus Pokus"
- Steve Jones – guitar on "Piggy Pie"
- Slash – guitar on "Halls of Illusions"
- Deb Agoli – vocals on "Intro" "Hokus Pokus" & "House of Horrors"

== Charts and certifications ==
=== Weekly charts ===
Chart (1997–1999)	Peak position
US Billboard 200	63
US Top Catalog Albums (Billboard)	22

=== Year-end charts ===
Chart (1998)	Position
US Billboard 200	177

=== Certifications ===
Region	Certification	Certified units/sales
United States (RIAA)	2× Platinum	2,000,000^{‡}
^{‡} Sales+streaming figures based on certification alone.

=== Singles ===
Year	Song	Peak positions
Year	Song	UK
1997	"Halls of Illusions"	56
1998	"Hokus Pokus"	53
