= Mike E. Clark =

American DJ and record producer

- Born: Michael Earl Clark; December 25, 1962 (age 63)
- Origin: Michigan, U.S.
- Genres: Hip-hop
- Occupations: Record producer, disc jockey
- Years active: 1987–present
- Website: mikeclark.com

Michael Earl Clark (born December 25, 1962) is an American record producer and DJ from Michigan, best known for working with Insane Clown Posse, Kid Rock, Prozak and Mickey Avalon. Clark has also worked with George Clinton, Patti Smith and R.L. Burnside.

== Biography ==
Clark was born on December 25, 1962, and raised in Roseville, Michigan, He took an early interest in music and the first album Clark received was a greatest hits compilation by Sonny & Cher as a Valentine's Day gift from his mother. Clark later discovered Warren Zevon, Elton John, The Rolling Stones, Sex Pistols and The Stooges. After graduating from high school, Clark took classes on music production at the Recording Institute in Eastpointe, Michigan, and soon got a job at The Disc Ltd.

Clark worked as an assistant engineer on Patti Smith's "Wild Leaves", the B-side of the single "People Have the Power", which appeared on Smith's 1988 album Dream of Life. During this period, Clark met Kid Rock, and helped produce demos that led to Jive Records signing the aspiring rapper. Clark's talent for producing hip-hop earned him the nickname "The Funky Honky". In 1989, he helped engineer (and played keyboard on) the debut album of Esham.

For Kid Rock's debut album, Grits Sandwiches for Breakfast, Clark produced the single "Yo-Da-Lin In The Valley". During the recording of Insane Clown Posse's Carnival of Carnage, the group's manager, Alex Abbiss, hired Clark to produce the album, which featured appearances from Esham and Kid Rock. Clark continued to work with the group and various associated acts on its label, Psychopathic Records. Clark has been involved with the production of albums by George Clinton, R. L. Burnside, and Primal Scream.

In 2000, Clark began working on Dark Lotus' debut album, Tales from the Lotus Pod, and Insane Clown Posse's sixth and seventh albums, Bizzar and Bizaar, but had a falling-out with members Violent J and Shaggy 2 Dope. According to Clark, "It seemed like too much was going on, and I wasn't sure about the material. I needed a break. I was frazzled, we weren't getting along, so that was it." Clark produced four songs for Tales from the Lotus Pod; the album's production was completed by Twiztid producer Fritz the Cat.

In 2001 Clark then started his own record label B4 Records producing records for local acts Dead By 28 and Abstrakt Intellekt. Unfortunately these bands proved to be unprofitable.

Clark and rapper Prozak formed the group Project: Deadman, releasing its debut album, Self Inflicted, in 2004, and touring the United States for six months. That year, Clark became a full-time engineer for Kid Rock. Clark contracted pneumonia, but ignored the illness, and began coughing severely as he awoke, leading to a three-month stay in Mount Clemens General Hospital, during which one of his lungs collapsed three times.

As the result of his near-death experience, Clark decided to reconcile with J and Shaggy. Phone conversations between Clark and Insane Clown Posse led to Clark producing Utsler's 2006 solo album F.T.F.O. In 2007, Clark produced the Kid Rock single "All Summer Long", which was musically based upon a mash-up of Warren Zevon's "Werewolves of London" and Lynyrd Skynyrd's "Sweet Home Alabama". The same year, Clark produced Insane Clown Posse's tenth album The Tempest, but did not work with the group directly.

In 2009, Clark produced the group's eleventh studio album, Bang! Pow! Boom!, the first album that Clark worked on directly with J and Shaggy since Bizzar and Bizaar. Three years later, Clark produced the group's twelfth studio album The Mighty Death Pop!, as well as the bonus albums Smothered, Covered & Chunked, Freaky Tales, & Mike E. Clark's Extra Pop Emporium.

== Music and production style ==
Mike E. Clark is known for providing an eclectic musical approach in his hip-hop production. In Barry Walters' Rolling Stone review of The Amazing Jeckel Brothers, Walters wrote that Clark's production incorporates elements of "carnival organ riffs, power chords and shotgun blasts ... banjolike plucking and Van Halen-esque guitar squeals." Allrovi writer David Jeffries called Clark's production style a fusion of electro, funk and "Oingo Boingo-like mad-clown melodies", comparing Clark to George Clinton and Danny Elfman.

Clark has cited numerous influences on his music, including punk and heavy metal artists such as Rob Zombie, Black Sabbath, The Cramps, The Clash, Fugazi, and System of a Down, funk musicians Rick James, Prince, James Brown and Parliament-Funkadelic, blues, jazz and R&B musicians like Serge Gainsbourg, Al Green, Billie Holiday, Curtis Mayfield, Buddy Miles, Bessie Smith and Howlin' Wolf, alternative musicians like Beck, Faith No More, Hüsker Dü, Pixies and Ween, progressive rock artists Pink Floyd and Frank Zappa, and hip hop artists such as Beastie Boys, De La Soul, Public Enemy, Busta Rhymes, Geto Boys, Grandmaster Flash and N.W.A, as well as artists David Bowie, Bob Dylan, Madonna, Bob Marley, Klaus Nomi, War, Yoko Ono and Warren Zevon, and producers Rick Rubin and Phil Spector.
