= Gathering of the Juggalos 2006 =

2006 music festival organized by Psychopathic Records

- Date: July 13–16, 2006
- Venue: Frontier Ranch
- Locations: Pataskala, Ohio, United States
- Previous event: 2005
- Next event: 2007
- Organizer: Psychopathic Records
- Website: juggalogathering.com

The 2006 Gathering of the Juggalos (also known as The Gathering or GOTJ) was a music festival organized by Psychopathic Records, a record label owned by the Detroit-based horrorcore hip-hop duo, the Insane Clown Posse. The festival took place from July 13 to July 16, 2006 at the Frontier Ranch in Pataskala, Ohio.

== Background ==
The Gathering of the Juggalos was created in 1999 when Rob Bruce, also known by his stagename "Jumpsteady", organized an event for all Juggalos, a concept long talked about by Insane Clown Posse. The first Gathering took place in Novi, Michigan at the Novi Expo Center on July 21–22, 2000, with roughly 2,000 fans in attendance. The festival featured concert performances, autograph sessions, seminars, wrestling hosted by Juggalo Championshxt Wrestling (JCW), tattooing, a haunted house, video games, contests, an ICP memorabilia museum and more. The second Gathering took place from July 13–15, 2001 at the Seagate Convention Centre in Toledo, Ohio. The event was controversially ended when the Toledo Police Department cut the Insane Clown Posse's concert at the festival short on July 15, 2001 which resulted in a riot.

During the 2002 Gathering of the Juggalos, a riot had broken out between 1,000 attendees and police that was caused by officers arresting a woman in the exhibit hall for baring her breasts. Tear gas, rubber bullets, and pepper spray were released into the crowd, however, representatives from Psychopathic Records were able to negotiate with the police and the festival continued 30 minutes after the riot started.

During the 2004 Gathering, the hip-hop group Bone Thugs-n-Harmony held a surprise reunion concert on the opening night.

During the 2005 Gathering, the Axe Murder Boyz won the Underground Psychos contest in which attendees could vote on who would win with the winner of the contest would be given a contract with Psychopathic Records. The group signed to the label in 2006 following a brief tour with the Insane Clown Posse. After 2005 Gathering concluded, Nelson Ledges Quarry Park's owner, Evan Kelley, kicked the festival out of the venue, claiming that "Psychopathic Records broke some of the rules set down for the 2005 event, including blasting music all night long." He also explained that "Drugs, alcohol, nudity, profanity, and trash also became serious problems."

In April 2006, Psychopathic Records announced that the 2006 Gathering of the Juggalos would take place at the Michigan International Speedway in Brooklyn, Michigan. However, the board of Woodstock Township, Michigan denied the label the permits needed to hold the event. On April 18, Psychopathic Records announced that the Gathering would be held in Pataskala, Ohio at the Frontier Ranch from July 13–16, 2006.

== Performer lineup ==
The lineup for the 2006 Gathering of the Juggalos consisted of more than 100 musicians and music groups including Psychopathic Records-signed artists Twiztid, Zug Izland, Blaze Ya Dead Homie, Jumpsteady, Anybody Killa, Axe Murder Boyz, and Esham, Mount Westmore member Too $hort, horrorcore rap-rock band Wolfpac, nu metal band Drowning Pool, Oakland, California-based hip-hop group Digital Underground, industrial rock band Intricate Unit, Miami-based hip-hop group 2 Live Crew, punk jazz band Mower, death metal band Vile, metal band Dead by Wednesday and the supergroups Psychopathic Rydas and Dark Lotus. The festival was headlined by the Insane Clown Posse. The festival also featured stand-up comedy from comedians Johnny Lampert, Joe Matarese, Brad Trackman, Jimmy Shubert, Jason Andors, and Joe Derosa.

=== Main stage ===
Thursday (July 13)	Friday (July 14)	Saturday (July 15)	Sunday (July 16)
Dark Lotus	Filthee Immigrants; Wolfpac; Too $hort; Blaze Ya Dead Homie	Project Deadman; Rehab; Tommy Lee; Twiztid	Axe Murder Boyz; Digital Underground; Drowning Pool; Insane Clown Posse

=== Bomb House ===
Thursday (July 13)	Friday (July 14)	Saturday (July 15)
Ruthless; V-Sinzter; Pot Luck; Psychopathic Rydas	Mantis; Church of Hate; Motown Rage; Drouch Fhoula	Psycho Jesus; Playaz Lounge Crew; King Gordy; 2 Live Crew

=== Seminar Stage ===
Thursday (July 13)	Friday (July 14)	Saturday (July 15)
Johnny Lampert; Joe Matarese	Brad Trackman; Jimmy Shubert	Jason Andors; Joe Derosa

== Professional wrestling production ==
Gathering of the Juggalos
- Promotion: Juggalo Championshxt Wrestling
- Date: July 14–15, 2006
- City: Pataskala, Ohio
- Venue: Frontier Ranch

Juggalo Championshxt Wrestling event chronology
← Previous; JCW vs. TNA	Next → Hallowicked After-Party

Gathering of the Juggalos chronology
← Previous; 2005 (JCW vs. TNA)	Next → 2007

=== Storylines ===
JCW's Gathering of the Juggalos events featured professional wrestling matches that involves different wrestlers from pre-existing scripted feuds and storylines. Wrestlers portrayed villains, heroes, or less distinguishable characters in scripted events that built tension and culminated in a wrestling match or series of matches. Storylines were produced on Juggalo Championshxt Wrestling's various events.

== Professional wrestling results ==
Day 1 - July 13, 2006
No.	Results	Stipulations
1	Dyson Price defeated The DBA	Singles match
2	Norman Smiley and Shark Boy defeated Breyer Wellington and CJ Otis	Tag team match
3	Big Chuck Wagon defeated Nate Webb	Singles match
4	The Headshrinkers (Alofa and Samu) defeated 2 Tuff Tony and Corporal Robinson, Bump 'n' Uglies (Bubba MacKenzie and Josh Movado), and The Powers of Pain (The Barbarian and The Warlord)	Four corners tag team match
5	Kevin Sullivan vs. The Rude Boy ended in a no contest	Hardcore match
6	Mad Man Pondo and The Headhunters (Headhunter A and Headhunter B) defeated Nosawa, Vampiro, and Violent J	Six-man tag team match

Day 2 - July 15, 2006
No.	Results	Stipulations
1	Shark Boy defeated The DBA	Singles match
2	The Midnight Express (Bobby Eaton and Dennis Condrey) defeated The Bump 'n' Uglies (Bubba MacKenzie and Josh Movado)	Hardcore match
3	Dyson Price defeated Breyer Wellington	Singles match
4	Scott Steiner defeated Norman Smiley	Singles match
5	Ron Killings defeated CJ Otis	Singles match
6	2 Tuff Tony and Corporal Robinson defeated The Headshrinkers (Alofa and Samu)	Tag team match
7	Abyss defeated Mad Man Pondo	Singles match
8	Kevin Sullivan and the Rude Boy defeated The Headhunters (Headhunter A and Headhunter B)	Tag team match
9	Nosawa, Vampiro, and Violent J defeated Mad Man Pondo and The Powers of Pain (The Barbarian and The Warlord)	Six-man tag team match
