= Gathering of the Juggalos 2005 =

2005 music festival organized by Psychopathic Records

- Promotional poster
- Date: July 21–24, 2005
- Venue: Nelson Ledges Quarry Park
- Locations: Garrettsville, Ohio, United States
- Previous event: 2004
- Next event: 2006
- Organizer: Psychopathic Records
- Website: juggalogathering.com

The 2005 Gathering of the Juggalos (also known as The Gathering or GOTJ) was a music festival organized by Psychopathic Records, a record label owned by the Detroit-based horrorcore hip-hop duo, the Insane Clown Posse. The festival took place from July 21 to July 24, 2005 at Nelson Ledges Quarry Park (also referred to as Crystal Forest) in Garrettsville, Ohio.

== Background ==
The Gathering of the Juggalos was created in 1999 when Rob Bruce, also known by his stagename "Jumpsteady", organized an event for all Juggalos, a concept long talked about by Insane Clown Posse. The first Gathering took place in Novi, Michigan at the Novi Expo Center on July 21–22, 2000, with roughly 2,000 fans in attendance. The festival featured concert performances, autograph sessions, seminars, wrestling hosted by Juggalo Championshxt Wrestling (JCW), tattooing, a haunted house, video games, contests, an ICP memorabilia museum and more. The second Gathering took place from July 13–15, 2001 at the Seagate Convention Centre in Toledo, Ohio. The event was controversially ended when the Toledo Police Department cut the Insane Clown Posse's concert at the festival short on July 15, 2001 which resulted in a riot.

During the 2002 Gathering of the Juggalos, a riot had broken out between 1,000 attendees and police that was caused by officers arresting a woman in the exhibit hall for baring her breasts. Tear gas, rubber bullets, and pepper spray were released into the crowd, however, representatitives from Psychopathic Records were able to negotiate with the police and the festival continued 30 minutes after the riot started.

During the 2004 Gathering, the hip-hop group Bone Thugs-n-Harmony held a surprise reunion concert on the opening night.

== Performer lineup ==
The lineup for the 2005 Gathering of the Juggalos consisted of several notable names including Psychopathic Records-signed artists Twiztid, Zug Izland, Blaze Ya Dead Homie, Jumpsteady, Anybody Killa, and Esham, rap-rock band Kottonmouth Kings, horrorcore rap-rock band Wolfpac, US DMC champion DJ Swamp, stand-up comedian Charlie Murphy, Strange Music co-owner Tech N9ne, Grammy Award-winning rappers Vanilla Ice and Kurupt, Hoo-Bangin' Records CEO Mack 10, metalcore band Manntis, Boston Music Award-winning rock band Powerman 5000, Denver-based hip-hop group Axe Murder Boyz, Miami-based hip-hop group 2 Live Crew, Kiss tribute band Mini Kiss, and the supergroup Dark Lotus. The festival was headlined by the Insane Clown Posse.

=== Main Stage ===
Thursday (July 15)	Friday (July 16)	Saturday (July 17)	Sunday (July 18)
Dark Lotus	Mini Kiss; Jumpsteady; Manntis; Esham; Anybody Killa; Axe Murder Boyz; Playaz Lounge Crew	2 Live Crew; Blaze Ya Dead Homie; Powerman 5000; Twiztid; Charlie Murphy	Tech N9ne; Mack 10; Insane Clown Posse

== JCW vs. TNA ==
JCW vs. TNA
- Promotion(s): Juggalo Championshxt Wrestling; Total Nonstop Action Wrestling
- Date: July 22–24, 2005
- City: Garrettsville, Ohio
- Venue: Nelson Ledges Quarry Park

Gathering of the Juggalos chronology
← Previous; 2004	Next → 2006

=== Production ===
==== Storylines ====
JCW vs. TNA featured professional wrestling matches that involves different wrestlers from pre-existing scripted feuds and storylines. Wrestlers portrayed villains, heroes, or less distinguishable characters in scripted events that built tension and culminated in a wrestling match or series of matches. Storylines were produced on Juggalo Championshxt Wrestling and Total Nonstop Action Wrestling's various events.

=== Results ===
Day 1 - July 22, 2005
No.	Results	Stipulations
1	2 Tuff Tony defeated Kid Kash (c) and Lenny Lane	Three way match for the JCW Heavyweight Championship
2	Chuck Wagon vs. The Too Tall Ninja ended in a no contest	Singles match
3	Corporal Robinson defeated Mr. Insanity	Hardcore match
4	Abyss defeated Rhino	Singles match
5	America's Most Wanted (Chris Harris and James Storm) defeated Mad Man Pondo and Sabu	Tag team match
6	Ron Killings vs. Samu ended in a no contest	Singles match
7	D-Ray 3000 and Petey Williams vs. The Insane Clown Posse (Shaggy 2 Dope and Violent J) ended in a no contest	Tag team match
(c) / – the champion(s) heading into the match

Day 2 - July 23, 2005
No.	Results	Stipulations
1	Lenny Lane defeated The Blue Meanie	Singles match
2	Mr. Insanity defeated JC Bailey	Hardcore match
3	Chuck Wagon vs. The Too Tall Ninja ended in a no contest	Singles match
4	Rhino defeated D-Ray 3000	Singles match
5	Ron Killings defeated CJ Otis	Singles match
6	America's Most Wanted (Chris Harris and James Storm) defeated 2 Tuff Tony and Corporal Robinson	Tag team match
7	Abyss defeated Mad Man Pondo	Singles match
8	Terry Funk defeated 2 Tuff Tony, A-1, Abyss, Chris Harris, Corporal Robinson, D-Ray 3000, James Storm, Jeff Jarrett, Kid Kash, Mad Man Pondo, Petey Williams, Rhino, Samu, Shaggy 2 Dope, The Blue Meanie, Violent J	Battle royal for the vacant JCW Heavyweight Championship

Day 3 - July 24, 2005
No.	Results	Stipulations
1	Lenny Lane defeated D-Ray 3000	Singles match
2	Chuck Wagon vs. The Too Tall Ninja ended in a no contest	Singles match
3	Homeless Jimmy defeated Mr. Insanity	Hardcore match
4	2 Tuff Tony and Corporal Robinson defeated Team Canada (A1 and Petey Williams)	Tag team match
5	Ron Killings and Samu defeated CJ Otis and JC Bailey	Tag team match
6	Rhino defeated Abyss	Singles match
7	Kid Kash defeated Nosawa (c)	Singles match for the JCW Heavyweight Championship
8	Jeff Jarrett defeated Sabu	Singles match
9	Mad Man Pondo defeated Terry Funk (c)	Singles match for the JCW Heavyweight Championship
10	The Insane Clown Posse (Shaggy 2 Dope and Violent J) defeated America's Most Wanted (Chris Harris and James Storm)	Tag team match
(c) / – the champion(s) heading into the match

== Aftermath ==
During the festival, the Axe Murder Boyz won the Underground Psychos contest in which attendees could vote on who would win with the winner of the contest would be given a contract with Psychopathic Records. The group signed to the label in 2006 following a brief tour with the Insane Clown Posse.

After the festival concluded, Nelson Ledges Quarry Park's owner, Evan Kelley, kicked the festival off his grounds. He claimed that "Psychopathic Records broke some of the rules set down for the 2005 event, including blasting music all night long." He also explained that "Drugs, alcohol, nudity, profanity, and trash also became serious problems."
