= Gathering of the Juggalos 2004 =

2004 music festival organized by Psychopathic Records

- Promotional poster
- Date: July 15–18, 2004
- Venue: Nelson Ledges Quarry Park
- Locations: Garrettsville, Ohio, United States
- Previous event: 2003
- Next event: 2005
- Attendance: 5,000
- Organizer: Psychopathic Records
- Website: juggalogathering.com

The 2004 Gathering of the Juggalos (also known as The Gathering or GOTJ) was a music festival organized by Psychopathic Records, a record label owned by the Detroit-based horrorcore hip-hop duo, the Insane Clown Posse. The festival took place from July 15 to July 18, 2004 at Nelson Ledges Quarry Park (also referred to as Crystal Forest) in Garrettsville, Ohio.

== Background ==
The Gathering of the Juggalos was created in 1999 when Rob Bruce, also known by his stagename "Jumpsteady", organized an event for all Juggalos, a concept long talked about by Insane Clown Posse. The first Gathering took place in Novi, Michigan at the Novi Expo Center on July 21–22, 2000, with roughly 2,000 fans in attendance. The festival featured concert performances, autograph sessions, seminars, wrestling hosted by Juggalo Championshxt Wrestling (JCW), tattooing, a haunted house, video games, contests, an ICP memorabilia museum and more. The second Gathering took place from July 13–15, 2001 at the Seagate Convention Centre in Toledo, Ohio. The event was controversially ended when the Toledo Police Department cut the Insane Clown Posse's concert at the festival short on July 15, 2001 which resulted in a riot.

During the 2002 Gathering of the Juggalos, a riot had broken out between 1,000 attendees and police that was caused by officers arresting a woman in the exhibit hall for baring her breasts. Tear gas, rubber bullets, and pepper spray were released into the crowd, however, representatitives from Psychopathic Records were able to negotiate with the police and the festival continued 30 minutes after the riot started.

The 2003 Gathering was held at Nelson Ledges Quarry Park in Garrettsville, Ohio, marking the first time that the festival was held at an outdoor venue.

== Performer lineup ==
The lineup for the 2004 Gathering of the Juggalos consisted of several notable names including Psychopathic Records-signed artists Twiztid, Zug Izland, Blaze Ya Dead Homie, Jumpsteady, Anybody Killa, and Esham, rap-rock band Kottonmouth Kings, horrorcore rap-rock band Wolfpac, US DMC champion DJ Swamp, Strange Music co-owner Tech N9ne, Grammy Award-winning rappers Vanilla Ice and Kurupt, multi-time Grammy Award-winning rap rock group Bone Thugs-N-Harmony who reunited after a several month hiatus, Wu-Tang Clan co-founder Ol Dirty Bastard, and the supergroups Dark Lotus and Psychopathic Rydas. The festival was headlined by the Insane Clown Posse.

=== Main stage ===
Thursday (July 15)	Friday (July 16)	Saturday (July 17)	Sunday (July 18)
Bone Thugs-N-Harmony	Wolfpac; Jumpsteady; Anybody Killa; Dark Lotus; DJ Swamp	Zug Izland; Esham; Kurupt; Blaze Ya Dead Homie	Tech N9ne; Vanilla Ice; Ol Dirty Bastard; Psychopathic Rydas; Insane Clown Posse

== Professional wrestling production ==
Gathering of the Juggalos
- Promotion: Juggalo Championshxt Wrestling
- Date: July 16–17, 2004
- City: Garrettsville, Ohio
- Venue: Nelson Ledges Quarry Park

Gathering of the Juggalos chronology
← Previous; 2003	Next → 2005 (JCW vs. TNA)

=== Storylines ===
JCW's Gathering of the Juggalos events featured professional wrestling matches that involves different wrestlers from pre-existing scripted feuds and storylines. Wrestlers portrayed villains, heroes, or less distinguishable characters in scripted events that built tension and culminated in a wrestling match or series of matches. Storylines were produced on Juggalo Championshxt Wrestling's various events.

== Professional wrestling results ==
Day 1 - July 16, 2004
No.	Matches*	Stipulations
1	Lenny Lane defeated Zach Gowen	Singles match
2	Ian Rotten defeated Mr. Insanity	Singles match
3	Sabu defeated Breyer Wellington	Singles match
4	2 Tuff Tony and Corporal Robinson defeated Mad Man Pondo and Necro Butcher	Tag team match
5	Nosawa (c) defeated Chuck Hogan	Singles match for the JCW Heavyweight Championship
6	Kid Kash & Monty Brown vs. The Insane Clown Posse (Shaggy 2 Dope & Violent J)	Tag team match
(c) / – the champion(s) heading into the match; *Card subject to change

Day 2 - July 17, 2004
No.	Results	Stipulations
1	Chuck Hogan defeated Truth Martini	Singles match
2	2 Tuff Tony and Corporal Robinson defeated Mr. Insanity and Necro Butcher	Tag team match
3	Zach Gowen defeated Breyer Wellington	Singles match
4	Mad Man Pondo defeated Ian Rotten	Hardcore match
5	Dusty Rhodes defeated The Rude Boy	Singles match
6	Sabu defeated Lenny Lane	Singles match
7	The Insane Clown Posse (Shaggy 2 Dope and Violent J) and Terry Funk defeated Jerry Lawler, Kid Kash, and Monty Brown	Six man tag team match

Day 3 - July 18, 2004
No.	Results	Stipulations
1	The Dirty Grandmas (Agony and Cosby) defeated The Fat Boys (Simon Ice and The Wild Thing)	Tag team match
2	Breyer Wellington defeated Truth Martini	Singles match
3	2 Tuff Tony and Corporal Robinson defeated Ian Rotten and Mr. Insanity	Hardcore tag team match
4	Trinity defeated Lenny Lane and Sumie Sakai	Three way match
5	Zach Gowen defeated Jerry Lawler	Singles match
6	The Rude Boy defeated Dusty Rhodes and Terry Funk	Three way match
7	Kid Kash defeated Nosawa (c)	Singles match for the JCW Heavyweight Championship
8	Sabu and The Insane Clown Posse (Shaggy 2 Dope and Violent J) defeated Chuck Hogan, Mad Man Pondo, and Necro Butcher	Hardcore six man tag team match
(c) / – the champion(s) heading into the match
