= Gathering of the Juggalos 2003 =

2003 music festival organized by Psychopathic Records

- Promotional poster
- Date: July 17–20, 2003
- Venue: Nelson Ledges Quarry Park
- Locations: Garrettsville, Ohio, United States
- Previous event: 2002
- Next event: 2004
- Organizer: Psychopathic Records
- Website: juggalogathering.com

The 2003 Gathering of the Juggalos (also known as The Gathering or GOTJ) was a music festival organized by Psychopathic Records, a record label owned by the Detroit-based horrorcore hip-hop duo, the Insane Clown Posse. The festival took place from July 17 to July 20, 2003 at Nelson Ledges Quarry Park (also referred to as Crystal Forest) in Garrettsville, Ohio. This was also the first time that the Gathering of the Juggalos was held outdoors.

== Background ==
The Gathering of the Juggalos was created in 1999 when Rob Bruce, also known by his stagename "Jumpsteady", organized an event for all Juggalos, a concept long talked about by Insane Clown Posse. The first Gathering took place in Novi, Michigan at the Novi Expo Center on July 21–22, 2000, with roughly 2,000 fans in attendance. The festival featured concert performances, autograph sessions, seminars, wrestling hosted by Juggalo Championshxt Wrestling (JCW), tattooing, a haunted house, video games, contests, an ICP memorabilia museum and more. The second Gathering took place from July 13–15, 2001 at the Seagate Convention Centre in Toledo, Ohio. The event was controversially ended when the Toledo Police Department cut the Insane Clown Posse's concert at the festival short on July 15, 2001 which resulted in a riot.

During the 2002 Gathering of the Juggalos, a riot had broken out between 1,000 attendees and police that was caused by officers arresting a woman in the exhibit hall for baring her breasts. Tear gas, rubber bullets, and pepper spray were released into the crowd, however, representatitives from Psychopathic Records were able to negotiate with the police and the festival continued 30 minutes after the riot started.

== Performer lineup ==
The lineup for the 2003 Gathering of the Juggalos consisted of several notable names including Psychopathic Records-signed artists Twiztid, Zug Izland, Blaze Ya Dead Homie, Jumpsteady, Anybody Killa, and Esham, the industrial metal band Dope, rap-rock band Kottonmouth Kings, Jamaican rapper Bushwick Bill, Grammy Award-winning rapper Vanilla Ice, and the supergroup Dark Lotus. The festival was headlined by the Insane Clown Posse.

=== Main stage ===
Thursday (July 17)	Friday (July 18)	Saturday (July 19)	Sunday (July 20)
V-Sinzter	Jumpsteady; Dope; Esham; Dark Lotus	Blaze Ya Dead Homie; Zug Izland; Vanilla Ice; Twiztid	Killah Priest; Kottonmouth Kings; Anybody Killa; Bushwick Bill; Insane Clown Posse

== Professional wrestling production ==
Gathering of the Juggalos
- Promotion: Juggalo Championshxt Wrestling
- Date: July 18–19, 2003
- City: Garrettsville, Ohio
- Venue: Nelson Ledges Quarry Park

Juggalo Championshxt Wrestling event chronology
← Previous; Volume 3	Next → Gathering of the Juggalos

Gathering of the Juggalos chronology
← Previous; 2002	Next → 2004

=== Storylines ===
JCW's Gathering of the Juggalos events featured professional wrestling matches that involves different wrestlers from pre-existing scripted feuds and storylines. Wrestlers portrayed villains, heroes, or less distinguishable characters in scripted events that built tension and culminated in a wrestling match or series of matches. Storylines were produced on Juggalo Championshxt Wrestling's various events.

== Professional wrestling results ==
Night 1 - July 18, 2001
No.	Results	Stipulations
1	Breyer Wellington and Lenny Lane defeated Insane Clown Posse (Shaggy 2 Dope and Violent J)	Tag team match

Night 2 - July 19, 2001
No.	Results	Stipulations
1	Nosawa and The Insane Clown Posse (Shaggy 2 Dope and Violent J) defeated Breyer Wellington, Lenny Lane, and Monty Brown	Six man tag team match
