= Hatchet History: Ten Years of Terror =

Compilation album by Various Artists
- Released: August 6, 2002
- Label: Psychopathic Records

Professional ratings
Review scores
Source	Rating
Allmusic	2.5/5 stars

Hatchet History: Ten Years of Terror is a compilation album. Released in 2002, the album is a retrospective featuring tracks from various rappers and bands that had signed to Psychopathic Records up until that point, including Insane Clown Posse, Twiztid, Anybody Killa, Blaze Ya Dead Homie, Zug Izland, Myzery, Jumpsteady, and Dark Lotus.

== Track listing ==
#	Title	Time	Performer(s)	Original album
1	"Intro"	0:17		
2	"It's Time"	3:55	ICP	
3	"2nd Hand Smoke"	4:31	Twiztid	Mostasteless
4	"Gang Related"	4:38	Anybody Killa; ICP	Hatchet Warrior
5	"Toy Box"	4:26	ICP	Riddle Box
6	"Casket"	2:43	Blaze Ya Dead Homie	1 Less G n Da Hood
7	"Losin' It"	5:17	Project Born; Esham The Unholy	Project Born-Born Dead
8	"Sunny Day"	4:20	Zug Izland	Cracked Tiles
9	"If I Ever Die"	3:28	Myzery	Para La Isla
10	"Southwest Song"	4:56	ICP	Ringmaster
11	"Hollowpoint"	4:09	Anybody Killa	Hatchet Warrior
12	"Juggalo Anthem"	3:28	Blaze Ya Dead Homie	1 Less G n Da Hood
13	"Different"	3:30	Twiztid	Freek Show
14	"Slam!"	2:37	Zug Izland	Cracked Tiles
15	"Bitches!"	3:18	ICP; Ol' Dirty Bastard	The Amazing Jeckel Brothers
16	"Your The Reason"	5:19	Twiztid	Mirror Mirror
17	"Chaos Theory"	3:55	Jumpsteady	The Chaos Theory
18	"Juggalo Family"	6:09	Dark Lotus	Tales from the Lotus Pod
