= Big Money Rustlas =

2010 American comedy film by Paul Andresen

- Directed by: Paul Andresen
- Screenplay by: Joseph Bruce; Paul Andresen; Studebaker Duchamp
- Story by: Joseph Bruce
- Produced by: Chris Kraft
- Starring: Violent J Shaggy 2 Dope; Jamie Madrox; Monoxide; Jason Mewes; Mark Jury
- Cinematography: Paul Andresen
- Edited by: Pascal Leister
- Music by: Jim Manzie; Edgar Rothermich
- Distributed by: Psychopathic; Fontana; Vivendi
- Release dates: January 17, 2010 (Detroit, Michigan); August 17, 2010 (Home video)
- Running time: 95 minutes
- Country: United States
- Language: English
- Budget: $1.5 million

Big Money Rustlas is a 2010 American revisionist Western comedy film directed by Paul Andresen. The film is a prequel to the 2000 film Big Money Hustlas. Joseph Bruce wrote the story, and he, Andresen, and Studebaker Duchamp adapted the story into a screenplay. Their writing was influenced by classic Western films, classic Warner Bros. cartoons, and the film Blazing Saddles.

Gambling tycoon Big Baby Chips (Joseph Bruce), along with his assistants Raw Stank (Jamie Spaniolo) and Dusty Poot (Monoxide), run the downtrodden town of Mud Bug through extortion and violence. Sheriff Sugar Wolf (Joseph Utsler) arrives in town to confront Big Baby Chips, redeem his family name, and save the town. The film's tagline is "The Good, the Bad, and the ... Outrageous," a parody of the film The Good, the Bad and the Ugly. Big Money Rustlas premiered on January 23, 2010 at The Fillmore Detroit in Detroit, Michigan and was released direct-to-video on August 17, 2010.

== Plot ==
Sheriff Sugar Wolf (Utsler) returns to his hometown after many years to find that it has been taken over by Big Baby Chips (Bruce), a ruthless gambling tycoon who has run the downtrodden town of Mud Bug with his gang of thugs, which include Raw Stank (Jamie Madrox) and Dusty Poot (Monoxide), since killing Sugar Wolf's father, Grizzly Wolf (Ron Jeremy), and Sugar's brothers. Sugar decides to take over the position his father once held, leading Big Baby Chips to pit Sugar against a series of deadly assassins.

Sugar Wolf begins to successfully dispatch all of his would-be assassins, winning the approval of the townfolk, begins a romance with Tink (Bridget Powerz), a little person, and takes on a deputy, Bucky (Mewes). After Sugar Wolf jails Raw Stank and Dusty Poot, Big Baby Chips calls in his deadliest assassin, which turns out to be Tink, who, in reality, is a bearded man in drag, Tank (Jody Sadler), who cripples Sugar Wolf's shooting hand, but Sugar kills him with dynamite. Dirty Sanchez (Mark Jury), a former rival of Big Baby Chips, whose hands had been crippled by Big Baby Chips, trains Sugar Wolf to fight with his other hand. Sugar Wolf challenges Big Baby Chips to a showdown, and guns down the gambler, who reveals himself to be Grizzly Wolf.

== Cast ==
- Violent J as "Big Baby" Chips
- Shaggy 2 Dope as "Sugar" Wolf
- Jamie Spaniolo as "Raw Stank"
- Monoxide as "Dusty Poot"
- Jason Mewes as "Bucky"
- Mark Jury as "Dirty" Sanchez
- Boondox as "The Ghost"
- 2 Tuff Tony as "The Foot"
- Bridget Powerz as "Tink"
- Jimmy Hart as "Big Winner"
- Brigitte Nielsen as Lady
- Jimmie Walker as Man
- Eric Geller as Sheriff Fred Freckles
- Cindie Haynie as "Mama" Wolf
- Ron Jeremy as "Grizzly" Wolf
- Jody Sadler as "Tank"
- Scott Hall as Sign Guy
- Jumpsteady as Hack Benjamin
- Rick Mora as Native American
- William Joseph Elk III as Native American
- Tom Sizemore as Himself
- David Yow as Piano Player
- Vanilla Ice as Heckler #3

== Production ==
We're an independent record company, and we're still learning the ropes as far as motion pictures. We filmed the movie, and rather than just put it out on DVD, we're going to try to do the most with it we can. We're still submitting it to all the movie festivals, the Cannes Film Festival, and all the stuff like that. We're still learning how to get the most out of this movie. So we're hiring people [and] we're working with people [that are] going to really help put this movie out in a big way.

— Joseph Bruce on the project's post-production and delay

The film's director, Paul Andresen, had previously worked with Joseph Bruce and Joseph Utsler on the long-form music video Bowling Balls. Andresen was enthusiastic to work on the film because of previous experiences with Psychopathic Records, and Bruce's sense of humor. Paul Methric described the production as being more organized than that of Big Money Hustlas. According to Methric, "The first one was, let's shoot it 45 times, then shoot it another 45 times, where this one the guys knew exactly what we needed, and we got in there and got it."

In an interview for Pro Wrestling Torch's Torch Daily Blitz, Bruce stated that the release of Big Money Rustlas was delayed from its original 2009 release to early 2010 due to extra post-production. He said that the Psychopathic Video department was still trying to learn how to work in the film industry. To better improve the quality of the film, Bruce said that Psychopathic Video had hired people from within the film industry to help with production.

=== Origins ===
Bruce and Utsler had a negative experience with the New York style of production and "asshole art film crews" while filming Big Money Hustlas. Following the release of the movie, the two made plans to produce a Western prequel, which would be filmed in California in order to avoid the previous issues. In the packaging of their 2000 album Bizaar, Insane Clown Posse released an image of what would later be the characters Raw Stank and Dusty Poot.

Bruce and Utsler continued to talk about the movie over the next eight years, though no actions were taken to start pre-production of the film. The two were encouraged to move forward with the production of Big Money Rustlas after starring in the 2008 film Death Racers. According to Bruce, "We knew we could do better and we'd have a way bigger budget. And we thought, 'We can pull this off.'"

=== Story and setting ===
In 2008, Bruce wrote the original screenplay for Big Money Rustlas in a two-week span while touring in support of Dark Lotus' The Opaque Brotherhood album. Bruce's original screenplay was only 40 pages long; director Paul Andresen and screenwriter Studebaker Duchamp expanded the screenplay to 70 pages. Andresen states that the film was influenced by classic Western films and classic Warner Bros. cartoons. Bruce stated that he loved the Man with No Name Trilogy, as well as Mel Brooks' Blazing Saddles, and that the latter was a strong influence on Big Money Rustlas, due to its comedic anachronisms. Andresen and Bruce wanted the film to place more emphasis on humor than the over-the-top violence that Insane Clown Posse's music is known for.

=== Casting ===
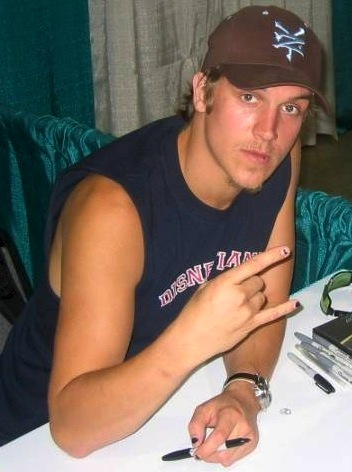
Jason Mewes portrays Sugar Wolf's deputy sheriff Bucky.

The film follows a similar casting style to the first film Big Money Hustlas. In addition to the main cast, cameos include musicians Blaze, Mike E. Clark, DJ Clay, Anybody Killa, Bonez Dubb and Otis of Axe Murder Boyz, Daddy X and Taxman of Kottonmouth Kings, Daddy Long Legs and Buddha of Wolfpac, Awesome Dre, The Jesus Lizard vocalist David Yow, and Vanilla Ice, professional wrestlers Corporal Robinson, Terry Brunk, Scott Hall, Scott D'Amore, Jimmy Hart, and Joe Doering. Established actors who appear include Jason Mewes, Dustin Diamond, Tom Sizemore, Todd Bridges, Jimmie Walker, and Brigitte Nielsen.

Violent J, Shaggy 2 Dope, Jamie Madrox, Monoxide, and Jumpsteady were cast to reprise ancestral versions of their roles from Big Money Hustlas. The role of Dirty Sanchez was originally written for Scott Hall. The part was later given to Mark Jury, who had worked with director Paul Andresen and Insane Clown Posse twice before. As with the first film, Wolf's love interest was played by a pornographic actress, Bridget Powerz, and his sidekick was played by an established actor, Jason Mewes.

The role of Sugar Wolf offered Shaggy 2 Dope much more room for improvisation than there had been in playing Sugar Bear in Big Money Hustlas, where all of his dialogue had to be performed in Dolemite-style rhymes; Shaggy 2 Dope was unsatisfied that he was unable to improvise in that film for this reason.

=== Filming ===
Filming began in mid-January 2009 at Paramount Ranch in the Santa Monica Mountains, California, and concluded on February 24, 2009. The film's budget was $1.5 million. During filming, Joseph Bruce was harassed by a police officer due to local law enforcement's classification of Juggalos as a gang.

== Release ==
The film's trailer premiered at the 10th annual Gathering of the Juggalos, where it was screened twice. Bruce and Utsler plan to tour theaters around the country to screen the film. Bruce also announced that the film would be sent in to multiple film festivals. The film premiered at The Fillmore Detroit on January 23, 2010. The DVD was released locally at the 11th annual Gathering of the Juggalos, and nationally on August 17, 2010.

== Reception ==
Tex Hula from Ain't It Cool News rated the film one of the worst he had ever seen, saying "This movie has the mentality of a third grader who just learned all his curse words, and he's going to use them constantly because he thinks they're hilarious. This 'movie' is so obnoxious it goes way past the point of being unbearable. One of the most painful films I've had to endure. Not for the column, in my life."
