= Gathering of the Juggalos 2001 =

2001 music festival organized by Psychopathic Records

- Promotional poster
- Date: July 13–15, 2001
- Venue: Seagate Convention Centre
- Locations: Toledo, Ohio, United States
- Previous event: 2000
- Next event: 2002
- Attendance: 6,600
- Organizer: Psychopathic Records
- Website: juggalogathering.com

The 2001 Gathering of the Juggalos (also known as The Gathering or GOTJ) was a music festival organized by Psychopathic Records, a record label owned by the Detroit-based horrorcore hip-hop duo, the Insane Clown Posse. The festival took place from July 13 to July 15, 2001 at the Seagate Convention Centre in Toledo, Ohio.

== Background ==
The Gathering of the Juggalos was created in 1999 when Rob Bruce, also known by his stagename "Jumpsteady", organized an event for all Juggalos, a concept long talked about by Insane Clown Posse. The first Gathering took place in Novi, Michigan at the Novi Expo Center on July 21–22, 2000, with roughly 2,000 fans in attendance. The festival featured concert performances, autograph sessions, seminars, wrestling hosted by Juggalo Championshxt Wrestling (JCW), tattooing, a haunted house, video games, contests, an ICP memorabilia museum and more. The second Gathering was announced in early 2001 with one of the first performers on the lineup announced being the Three Six Mafia.

== Performer lineup ==
The lineup for the 2001 Gathering of the Juggalos consisted of several notable names including Psychopathic Records-signed artists Three Six Mafia, Blaze Ya Dead Homie, supergroups Dark Lotus and Psychopathic Rydas, Grammy Award-winning rapper Vanilla Ice, and Croatian rapper Marz. The event was headlined by the Insane Clown Posse. The Suicide Machines were initially scheduled to perform but they were absent from the show. 3rd Strike, a California-based nu metal band took the Suicide Machines' place.

=== Main stage ===
Friday (July 13)	Saturday (July 14)	Sunday (July 15)
Myzery; Twiztid; 3rd Strike; Organ Grinders	Marz; Blaze Ya Dead Homie; Bone Thugs-N-Harmony; Dark Lotus	Vanilla Ice; Psychopathic Rydas; Three Six Mafia; Insane Clown Posse

== Professional wrestling production ==
Gathering of the Juggalos
- Promotion: Juggalo Championshxt Wrestling
- Date: July 14-15, 2001
- City: Toledo, Ohio
- Venue: Seagate Convention Centre

Gathering of the Juggalos chronology
← Previous; 2000	Next → 2002

=== Storylines ===
JCW's Gathering of the Juggalos events featured professional wrestling matches that involves different wrestlers from pre-existing scripted feuds and storylines. Wrestlers portrayed villains, heroes, or less distinguishable characters in scripted events that built tension and culminated in a wrestling match or series of matches. Storylines were produced on Juggalo Championshxt Wrestling's various events.

== Professional wrestling results ==
Night 1 - July 14, 2001
No.	Results	Stipulations
1	The Rainbow Coalition (Bob and Neil) defeated The Insane Clown Posse (Shaggy 2 Dope and Violent J)	Tag team match for the JCW Tag Team Championship
2	Sabu won a battle royal	Battle royal for the vacant JCW Heavyweight Championship

Night 2 - July 15, 2001
No.	Results	Stipulations
1	Shaggy 2 Dope defeated Breyer Wellington	Singles match
2	Greg Valentine vs. The Rude Boy ended in a no contest	Dog collar match
3	The Insane Clown Posse (Shaggy 2 Dope and Violent J) defeated The Rainbow Coalition (Bob and Neil) (c)	Tag team match for the JCW Tag Team Championship
4	Vampiro defeated Sabu (c)	Singles match for the JCW Heavyweight Championship
(c) / – the champion(s) heading into the match

== Aftermath ==
The festival came to a close when the Toledo Police Department cut the Insane Clown Posse's concert at the festival short before the half-way point of their set. The fans destroyed the set and police had arrested 30 attendees in total for various crimes including disorderly conduct, alleged sexual assault, destruction of property, vandalism, and punching a police horse according to Sgt. Richard Murphy. During the festival, numerous musicians signed to Psychopathic Records got involved in a large-scale brawl at a hotel adjacent to the Seagate Convention Centre, resulting in numerous arrests, however, police were unable to provide details in regards to the brawl.
