= Morton's List =

Role-playing game

- Cover of boxed set
- Publishers: Dark Carnival Games, LLC.
- Website: http://www.mortonslist.com/

Morton's List is a game published by Dark Carnival Games, LLC. It is a "Random Reality" game in which players participate in a randomly generated task or activity.

== Description ==
Morton's List is presented as a 402-page book. A "Table Master" is randomly selected from among the players to lead the game and arbitrate disagreements. Assembled players take an oath to spend at least an hour participating in the yet-to-be-determined task, which unlike other roleplaying games is not an imaginary or simulated activity, but a real-world mission. The Table Master rolls a 30-sided die to choose one of 360 possible "Quests." The players then discuss how to interpret and execute the Quest. During this discussion the players are encouraged to use creativity to find not only a viable interpretation, but one which is both fun for all players, and in accordance with the moral code of all players.

== Controversy ==
Morton's List claims to include any possible activity that people might do for fun. As such, it includes directives that might be interpreted as encouraging illegal or dangerous activities such as "vigilantism, real life spell casting, and to experiment with potentially illegal substances." For this reason the game was banned from Gen Con, one of the largest toy and game trade shows in the United States. Morton's List players have been arrested while doing their Quests.

== Connection with Insane Clown Posse ==
One of the game's three creators, Robert Bruce, is the older brother of Violent J of the rap group Insane Clown Posse. Bruce has appeared as a rapper, Jumpsteady, on ICP albums and has served as vice president of the band's record label, Psychopathic Records. Because of this connection, the game has been frequently promoted to the band's fan base, including their annual music festival, the Gathering of the Juggalos.

== Withdrawal ==
Physical copies of the book were withdrawn from sale at the end of 2012. Remaining copies were destroyed, making the game difficult to find in physical form.
