= Gathering of the Juggalos 2002 =

2002 music festival organized by Psychopathic Records

- Promotional poster
- Date: July 19–21, 2002
- Venue: Peoria Civic Center
- Locations: Peoria, Illinois, United States
- Previous event: 2001
- Next event: 2003
- Attendance: 8,000+
- Organizer: Psychopathic Records
- Website: juggalogathering.com

The 2002 Gathering of the Juggalos (also known as The Gathering or GOTJ) was a music festival organized by Psychopathic Records, a record label owned by the Detroit-based horrorcore hip-hop duo, the Insane Clown Posse. The festival took place from July 19 to July 21, 2002 at the Peoria Civic Center in Peoria, Illinois.

== Background ==
The Gathering of the Juggalos was created in 1999 when Rob Bruce, also known by his stagename "Jumpsteady", organized an event for all Juggalos, a concept long talked about by Insane Clown Posse. The first Gathering took place in Novi, Michigan at the Novi Expo Center on July 21–22, 2000, with roughly 2,000 fans in attendance. The festival featured concert performances, autograph sessions, seminars, wrestling hosted by Juggalo Championshxt Wrestling (JCW), tattooing, a haunted house, video games, contests, an ICP memorabilia museum and more. The second Gathering took place from July 13–15, 2001 at the Seagate Convention Centre in Toledo, Ohio. The event was controversially ended when the Toledo Police Department cut the Insane Clown Posse's concert at the festival short on July 15, 2001 which resulted in a riot.

== Performer lineup ==
The lineup for the 2002 Gathering of the Juggalos consisted of several notable names including Psychopathic Records-signed artists Twiztid, Zug Izland, Blaze Ya Dead Homie, Anybody Killa, and Esham, the Dallas, Texas-based rock band Ghoultown, nu metal rock band Primer 55, and supergroups Dark Lotus and Psychopathic Rydas. The festival was headlined by the Insane Clown Posse. The Canadian rock band Kittie was scheduled to perform at the festival, but they had cancelled their concert due to scheduling conflicts.

=== Carver Arena main stage ===
Friday (July 19)	Saturday (July 20)	Sunday (July 21)
Ghoultown; Blaze Ya Dead Homie; Primer 55; Dark Lotus	Anybody Killa; Zug Izland; Esham; Twiztid	Psychopathic Rydas; Mack 10; Bubba Sparxxx; Insane Clown Posse

== Professional wrestling production ==
Gathering of the Juggalos
- Promotion: Juggalo Championshxt Wrestling
- Date: July 20–21, 2002
- City: Peoria, Illinois
- Venue: Peoria Civic Center

Gathering of the Juggalos chronology
← Previous; 2001	Next → 2003

=== Storylines ===
JCW's Gathering of the Juggalos events featured professional wrestling matches that involves different wrestlers from pre-existing scripted feuds and storylines. Wrestlers portrayed villains, heroes, or less distinguishable characters in scripted events that built tension and culminated in a wrestling match or series of matches. Storylines were produced on Juggalo Championshxt Wrestling's various events.

== Professional wrestling results ==
Night 1 - July 20, 2002
No.	Results	Stipulations
1	Breyer Wellington (c) vs. Chris Candido ended in a draw	Singles match for the JCW Heavyweight Championship
(c) / – the champion(s) heading into the match

Night 2 - July 21, 2001
No.	Results	Stipulations
1	Shaggy 2 Dope won a battle royal	Battle royal for the vacant JCW Heavyweight Championship
2	Breyer Wellington defeated Shaggy 2 Dope (c)	Singles match for the JCW Heavyweight Championship
(c) / – the champion(s) heading into the match

== Aftermath ==
On the Saturday of the festival, a riot had broken out between 1,000 attendees and the Peoria Police Department after officers had arrested a woman in the exhibit hall for baring her breasts, which resulted in tear gas, rubber bullets, and pepper spray being released into the crowd. Psychopathic Records representatives Rob Bruce and Alex Abbiss negotiated with the police and the festival continued 30 minutes after the riot. Eight people in total were arrested during the event and 19 ordiance violations were handed out to the festival.
