= Horror Slam Wrestling =

American professional wrestling promotion

- Acronym: Horror Slam
- Founded: October 2017
- Style: Hardcore wrestling
- Headquarters: Livonia, Michigan
- Founder(s): Breyer Wellington; Rachael Green
- Owner(s): Breyer Wellington; Rachael Green

Horror Slam Wrestling (Horror Slam) is an American independent professional wrestling promotion owned by Breyer Wellington and Rachael Green.

== History ==
On October 20, 2017, Horror Slam held their first event in partnership with Pro Wrestling All Stars of Detroit (PWASD) at Rocky's Pub in Riverview, Michigan in which one of the matches was a thumbtack match featuring Chuck Stein going up against Horror Slam owner Breyer Wellington. On December 8, 2017, Horror Slam crowned the inaugural Horror Slam Heavyweight Champion in a battle royal during their Nightmare Before Christmas event in which Chuck Stein defeated became the inaugural champion. On October 19, 2018, the inaugural Horror Slam Deathmatch Champion was crowned when Peter B. Beautiful defeated Chuck Stein, Dysfunction, Jeff King, and Orin Veidt.

On September 1, 2021, Horror Slam held a joint show with the New Jersey-based national independent professional wrestling promotion Game Changer Wrestling (GCW) at the Knights of Columbus Hall in Detroit, Michigan, and was also GCW's first ever show in the state of Michigan. Breyer Wellington also took part in the show himself and fought in a Detroit death match against former GCW Tag Team Champion Jimmy Lloyd. GCW and Horror Slam would continue to host cross-promotional events until 2023.

On May 10, 2024, JJ Escobar won the Horror Slam Heavyweight Championship after defeating Tommy Trainwreck during the Crimson Mask event. On September 17, 2024, Horror Slam held its third annual Murder City Death Match Cup tournament which featured Chuck Stein, Dr. Redacted, Drake Younger, Malcolm Monroe III, Randi West, JJ Escobar, Jeff King, and Tommy Vendetta.

On October 12, 2024, Horror Slam held its 7th anniversary show at the Elk's Lodge in Livonia, Michigan. Titled Underground Monsters, the event also featured talent from We Love Wrestling (WLW) and Juggalo Championship Wrestling (JCW) and also featured Breyer Wellington defending the Horror Slam Horrorcore Championship against Schwartzy along with Chuck Stein defending the Horror Slam Deathmatch Championship against Shane Mercer.

On November 29, 2024, Horror Slam began a partnership with ICW No Holds Barred and held their first co-produced show. Titled ICW No Holds Barred x Horror Slam Volume 66, the event took place at the Livonia Elk's Lodge in Livonia, Michigan, and was streamed live on IndependentWrestling.tv with the main event being Atticus Cogar defending the ICW American Deathmatch World Championship against Malcolm Monroe III. On April 4, 2025 during the ICW No Holds Barred x Horror Slam Volume 72 event, Bobby Beverly won the ICW American Deathmatch World Championship by defeating the defending champion Atticus Cogar.

On June 13, 2025, Tommy Trainwreck defended the Horror Slam Deathmatch Championship against Mickie Knuckles during the promotion's Friday The 13th event at the World of Games bar in Southgate, Michigan.

== Championships ==
=== Current ===
Championship	Current champion(s)	Date won	Days held	Location
Horror Slam Deathmatch Championship	Chuck Stein	October 24, 2025	338+	Southgate, Michigan
Horror Slam Heavyweight Championship	Dean Hendrix	December 12, 2025	289+	Livonia, Michigan
Horror Slam Horrorcore Championship	The Solution	January 25, 2025	610+	Lincoln Park, Michigan
Horror Slam Tag Team Championship	Terminate on Sight (Big Dom and Machine Gun Bishop)	March 13, 2026	198+	Livonia, Michigan
Horror Slam Undeniable Championship	Kyle Barrett	February 24, 2023	1,311+	Brownstown, Michigan
