= Master of the Flying Guillotine (album) =

Studio album by Jumpsteady
- Released: February 22, 2005
- Recorded: 2003–2005
- Studio: The Lotus Pod (Detroit, MI)
- Genre: Hip-hop
- Length: 1:00:42
- Label: Psychopathic
- Producer: Delusional; Jumpsteady; Violent J

Jumpsteady chronology
| The Chaos Theory (2002) | Master of the Flying Guillotine (2005) |

Professional ratings
Review scores
| Source | Rating |
|---|---|
| AllMusic | 3/5 stars |
| RapReviews | 5/10 |

Master of the Flying Guillotine is the only full-length studio album by American rapper and record producer Jumpsteady. It was released on February 22, 2005 via Psychopathic Records. Recording sessions took place at the Lotus Pod in Detroit. Production was handled by Jumpsteady himself together with Violent J and Delusional, alongside co-producers Lavel, Fritz The Cat and Jeff McAlear. It features contributions from Delusional, Jennifer Legree, Michelle Rapp, Myzery, Samantha, Violent J, Fritz The Cat and DJ Short Buzz.

The album debuted at number 78 on the Top R&B/Hip-Hop Albums, number 31 on the Independent Albums and number 21 on the Heatseekers Albums charts in the United States.

== Track listing ==
| No. | Title | Lyrics | Music | Producer(s) | Length |
|---|---|---|---|---|---|
| 1. | "Intro" | | | | 0:49 |
| 2. | "Master of the Flying Guillotine" | Robert Bruce | Fritz Vankosky | Jumpsteady; Lavel (co.); Fritz the Cat (co.) | 3:45 |
| 3. | "Ima" | R. Bruce; Joseph Bruce | Vankosky | Jumpsteady; Violent J (co.) | 3:25 |
| 4. | "If" | R. Bruce | Vankosky | Jumpsteady; Violent J (co.) | 3:32 |
| 5. | "Crom Skit" | | | | 0:38 |
| 6. | "Revenge" | R. Bruce | Michael J. Puwal | Jumpsteady; Lavel (co.) | 3:23 |
| 7. | "My Mans an Them" | R. Bruce; Nene Encarnacion | Vankosky | Jumpsteady; Violent J (co.) | 3:49 |
| 8. | "Spur of the Moment" | R. Bruce; Bryan Glick | Bryan Glick; Ben Shader | Delusional; Jumpsteady; Jeff McAlear (co.); Lavel (co.) | 3:37 |
| 9. | "Crazy Straight" | R. Bruce | Polar Bear | Jumpsteady; Lavel (co.) | 1:48 |
| 10. | "Battlefield" | R. Bruce; Samantha Encarnacion | Vankosky | Jumpsteady; Lavel (co.); Fritz the Cat (co.) | 4:32 |
| 11. | "There She Was" | R. Bruce | Vankosky | Jumpsteady; Fritz the Cat (co.) | 4:12 |
| 12. | "Universal Air Stance" | | James Hicks | Violent J; Fritz the Cat (co.); Jumpsteady (co.) | 2:35 |
| 13. | "Sonar Skit" | | | | 0:43 |
| 14. | "Dungeon Master" | R. Bruce | Puwal | Jumpsteady; Lavel (co.) | 4:06 |
| 15. | "Amy's Ghost" | R. Bruce | Hicks; Robert Bruce | Jumpsteady; Lavel (co.) | 2:52 |
| 16. | "The Obsolete Man" | R. Bruce | Vankosky | Jumpsteady; Fritz the Cat (co.) | 2:12 |
| 17. | "Thirteenth Skull" | R. Bruce | Esham Smith; Vankosky; Joseph Bruce; Hicks | Jumpsteady; Violent J (co.); Lavel (co.); Fritz the Cat (co.) | 10:35 |
| 18. | "True Stories Two" | R. Bruce | Hicks; R. Bruce | Jumpsteady; Lavel (co.) | 3:56 |
| Total length: | | | | | 1:00:42 |

== Personnel ==
- Robert "Jumpsteady" Bruce — lyrics & producer (tracks: 2–4, 6–11, 14–18), composer (tracks: 15, 18), co-producer (track 12), concept (tracks: 2–4, 6, 7, 10, 11, 12, 14–18)
- Joseph "Violent J" Bruce — lyrics (track 3), composer (track 17), producer (track 12), co-producer (tracks: 3, 4, 7, 17), engineering (tracks: 3, 7, 17), mixing (tracks: 2, 3, 7, 17)
- Nene "Myzery" Encarnacion — lyrics (track 7)
- Bryan "Delusional" Glick — lyrics, composer & producer (track 8), concept (tracks: 8, 9)
- Samantha Encarnacion — lyrics & concept (track 10)
- James "Lavel" Hicks — additional vocals (tracks: 2, 6, 7), composer (tracks: 12, 15, 17, 18), co-producer (tracks: 2, 6, 8–10, 14, 15, 17, 18), engineering (tracks: 2–4, 6–11, 14, 15, 17), mixing (tracks: 2, 4, 6, 8–11, 14, 15, 17)
- Jennifer Legree — vocals (track 11)
- DJ Short Buzz — scratches (track 12)
- Michelle Rapp — vocals (track 15)
- Fritz "The Cat" Vankosky — guitar (track 17), composer (tracks: 2–4, 7, 10, 11, 16, 17), co-producer (tracks: 2, 10, 11, 12, 16, 17), engineering (tracks: 2, 8, 12, 16, 17, 18), mixing (tracks: 12, 16, 17, 18)
- Michael "Mike P." Puwal — composer (tracks: 6, 14)
- Ben Shader — composer (track 8)
- Polar Bear — composer (track 9)
- Esham A. Smith — composer (track 17)
- Jeff McAlear — co-producer, engineering & mixing (track 8)

== Charts ==
| Chart (2005) | Peak position |
|---|---|
| US Top R&B/Hip-Hop Albums (Billboard) | 78 |
| US Independent Albums (Billboard) | 31 |
| US Heatseekers Albums (Billboard) | 21 |
