= The Mud, Water, Air & Blood =

Studio album by Dark Lotus
- Released: July 29, 2014
- Recorded: February – June 2014
- Genre: Hip-hop
- Length: 54:41
- Label: Psychopathic
- Producer: Fritz the Cat, Kuma, Otis, Seven

Dark Lotus chronology
The Opaque Brotherhood (2008)	The Mud, Water, Air & Blood (2014)

The Mud, Water, Air & Blood is the fourth and final studio album by Dark Lotus. The album was released on July 29, 2014.

Professional ratings
Review scores
Source	Rating
AllMusic	2.5/5 stars

== Background ==
In a February 2014 interview with Faygoluvers.net Insane Clown Posse announced that they were getting ready to hit the studio and record a Dark Lotus album in 2014. On March 12, 2014, Insane Clown Posse, Twiztid and Blaze Ya Dead Homie's media outlets a picture was posted by each one with the DL sign and roman numerals translating to (7/29/2014). It was later revealed that the album will be released on July 29, 2014, but will initially be released at the 2014 GOTJ.

== Track listing ==
No.	Title	Producer(s)	Length
1.	"The Mud, Water, Air and Blood"	Kuma	1:47
2.	"Garden of Evil"	Kuma	3:38
3.	"My Head Is Haunted"	Seven	4:33
4.	"Death in a Jar"	Seven	4:16
5.	"The Mud"	Otis	0:39
6.	"Debbie in the Dark"	Kuma	3:05
7.	"Morbid"	Kuma	3:10
8.	"My Kinda Party"	Seven	4:16
9.	"Price of Life"	Fritz The Cat	3:39
10.	"The Water"	Kuma	0:35
11.	"Villainous" (featuring Anybody Killa)	Kuma	3:45
12.	"45 Minutes"	Seven	4:07
13.	"Coagulate"	Fritz the Cat	5:21
14.	"The Air"	Otis	0:28
15.	"The Drought"	Seven	4:42
16.	"Let It Rain" (featuring Legz Diamond and Sugar Slam)	Kuma	6:38

== Personnel ==
- Insane Clown Posse - vocals, lyrics
- Twiztid - vocals, lyrics
- Blaze Ya Dead Homie - vocals, lyrics
- Anybody Killa - guest verse on "Villainous"
- Kuma - producer (1, 2, 6, 7, 10, 11, 16)
- Legz Diamond - Additional vocals on "Let It Rain"
- Michelle Bruce - Additional vocals on "Let It Rain"
- Seven - producer (3, 4, 8, 12, 15)
- Fritz The Cat - producer (9, 13)
- Young Wicked (Otis) - producer (5, 14)

== Charts ==
Chart (2014)	Peak position
US Billboard 200	43
US Top R&B/Hip-Hop Albums (Billboard)	8
