= The Chaos Theory =

EP by Jumpsteady
- Released: July 23, 2002
- Studio: Lotus Pod (Farmington Hills, Michigan)
- Genre: Hardcore hip hop
- Length: 34:40
- Label: Psychopathic Records
- Producer: Jumpsteady

Jumpsteady chronology
The Chaos Theory (2002)	Master of the Flying Guillotine (2005)

Professional ratings
Review scores
Source	Rating
AllMusic	2/5 stars

The Chaos Theory is the only EP by American rapper Jumpsteady. It was advertised in the booklet of Tunnel of Love and was originally scheduled for a 1997 release, but was delayed several years. It was eventually released on July 23, 2002.

== Track listing ==
No.	Title	Producer(s)	Length
1.	"Intro"		0:28
2.	"Out Cha Mouth"	Fritz the Cat	4:02
3.	"In the Last Second"	Mike P.	4:21
4.	"Mad Mad World"	Fritz the Cat	5:26
5.	"The Chaos Theory"	Fritz the Cat	4:22
6.	"Ninjas in Action" (featuring Blaze Ya Dead Homie, Insane Clown Posse, Twiztid, Anybody Killa, Legz Diamond and Syn)	John, Ponch	6:47
7.	"Joke Ya Mind"	Mike P.	6:14
8.	"Sammy Song"	Fritz the Cat	2:56
Total length:			34:40

== Personnel ==
Information taken from AllMusic.

=== Musicians ===
- Jumpsteady — vocals
- Blaze — vocals
- Guido — bass
- Insane Clown Posse — vocals
- Jumpsteady — vocals, liner notes
- Jamie Madrox — vocals
- Twiztid — vocals
- Violent J — vocals

=== Additional personnel ===
- Fritz the Cat — programming, producer, engineer
- "Ninjas In Action" beat sampled from Chips theme song
