= Tales from the Lotus Pod =

Tales From The Lotus Pod

Studio album by Dark Lotus
- Released: July 17, 2001
- Studio: Lotus Pod (Farmington Hills, Michigan)
- Length: 70:52; 66:19 (reissue)
- Label: Psychopathic Records
- Producers: Mike E. Clark; Fritz "The Cat" Van Kosky

Dark Lotus chronology
Tales From The Lotus Pod (2001)	Black Rain (2004)

Tales from the Lotus Pod
- 2002 reissue.

Tales from the Lotus Pod is the first album by American hip-hop group Dark Lotus. Released on July 17, 2001, the album featured the only appearance of former member Marz, who was soon dismissed from the group. This was the first Insane Clown Posse/Twiztid related album to be released after their label Psychopathic Records left Island Records.

== Production ==
Insane Clown Posse and Twiztid recorded a collaboration called "Echoside" under the name Dark Lotus. The song was released as a single in 1999, with all-black artwork and labels. The song was intended to appear on the Dark Lotus album Tales from the Lotus Pod, but because the album's production took longer than expected, it was instead released on ICP's 1999 album The Amazing Jeckel Brothers. Between this time, Blaze Ya Dead Homie joined the group, and Insane Clown Posse toured with the rap metal band Marz, whose leader, also named Marz, was impressed by ICP's performance style, and was embraced by the Juggalo fanbase. Joseph Bruce made plans to sign Marz to Psychopathic and have him join Dark Lotus, but Marz was still signed with another label, E-Magine Records. However, he claimed that he could get out of his contract with the label in order to join Psychopathic.

Although the rest of Dark Lotus was not as impressed with Marz as Bruce was, Marz joined the group and recorded vocals for Tales from the Lotus Pod. Mike E. Clark was brought in to produce the album, but left the project after producing four songs. Fritz "the Cat" Van Kosky was brought in to finish the album. Mike Puwal contributed guitars and other instruments and also contributed to mixing the album alongside Bruce, Puwal, and Fritz the Cat.

Marz provoked an argument between the other members of the group, when he wrote a "blasphemous and vulgar" verse that led Twiztid to try to get Marz's verse rewritten, saying that they were "not going to hell for this album", but Violent J refused, saying "No way bro. We’re gonna keep that".

Marz also was featured on Psychopathic's 2001 sampler, but ultimately never signed with the label. This ultimately led to a dispute between Insane Clown Posse and Marz. Marz recorded a diss track towards ICP, saying that he "was the Sixth Joker's Card".

== Reception ==
Professional ratings
Review scores
Source	Rating
AllRovi	2.5/5 stars
MSN	2/5 stars

The album peaked at No. 1 on the Billboard Heatseekers chart, No. 158 on the Billboard 200 and No. 6 on the Top Independent Albums chart.

== Legacy ==
Violent J ultimately did not like the completed album, finding it to be "too morbid, dark and slow. I love the raps and music, but it just puts me into a mood I don't like." Additionally, he felt that the album was tarnished by his negative experiences during its recording, and the tours associated with it, including his falling out with Mike E. Clark, Marz's contributions to the album, and his panic attacks.

In 2002, the album was reissued in a different version that excised Marz's vocals, which were replaced by newly recorded verses performed by Anybody Killa. Bruce declared the reissue of the album to be the "definitive" version.

During the 2016 Gathering of the Juggalos, it was announced that the 2017 Juggalo Day Show was going to feature Dark Lotus headlining doing Tales from the Lotus Pod in its entirety. After ICP had a falling out with Twiztid in early 2017 due to a feeling of betrayal for signing former Psychopathic Records artists to their own label Majik Ninja Entertainment, it was announced that the Dark Lotus performance at Juggalo Day was canceled and that the group has officially disbanded.

== Track listing ==
Although there are no track titles listed on the album's back cover, they have been listed elsewhere.

No.	Title	Length
1.	"Intro"	1:21
2.	"Ali Baba"	4:21
3.	"Something"	4:00
4.	"Hurt Myself"	5:09
5.	"Call Upon Your Gods"	4:57
6.	"And We Danced"	4:36
7.	"Black Magic"	4:56
8.	"Gimme Dat Blood"	3:39
9.	"Headache"	5:36
10.	"Bad Rep"	4:47
11.	"Bitch I'm Sexy"	3:30
12.	"Swarm"	4:45
13.	"I Wanna Die"	3:51
14.	"The Crows"	3:52
15.	"Juggalo Family"	6:06
16.	"Dot Com"	4:46
Total length:		66:20

Notes

- "Something"'s length is longer in the original version of the album.
- "Black Magic" is stylized as "cigaM kcalB" in streaming services such as iTunes.
