= Black Rain (Dark Lotus album) =

Studio album by Dark Lotus
- Released: April 6, 2004
- Length: 56:10
- Label: Psychopathic Records
- Producers: Fritz "The Cat" Van Kosky, Mike P, Esham, The R.O.C., Lavel, Dark Lotus

Dark Lotus chronology
Tales From The Lotus Pod (2001)	Black Rain (2004)	The Opaque Brotherhood (2008)

Professional ratings
Review scores
Source	Rating
AllMusic	4/5 stars

Black Rain is the second album by Dark Lotus. It peaked at No. 3 on the Billboard Top Independent Albums chart and No. 71 on the Billboard 200.

== Track listing ==
No.	Title	Length
1.	"Under the Lotus"	2:22
2.	"Black Rain"	3:33
3.	"Ka-Boom!"	3:44
4.	"That's Me"	3:14
5.	"Consume Your Soul"	3:46
6.	"She Was"	4:25
7.	"Corrosion"	3:24
8.	"My First Time"	3:50
9.	"With the Lotus"	3:01
10.	"Hell House"	3:39
11.	"Jump Off"	4:14
12.	"The Walls"	4:31
13.	"Doornail Dorothy"	3:36
14.	"Pass the Axe"	3:12
15.	"Death Don't Want You"	5:33
Total length:		56:10

== Chart positions ==
- Billboard 200 – 71
- Independent Albums – 3
