= Breyer Wellington =

American professional wrestler

Personal information
- Born: September 9, 1978 (age 48) Dearborn Heights, Michigan, U.S.

Professional wrestling career
- Ring names: Breyer Wellington; Brian Smith; Richie Boy; "Broke Ass" Beryer Wellington
- Billed weight: 231 lb (105 kg)
- Trained by: Denny Kass
- Debut: November 22, 1995

Breyer Wellington (born September 9, 1978) is an American professional wrestler and promoter. He currently performs on the independent circuit, predominantly for Game Changer Wrestling (GCW) and Juggalo Championship Wrestling (JCW), where he was a two-time JCW Heavyweight Champion. Wellington is also the owner of the Livonia, Michigan-based independent professional wrestling promotion, Horror Slam Wrestling where he was a two-time Horror Slam Heavyweight Champion, a one-time Horror Slam Horrorcore Champion, and a one-time Horror Slam Tag Team Champion with Triple Rach. He has also competed in Xtreme Pro Wrestling (XPW), the World Wrestling Federation (WWF, now World Wrestling Entertainment (WWE)), and Total Nonstop Action Wrestling (TNA).

== Professional wrestling career ==
=== Independent circuit (1995–present) ===
On November 23, 1995, Breyer Wellington made his professional wrestling debut during a Border City Wrestling (BCW) show at the Hellenic Banquet Hall in Windsor, Ontario, Canada in which he teamed up with Pierre Francois against his trainer Denny Kass and Otis Apollo in a tag team match. Wellington also competed in several tag team matches on a BCW television taping on January 21, 1997, at the Colonel Bishop Community Centre in LaSalle, Ontario, Canada in which he teamed up with Steve Nixon against Brad Johnson and Kamikaze Keith and Denny Kass and Otis Apollo.

Wellington competed in his only Total Nonstop Action Wrestling (TNA) match on July 23, 2003, during a taping for the July 27, 2003 episode of Xplosion at the Tennessee State Fairgrounds in Nashville in which he teamed up with Chris Hero and The Soul Assassin against the 3 Live Kru (BG James, Konnan, and Ron Killings).

On December 12, 2004, Wellington teamed up with Corporal Robinson and Zach Gowen against the team of the Insane Clown Posse (Violent J and Shaggy 2 Dope) and the Rude Boy in a six-man tag team match during Border City Wrestling's A Night of Appreciation for Sabu charity show.

On September 1, 2021, Breyer Wellington's promotion, Horror Slam, held a joint show with the New Jersey-based national independent professional wrstling promotion Game Changer Wrestling (GCW) at the Knights of Columbus Hall in Detroit, Michigan and was also GCW's first ever show in the State of Michigan. Wellington also took part in the show himself and fought in a Detroit death match against former GCW Tag Team Champion Jimmy Lloyd.

On September 14, 2024, at GCW's Bad One pay-per-view at the Harpos Concert Theatre in Detroit, Wellington teamed up with 2 Tuff Tony and Mad Man Pondo against Thrunt (1 Called Manders, Dark Sheik, and Effy) in a six man tag team match with Violent J of Insane Clown Posse accompanied Wellington, Tony, and Pondo. Despite losing the match, Violent J would issue a challenge to GCW to a "2 day war" at the Gathering of the Juggalos the following year. However, despite the challenge, Wellington would not compete in the 2 Day War the following year.

On October 12, 2024, Wellington's Horror Slam promotion held its 7th anniversary show at the Elk's Lodge in Livonia, Michigan which featured talent from We Love Wrestling (WLW) and Juggalo Championship Wrestling (JCW). Wellington himself defended the Horror Slam Horrorcore Championship against Schwartzy.

On February 21, 2025, Wellington competed in a death match against Mickie Knuckles at Horror Slam and We Love Wrestling's (WLW) Motor City Massacre at the Elk's Lodge in Livonia, Michigan.

=== World Wrestling Federation / WWF (1997–1998) ===
On June 23, 1997, Breyer Wellington made his World Wrestling Federation (WWF) debut on the first Monday Night Raw/Shotgun Saturday Night taping in Detroit at Cobo Arena when he fought Rambo in a dark match. On June 29, 1998, during a Raw/Shotgun Saturday Night taping at the Gund Arena in Cleveland, Ohio, Wellington fought Rhino Richards. However, Wellington lost both of his only two WWF matches.

=== Juggalo Championship Wrestling (1999–present) ===
On December 19, 1999, Breyer Wellington made his Juggalo Championship Wrestling (JCW) debut during the promotion's debut show at St. Andrews Hall in Detroit, Michigan in which he competed in a battle royal to crown the inaugural JCW Heavyweight Champion. The show was later released released on VHS and DVD as JCW Volume 1 with commentary provied by Violent J and Shaggy 2 Dope of Insane Clown Posse, The Rude Boy, and Jamie Madrox of Twiztid.

On April 14, 2000, Wellington made his JCW singles match debut during the Strangle-Mania Live Tour at the Fillmore Auditorium in Denver, Colorado where he fought against a wrestler named Kenji. During the second night of the 2001 Gathering of the Juggalos at the Seagate Convention Centre in Toledo, Ohio, Wellington fought Shaggy 2 Dope of Insane Clown Posse in a singles match. During a live event on January 28, 2002, Wellington won the JCW Heavyweight Championship after he defeated Vampiro. However, he would only defend it once during the 2002 Gathering of the Juggalos at the Peoria Civic Center in Peoria, Illinois on July 20, 2002, in which he was defeated by Chris Candido.

On October 31, 2007, after the formation of the Juggalo World Order (JWO), JWO members Scott Hall and Corporal Robinson competed in a three on two handicap against Wellington, Conrad Kennedy III, and Joe Doering during the Hallowicked After Party at St. Andrews Hall in Detroit, Michigan.

During the premiere taping of JCW Lunacy on May 3, 2024, Wellington teamed up with James Ellsworth against the Redwood Giants (Hurtful Kurt and Painful Paul) on the September 4, 2024 episode before fighting off against Ellsworth himself on the September 11, 2024 episode. On the January 29, 2025 episode of Lunacy, Wellington competed in a fatal four-way match for the JCW Tag Team Championship in which he teamed up with Jeeves against JCW Tag Team Champions, the Backseat Boyz (Tommy Grayson and JP Grayson), the Brothers of Funstruction (Ruffo The Clown and Yabo The Clown), and The Neon Blondes (Dani Mo and Facade).

== Championships and accomplishments ==
- Juggalo Championship Wrestling
  - JCW Heavyweight Championship (2 times)
- Independent Wrestling Revolution
  - IWR Heavyweight Championship (1 time)
  - IWR King of the Indies Championship (1 time)
- Maximum Assault Wrestling
  - MAW Heavyweight Championship (1 time)
- Pro Wrestling All-Stars of Detroit
  - PWASD Tag Team Championship (5 times) – with N8 Mattson as Threat, Zach Main, and Frank Isaac Anderson as Dirty Money Incorporated
  - PWASD Heavyweight Champion (2 times)
- Horror Slam Wrestling
  - Horror Slam Horrorcore Championship (1 time)
  - Horror Slam Heavyweight Championship (2 times)
