= Marz (rapper) =

Croatian rapper and musician

- Born: Zlatko Bobby Hukic
- Genres: Hip hop; industrial
- Occupations: Rapper; singer; songwriter
- Instrument: Electric guitar
- Formerly of: Ministry; Dark Lotus

Marz, born Zlatko Bobby Hukic, also known as Bobby Marz, is a Croatian rapper and singer based in Chicago, Illinois, United States. He spent several years with Ministry before launching a solo career as a rapper. After touring with Insane Clown Posse and contributing to the band Dark Lotus, he set up his own record label, Billion Dollar Ballers.

== Early history ==
Marz was born in Croatia but grew up in Chicago. He began as a tech in a Chicago recording studio (Chicago Trax), where he worked for various acts, including Peter Gabriel and Ministry. Hukic met Ministry's Al Jourgensen in 1994 at the Chicago Trax recording studio where Hukic was interning while working on solo material, and Jourgensen recruited him to work on Ministry's record, Filth Pig, playing guitar and also acting as engineer.

He went on to become a full-time member, touring the world with the band. He stayed until Ministry's 1999 album, Dark Side of the Spoon, but left the band soon after it was recorded. He was later persuaded back to play on one last tour with the band. Hukic and Jourgensen remained on good terms, with Jourgensen even joining Marz on stage at a few performances.

Hukic produced a demo which won him a contract with E-Magine Records, with whom he released the album Lung Fu Mo She. The album was described by Drowned in Sound as a "toxic blend of industrial drumming and guitars mixed with his own bullet proof rhyming flow". According to Hukic, "The majority of the record is about self-empowerment." Tracks from this album were featured in a TV ad for the movie Catwoman, in MTV's The Real World, and included on MTV & WWF's Tough Enough 2 Soundtrack.

In 2000–2001, Hukic, with his band, comprising Hukic, Rey Washam (drums, programming, formerly of Ministry), Troy Gourley (bass guitar), Louis Svitek (guitar, also formerly of Ministry) and Pat De La Garza (guitar) performed two nationwide tours with Insane Clown Posse on the "Bizaar Bizzar Tour". Hukic was impressed by Insane Clown Posse's performance style, and the Juggalo fanbase embraced Marz.

Plans were made for Hukic to join the supergroup Dark Lotus and sign with Psychopathic Records. However, Marz was still signed with E Magion Records, but Hukic told Psychopathic that he could get out of his contract with his current label. Hukic recorded vocals for the Dark Lotus album Tales from the Lotus Pod, however most of the group were not as impressed with Hukic as Joseph Bruce had been.

Although Marz was featured on Psychopathic's 2001 sampler, he was ultimately never signed with the label, as he could not get out of his contract with E Magion Records. This ultimately led to a dispute between Insane Clown Posse and Marz. Marz recorded a diss track towards ICP, saying that he "was the Sixth Joker's Card". Tales from the Lotus Pod was reissued with Hukic's vocals removed as a result of this dispute.

Marz toured with Korn in 2002 after joining their record label, Elementree, to begin work on his second album, and performed on Korn's "Pop Sux" Tour. During this time, Marz recorded collaborations with Jonathan Davis and Swizz Beatz. Marz had a song on "Gorilla Pimpin" thanking the Juggalos. Jonathan Davis from Korn and ICP have been at odds since Violent J made statements to Davis about his childhood. Davis informed Marz he would have to cut the word "Juggalo" from the album. He refused and self-released the album, "Gorilla Pimpin'", which includes a song titled "Cut Throat" that featured Jonathan Davis. In 2004, Marz started his own record label, Billion Dollar Ballers Entertainment. He released TGZ Nation The Mixtape under this label.

Hukic has had Marz tracks included in several films including Life and Lyrics (2006 - "Whut It Do" and "Video Tape It") and It's a Boy Girl Thing (2006 - "Red Carpet Pimpin'").

== The Billion Dollar Baller Show ==
In 2006, Marz teamed up with Fearless Radio to launch his own radio show with B.D.B. labelmates Pack and DJ E.L.I.—The Billion Dollar Baller Show

== Marz Presents: Grind Music The Movement ==
In 2007, Marz released his 4th album, Marz Presents: Grind Music The Movement. This album contains collaborations with artists like Pack, Redbone & Chrissy Feliciano; Rope 30, Big EZ & Epidemik; Sawbuc; Chi-ILL; John Blu; Heata; and Trinity.

The first single on the album, "Nawww", features "Block CEOs", a Chicago group which Marz put together. Group members are Rope 30, Big EZ and Sonny Black of 108 Records, Chi-ILL and Henny B of Torture Chamber Records, and Marz and Pack of Billion Dollar Ballers. Block CEOs did a video for the song "Nawww".

== Discography ==
- Lung Fu Mo She LP (2000) E-Magine/Disco Kills
- Gorilla Pimpin LP (2003)
- TGZ Nation: The Mixtape(2004)
- Against All Odds LP (2005)
- Marz Presents Grind Music The Movement (2007)
- Grind Music 2.0 (2008)
- Marz Presents 99 Riches feat The Block Ceos (2008)
- Marz Presents Billion Dollar Ballers-Candy Days (2010)
- John "MARZ" Brown - Revelations (2012)

=== Featured In ===
- Ministry - Filth Pig (engineer, 1996)
- Ministry - Dark Side of the Spoon (electronics & guitar, 1999)
- Various Artists - Psychopathic Records 2001 Sampler (vocals, 2001)
- Dark Lotus - Tales from the Lotus Pod (vocals, 2001)
- Various Artists - WWF Tough Enough, Vol. 2 (vocals, 2002)
- Ministry - Sphinctour (guitar, 2002)
- Various Artists - Heavy Hittaz Mixtape (vocals in "Driven", 2004)
- Enhancer - Electrochoc (vocals in "La Pression", "Electrochoc" & "West Side De Paname", 2006)
- Song (Do What You Do) featured in Kia Soul ad with hamsters
