= Nathan Webb =

Nathan Webb may refer to:

- Nathan Webb (minister) (1705–1772), American Congregational Church minister
- Nathan Webb (Massachusetts legislator) (1767–1853), Boston Selectman; member of Massachusetts House of Representatives
- Nathan Webb (judge) (1825–1902), United States federal judge
- Nathan Webb (baseball) (born 1997), American baseball player
- Nathan Webb (footballer) (born 1998), English footballer
- Nate Webb (wrestler) (debuted 1999), independent professional wrestler
