= The Opaque Brotherhood =

Studio album by Dark Lotus
- Released: April 15, 2008
- Genre: Hip-hop
- Length: 57:12
- Label: Psychopathic Records
- Producer: Brian Kuma; Eric Davie; Dark Lotus

Dark Lotus chronology
Black Rain (2004)	The Opaque Brotherhood (2008)	The Mud, Water, Air & Blood (2014)

Professional ratings
Review scores
Source	Rating
AllRovi	4/5 stars

The Opaque Brotherhood is the third studio album by American hip-hop supergroup Dark Lotus. Released on April 15, 2008, it peaked at No. 4 on the Billboard Top Independent Albums chart, No. 45 on the Billboard 200, No. 45 on the Top Internet Albums chart and No. 23 on the Top R&B/Hip-Hop Albums chart. AllMusic reviewer Stewart Mason praised the album, writing "Nothing on The Opaque Brotherhood will convince anyone who isn't already a fan, but the tormented lyrics and matter-of-fact delivery remove a layer or two of distance and artifice from the band's familiar themes, and make them that much more disturbing as a result." A "Deluxe Edition" of the album was released in August 2008, adding four additional songs.

== Track listing ==
No.	Title	Length
1.	"Intro"	3:05
2.	"In Bloom"	3:08
3.	"Follow the Leader"	4:00
4.	"Black Sand"	3:19
5.	"Can You Keep a Secret"	4:04
6.	"Heinous"	3:57
7.	"Backwords"	3:45
8.	"Keep Up"	4:05
9.	"Witch Trapped in This Song"	3:58
10.	"Opaque Brotherhood"	3:54
11.	"Hot Poison"	3:55
12.	"Falling"	4:21
13.	"Trapped Inside"	4:33
14.	"Withered"	7:07
Total length:		57:05

Deluxe edition bonus tracks
No.	Title	Length
15.	"During an Eclipse"	3:50
16.	"Hallucinations"	3:16
17.	"Rejected"	4:15
18.	"The Wheel in the Sky"	3:52
Total length:		72:18
