= Violent J =

American rapper (born 1972)

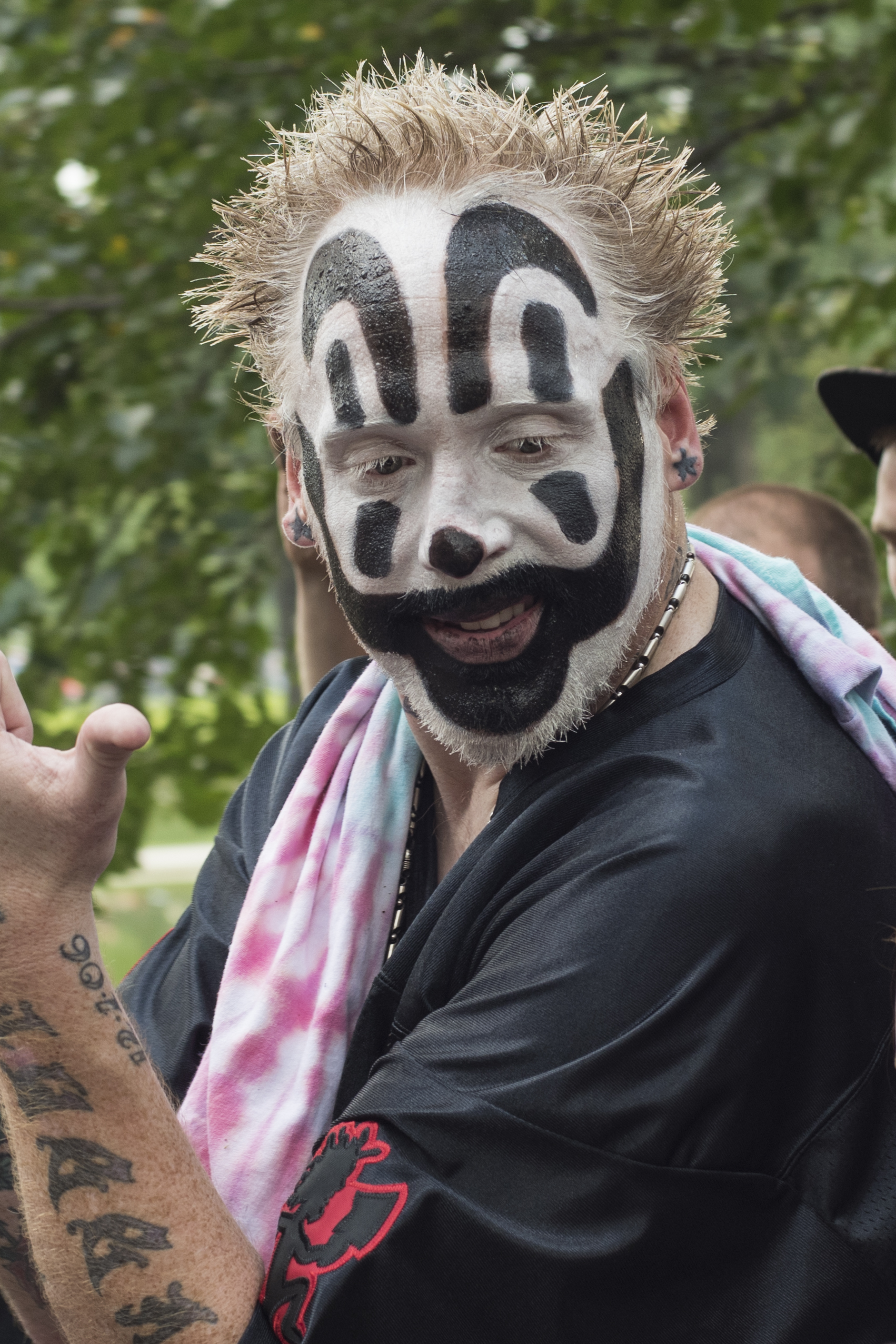
- Violent J in 2017

Background information
- Born: Joseph Frank Bruce; April 28, 1972 (age 54); Berkley, Michigan, U.S.
- Genres: Horrorcore; rap rock; hip hop
- Occupations: Producer; rapper; wrestler; actor
- Years active: 1989–present
- Label: Psychopathic
- Member of: Insane Clown Posse
- Website: insaneclownposse.com

Joseph Frank Bruce (born April 28, 1972), known by his stage name Violent J, is an American rapper, record producer, professional wrestler, actor, and part of the hip hop duo Insane Clown Posse (ICP). He is a co-founder of the record label Psychopathic Records, with fellow ICP rapper Shaggy 2 Dope (Joseph Utsler) and their former manager, Alex Abbiss. Also along with Utsler, Bruce is the co-founder of the professional wrestling promotion Juggalo Championship Wrestling.

== Early life ==
Bruce was born in Berkley, Michigan, as the last born of three children. His father, Richard Bruce, stole all of the family's money and left when Bruce was two years old. Joe's mother, Linda, was forced to care for him and his siblings, older brother Robert and younger sister Theresa, off the income she made as a janitor. At age seven, the brothers caught a butterfly, and both were fascinated by the vibrant colors and overall peacefulness of the creature. They kept the butterfly in a jar overnight, and intended to free it the following morning. When they awoke, the brothers found the butterfly had died, and felt as if they had committed a murder. The brothers made a vow that "one day, [they] will make it to heaven, so that [they] can [...] apologize to that butterfly face-to-face." On every Insane Clown Posse album and EP it reads "Dedicated to the Butterfly".

Bruce received all of his clothes from rummage sales, and his food from canned food drives held at his own school. After moving to Oak Park, Bruce met John Utsler, and his little brother Joey. He began his gang life by reluctantly getting involved in criminal activity in Royal Oak Township. Along with John and Joey, Bruce got heavily into rap music. In 1989, Bruce, as Jagged Joe, Joseph Utsler, as Kangol Joe, and John Utsler, as Master J, released the single titled "Party at the Top of the Hill" under the name of JJ Boys, but they did not pursue a serious career in music.

Bruce dropped out of school in ninth grade, and moved in with his friend, Rudy, in River Rouge. There he formed his own gang called Inner City Posse, which would terrorize people with Army-issued tear gas and steal car radios for money. One night, Joe's mother, who had just moved to Ferndale, had her house attacked by rival gang, Hazel Park Posse (HPP), from Hazel Park. Fearing for his mother's life, Joe fled to Bonnie Doone, North Carolina, a trailer park town just outside Fort Bragg, where his brother was staying with the U.S. Army. It was there that Bruce witnessed the open racism which would later emerge as the hate for bigots referenced in Insane Clown Posse's lyrics.

At seventeen, Joe returned to Ferndale. He was soon jailed, and the experience convinced him to get away from gang life. In 1989, after a short career in professional wrestling, Bruce and his friend Dale Miettinen Jr. recorded Intelligence and Violence on a karaoke machine, which marked the debut of Bruce's stage name Violent J. Joe bought his own karaoke machine and, along with Joey and John Utsler, formed the music group Inner City Posse, named after their gang. After the release of the album Bass-Ment Cuts, the group hired record store owner Alex Abbiss as their manager, and established the Psychopathic Records record label with him in 1991.

== Musical career ==
=== Solo career (1989–present) ===
In 1989, Bruce recorded his first solo release, Enter the Ghetto Zone, using two cassette players. One played the beat, while the other recorded, and Bruce stuck his head between the two and rapped. In 2003, Bruce released his second solo release Wizard of the Hood, which was an extended reference to the "Wizard of the Hood" songs which he recorded on Inner City Posse's Intelligence and Violence and Dog Beats, and Insane Clown Posse's Carnival of Carnage. In 2009, Bruce released the LP The Shining, which was initially given away for free at the 2008 Gathering of the Juggalos before being nationally released. During ICP's GOTJ 2013 seminar J and Shaggy stated that they were wanting to do solo albums. On December 10, 2015, with the release of Phantom: X-tra Spooky EP two flyers were released. One for Shaggy 2 Dope's new solo album titled F.T.F.O.M.F. said to be released in 2016. The other flyer was for Violent J's new solo album titled Karma Forest said to be released in 2016.

In 2023, Bruce collaborated on two tracks for the Saddle Up and Ride EP from alternative rock band The Lucid, composed of Sponge vocalist Vinnie Dombroski, guitarist Drew Fortier, former Megadeth bassist David Ellefson, and Raven drummer Mike Heller. Bruce appears on the title track as well as a cover of Faith No More's "Epic" retitled as "Sweet Toof" featuring new lyrics written by Bruce and Dombroski.

=== Insane Clown Posse (1989–present) ===
In late 1991, Inner City Posse changed their style, look, and name. Bruce recalled a dream of a clown running around in Delray, which became the inspiration for the group's new name: Insane Clown Posse. Upon returning home that night, Bruce had a dream in which spirits in a traveling carnival appeared to him—an image that would become the basis for the Dark Carnival mythology detailed in the group's Joker's Cards series. These stories each offer a specific lesson designed to change the "evil ways" of listeners before "the end consumes us all." Insane Clown Posse has a dedicated following, often referred to by the group as Juggalos and Juggalettes.

John Utsler left the group about a month before the release of Carnival of Carnage. Insane Clown Posse has since been composed of Joseph Bruce and Joseph Utsler, who perform under the respective personas of the murderous, wicked clowns Violent J and Shaggy 2 Dope. The duo performs a style of hardcore hip hop known as horrorcore, and is known for its dark, violent lyrics and elaborate live performances. Insane Clown Posse has earned two platinum and five gold albums. According to Nielsen SoundScan, the entire catalog of the group has sold 6.5 million units in the United States and Canada as of April 2007.

=== Golden Goldies (1995) ===
Golden Goldies was a comical group whose lyrics focused solely on gold. The group consisted of Psychopathic Record's employees and friends; Joseph Bruce (Golden Jelly), Joseph Utsler (Gold D), Robert Bruce (Golden Gram), Billy Bill (Gold Double B), Alex Abbiss (Gold Rocks), Mike E. Clark (Gold Digger), Rich Murrell (Golden Warrior), Frank Giammanco (Golden Frank), Keith Jex (Gold Teeth), Josh Silverstein (Rold Gold), Kelly Eubanks (Gold Spud), Dave Fink the East Side G (Golden Toby), and Matt Mackalantie (Gold Spakalantie). Their only LP, Gimme Them Fuckin' Nuggets Bitch, Or I'll Punch Your Fuckin' Face, was recorded in 1995 in a span of one week, and was not publicly released. Golden Goldies was a project put together by Insane Clown Posse for entertainment purposes only. To add more humor to the album, each artist was given only five minutes to write their verses, and had only one take to record them, which resulted in some artists messing up their lines, and lyrics containing "some very strange things." The group held only one live performance, which occurred at the record release party for Insane Clown Posse's Riddle Box.

=== Dark Lotus (1998–2017) ===
Formed in 1998, Dark Lotus consisted of Bruce and Utsler of Insane Clown Posse, Jamie Spaniolo and Paul Methric of Twiztid, and Chris Rouleau. Each member was said to "act as a 'petal' of the lotus," and it was announced that there would be six members. After switching between two different "sixth members", Marz, and Anybody Killa, Dark Lotus decided to keep the group to only five. On January 19, 2017, via an interview with Faygoluvers, Insane Clown Posse announced that the group disbanded.

=== Psychopathic Rydas (1999–2015) ===
Psychopathic Rydas formed in 1999, and consists of Psychopathic Records-associated rappers performing under alternate stage names in the style of mainstream gangsta rap. The group's current lineup consists of Bruce (Bullet), Utsler (Full Clip), Methric (Foe Foe), Spaniolo (Lil' Shank), Rouleau (Cell Block), Lowery (Sawed Off) and Hutto (Yung Dirt).

Psychopathic Rydas reuses the beats of popular rappers within the genre without paying to license the original songs or requesting permission from copyright owners to use the music, effectively making their albums bootlegs and resulting in the releases becoming difficult to find in some markets.

=== Soopa Villainz (2002–2005) ===
Formed in 2002, Soopa Villainz consisted of Detroit rappers L.A.V.E.L. (Mr. Heart), Bruce (Mr. Diamond), Esham (Mr. Spade) and Utsler (Mr. Club). The group made appearances on Insane Clown Posse's The Wraith: Shangri-La and Esham's Acid Rain and Repentance before releasing their debut album, Furious, in 2005. Following Esham and Lavel's departure from Psychopathic Records in October 2005, the group disbanded.

== Style and influences ==
Bruce has cited the artists Esham, N.W.A, Ice Cube, Awesome Dre, Geto Boys, Gong, Pearl Jam, and Michael Jackson as influences on his music. Allmusic reviewer James Monger has referred to Bruce's style as an "onslaught of Midwest Dirty Rap."

== Professional wrestling career ==
Violent J
Personal information
- Born: Joseph Bruce; April 28, 1972 (age 54) Berkley, Michigan U.S.
- Spouse: Michelle Rapp (m. 2013)
- Children: 2

Professional wrestling career
- Ring names: 3D; Corporal Darryl Daniels; Darryl Daniels; Diamond Donovan Douglas; Hector Hatchet; Violent J
- Billed height: 6 ft 3 in (191 cm)
- Billed weight: 280 lb (127 kg)
- Billed from: Detroit, Michigan; Happy Valley Insane Asylum (as Hector Hatchet)
- Trained by: Self-Trained; Al Costello; Denny Kass
- Debut: 1990

=== Early career (1983–1986) ===
Bruce began wrestling alongside his friends Joseph and John Utsler. The three got involved in backyard wrestling, and created two backyard wrestling rings for their made up promotion Tag Team Wrestling, later renamed National All-Star Wrestling. The trio staged National All-Star Wrestling's first show, NAW Wrestling Extravaganza, in front of friends and family. Among others, the show featured Bruce wrestling under the moniker Darryl "Dropkick" Daniels, and Joey Utsler wrestling as both Rhino, and the masked NAW World Champion White Tiger. Bruce stopped wrestling after becoming involved in gang life and forming Inner City Posse.

=== Independent circuit (1990, 1994–2004) ===
After being released from jail in 1990, Bruce decided to get away from gang life and start a career in professional wrestling. Bruce's friend, Rudy Hill, got him booked in a local wrestling promotion. Rudy had lied to the promoter by telling him that Bruce had been trained at the Chris Adams Wrestling School in Texas. At the event, Bruce met Rob Van Dam and Sabu, two other first-timers with whom he became very good friends. Bruce wrestled as Corporal Darryl Daniels, wearing a U.S. Army uniform that his brother had sent him while in the Gulf War, and had his first match against "Irish" Mickey Doyle at Azteca Hall in Southwest Detroit. Training alongside Rob Van Dam, Bruce went on to wrestle for Al Snow, including the event which featured the debut of Van Dam. After a short run in the business, Joe realized his dislike for the backstage politics, and decided to take up a career in music, taking the name Violent J.

Bruce returned to wrestling in the independent circuit in 1994, under the name Hector Hatchet. He competed for Midwest Championship Wrestling throughout the next year, wrestling in between recording sessions and touring. From 1996 to 1998, Bruce was involved in a rivalry with Sewer Dwella in Insane Championship Wrestling. He continued to compete in several independent promotions for the next three years, including IWA Mid-South and NWA Mid American Wrestling.

In 2001, Bruce appeared in Xtreme Pro Wrestling at XPW Rapture to aid Utsler. After Bruce suffered a real-life injury from a sloppy clothesline, the duo left the company. On October 5, 2002, he and Utsler wrestled in Ring of Honor and defeated Oman Tortuga and Diablo Santiago. Bruce was later made a playable character in both Eidos Interactive's video games Backyard Wrestling: Don't Try This at Home and Backyard Wrestling 2: There Goes the Neighborhood as Violent J. To help promote the games, he competed in a series of matches for Backyard Wrestling in 2003 and 2004.

=== Extreme Championship Wrestling (1997) ===
In August 1997, Bruce received a telephone call from friends Rob Van Dam and Sabu. They asked if he and Utsler could appear on Extreme Championship Wrestling (ECW)'s second pay-per-view (PPV) program, Hardcore Heaven. The duo went to Florida to discuss the ECW program's content with Van Dam, Sabu, and Paul Heyman. Heyman was pleased that Bruce and Utsler were former wrestlers, which meant that they could surprise the crowd by taking bumps. Heyman also favored the idea of using Insane Clown Posse, because it was unlikely that anyone knew of the relationship the group had with Van Dam and Sabu. Heyman presented his idea to Bruce and Utsler, who agreed to participate. Insane Clown Posse opened the ECW program by performing songs and exciting the crowd. Then Van Dam and Sabu, the main villains at the time, attacked Bruce and Utsler. The top fan favorite, The Sandman, came in and saved them by chasing away Van Dam and Sabu with his signature Singapore cane.

=== ICP's Strangle-Mania Live (1997) ===
Being avid wrestling fans, Bruce and Utsler owned, and were fascinated by, the death match wrestling collection Outrageously Violent Wrestling from Japan. The duo decided to create a compilation of their favorite matches, recording their own sports announcing under the personas named "Handsome" Harley Guestella "Gweedo" (Utsler) and Diamond Donovan Douglas "3D" (Bruce). The compilation video was released nationwide under the title ICP's Strangle-Mania. The video's success allowed Bruce and Utsler to host their own wrestling show, ICP's Strangle-Mania Live, to a sold-out performance at St. Andrew's Hall. The main event featured Insane Clown Posse versus The Chicken Boys, who were played by two friends of Bruce and Utsler. With local wrestling booker Dan Curtis, other wrestlers such as Mad Man Pondo, 2 Tuff Tony, Corporal Robinson, King Kong Bundy, and Abdullah the Butcher were also booked on the show to wrestle in the same death match style as shown in ICP Strangle-Mania.

=== World Wrestling Federation (1998) ===
In 1998, Insane Clown Posse were asked by the World Wrestling Federation (WWF) to perform the entrance theme for the wrestling group The Oddities. The WWF also wanted ICP to appear on their SummerSlam pay-per-view (PPV) program in August 1998 and rap live while The Oddities entered the ring. Once the duo arrived at the arena, they realized their wrestling dreams had come true; they had been contacted by wrestling's top company and were now set to appear on their PPV program at the company's most historic venue, Madison Square Garden. Bruce and Utsler were assigned to the locker room with Stone Cold Steve Austin and The Undertaker, who were to wrestle during the main event that night. The duo immediately felt the animosity of the locker room that had previously driven them away from wrestling. Insane Clown Posse performed and was asked to return for the live broadcast of Monday Night Raw the following night. At the broadcast, Bruce and Utsler requested for more than just a rapping role; they wanted to wrestle. Vince McMahon favored the idea and allowed them to participate.

Insane Clown Posse was put in a feud with The Headbangers. In the first wrestling match, The Headbangers were stiff, throwing real punches and kicks. In the rematch, a move was planned where The Headbangers would be flipped over by Bruce and Utsler. When the time came to flip over, however, The Headbangers refused to move, forcing Insane Clown Posse to genuinely flip them over and begin throwing punches. Realizing that the match was getting too heated, McMahon ended the feud after that match. Bruce and Utsler were put into other matches along with The Oddities. Vince Russo told Bruce and Utsler to "make it seem like you don't know anything about wrestling, and you guys keep choking and digging into their eyes". During this time, Bruce and Utsler had no contract with WWF. They, however, did have an agreement that the WWF would occasionally play Insane Clown Posse commercials, and in return, Bruce and Utsler would wrestle for free. Bruce and Utsler knew that airtime cost significantly more than any monetary compensation they would receive and were thus satisfied with the agreement. The duo were told they were to suddenly turn on The Oddities in their match against The Headbangers, then join them in beating up the group. They were also informed that their commercial would air the very next week, which had still not aired after three months of being involved with the WWF. The next week Insane Clown Posse and The Headbangers had a match with Steve Austin. Backstage, Austin made it clear to Bruce and Thrasher that Thrasher would receive the first Stone Cold Stunner, after which Bruce would turn around and receive the second. During the match, Austin gave Bruce the Stunner first, catching him off guard, thus having Bruce sell the move awkwardly. Although disappointed over the events during the match, Bruce and Utsler continued in hopes that McMahon would air the commercial as promised. Bruce and Utsler contacted Abbiss to inquire about the commercial and were informed that it was not aired. Given that McMahon failed to uphold his promise to air Insane Clown Posse's commercial, Abbiss recommended that Bruce and Utsler terminate their agreement with the WWF.

=== Hellfire Wrestling (1998) ===
While involved with the WWF, Insane Clown Posse brought Dan Curtis with them. After leaving the WWF, Curtis suggested that Insane Clown Posse start its own promotion while continuing with its music. He came to Bruce's house each night to discuss ideas about the promotion. Curtis convinced Bruce to coordinate another Strangle-Mania Live show, to be followed by an eighty-city "Hellfire Wrestling" tour. Curtis booked the talent and wrote the scripts. Strangle-Mania Live sold out the Majestic Theater in Detroit. Two days after the show, Curtis was found dead in his apartment, due to a sudden diabetic problem. The "Hellfire Wrestling" tour was subsequently canceled.

=== World Championship Wrestling (1999–2000) ===
Bruce went on to wrestle a long stint in World Championship Wrestling with Shaggy 2 Dope. The duo formed two stables. The first stable, The Dead Pool, consisted of Insane Clown Posse, Vampiro, and Raven; the second consisted of Insane Clown Posse, Vampiro, Great Muta, and Kiss Demon, known as The Dark Carnival.

On August 9, 1999, Insane Clown Posse made their WCW debut on Monday Nitro in a six-man tag team match. Insane Clown Posse and Vampiro defeated Lash LeRoux, Norman Smiley, and Prince Iaukea. At Road Wild 1999, Rey Mysterio Jr., Billy Kidman, and Eddie Guerrero defeated Vampiro and Insane Clown Posse. Insane Clown Posse continued to wrestle on Monday Nitro, defeating Public Enemy one week, and losing to Konnan and Rey Mysterio Jr. another. At Fall Brawl 1999, the tag team of Rey Mysterio, Eddie Guerrero, and Billy Kidman again defeated Vampiro and Insane Clown Posse. On September 13, Insane Clown Posse defeated Lenny Lane and Lodi.

On the August 23, 2000, episode of WCW Thunder, Great Muta, Vampiro, and Insane Clown Posse beat Tank Abbott and 3 Count. Five days later, on Monday Nitro, Insane Clown Posse and Vampiro defeated 3 Count, and the following week, Rey Mysterio, Jr. and Juventud Guerrera beat Insane Clown Posse. On September 25, Mike Awesome defeated Insane Clown Posse in a Handicap Hardcore match.

=== Juggalo Championship Wrestling (1999–2006) ===
On December 19, 1999, Bruce and Utsler created their own wrestling promotion, Juggalo Championshit Wrestling (now known as Juggalo Championship Wrestling). That night, the duo defeated the team of two Doink the Clowns to become the first ever JCW Tag Team Champions. The event was taped and released as JCW, Volume 1. Commentary was provided by Bruce and Utsler under their "3D" and "Gweedo" announcing personas. In 2000, Insane Clown Posse was involved in a rivalry with The Rainbow Coalition (Big Flam, Bob, and Neil). That April, the duo teamed with Vampiro to defeat The Rainbow Coalition. They defeated the Coalition again when they teamed with Evil Dead later that year, and the match that was featured on JCW, Volume 2.

In 2003, Insane Clown Posse defended, and retained, their JCW Tag Team Championships against Kid Cock (a parody of Kid Rock) and Feminem (a parody of Eminem). The match was featured on JCW, Volume 3. At the 2006 Gathering of the Juggalos, Bruce, Nosawa, and Vampiro lost to Mad Man Pondo and The Headhunters, but defeated Pondo and Powers of Pain the next day. Bruce continued to wrestle for JCW, which could only be seen at live events until the 2007 start of JCW SlamTV!.

=== Total Nonstop Action Wrestling (2004, 2006) ===
On January 21, 2004, Bruce appeared alongside Utsler on an episode of the weekly NWA Total Nonstop Action PPV. The duo were shown partying in the crowd alongside the Juggalos in attendance. In the main event of the night, which featured Jeff Jarrett going against El Leon, Jarrett and El Leon were fighting in the crowd when Insane Clown Posse sprayed Faygo in Jarrett's eyes. The following week, Insane Clown Posse were interviewed in the ring by Mike Tenay. The duo explained that they were fans of TNA, and that they wanted to be a part of the promotion themselves. As they started making kayfabe negative remarks toward Jarrett, Glenn Gilberti and David Young interrupted. When Gilberti tried to convince the duo to apologize to Jarrett, Insane Clown Posse chased Gilbertti and Young out of the ring before challenging the team to a match for the next week.

On February 4, Insane Clown Posse defeated Glen Gilbertti and David Young. Later that night, Scott Hudson interviewed Insane Clown Posse, and the duo announced that they would face whoever Jeff Jarrett threw at them next in a "Juggalo Street Fight". Insane Clown Posse won against the team of Glen Gilbertti and Kid Kash on February 18. Two weeks later, Insane Clown Posse announced that they would take part in a "Dark Carnival match" the next week against Glen Gilbertti and any partner he chooses. The following week, Insane Clown Posse and 2 Tuff Tony took on Glen Gilbertti, Kid Kash, and David Young. "The Alpha Male" Monty Brown made his TNA return, and cost Insane Clown Posse and 2 Tuff Tony the match. During their stint in TNA, Insane Clown Posse brought the company its largest paying crowds in history. After the duo left, they remained close with the company.

On March 17, 2006, Insane Clown Posse hosted and booked TNA's first ever house show, which took place in Detroit, Michigan. The duo defeated Team Canada members Eric Young and Petey Williams.

=== Return to the independent circuit (2004–present) ===
On December 12, 2004, Bruce and Utsler competed in the event A Night of Appreciation for Sabu, teaming with the Rude Boy to defeat the team of Corporal Robinson, Zach Gowen, and Breyer Wellington. Utsler received surgery on his neck the following year, forcing Bruce to compete as a singles competitor and as a member of the Hatchet Boys, alongside Corporal Robinson and 2 Tuff Tony.

In late 2006, Bruce was involved in a rivalry with Pro Wrestling Unplugged. On November 18, he turned on Corporal Robinson, the then JCW Heavyweight Champion and PWU Hardcore Champion, provoking a series of matches between JCW and PWU. At Pro Wrestling Unplugged's "PWU vs JCW", Team PWU (The Backseat Boyz and Corporal Robinson) defeated Team JCW (2 Tuff Tony, Violent J, and Dyson Pryce). The following month, Team PWU (Trent Acid, Corporal Robinson, Johnny Kashmere, Pete Hunter, and Gary Wolfe) took on Team JCW (Nosawa, 2 Tuff Tony, Violent J, Mad Man Pondo, and Raven) in a War Games match. Raven, however, attacked both teams, provoking all members of Team PWU and Team JCW to join forces and attack Raven.

Bruce continues to appear as Violent J at various promotions in the independent circuit.

=== Return to JCW (2007–2015) ===
In 2007, JCW launched SlamTV!. With it came the first broadcast of JCW since the three initial DVDs. Bruce returned to commentary as Diamond Donovan Douglas, and Utsler returned as "Handsome" Harley Guestella. 3D and Gweedo announced in an episode of SlamTV! that Insane Clown Posse had been stripped of the JCW Tag Team Championships due to them not defending the title. At the first annual Bloodymania, JCW's premier wrestling event, Insane Clown Posse teamed with Sabu to defeat Trent Acid and The Young Alter Boys w/ Annie Social the Nun.

Later that night, Corporal Robinson, Scott Hall, and Violent J formed the Juggalo World Order (JWO). Shaggy 2 Dope, Nosawa, Kevin Nash, 2 Tuff Tony, and Sid Vicious later joined the group. On January 26, 2008, Bruce and Tony won the JCW Tag Team Championship. However, their victory was declared void, stricken from the record, and the title was vacated. On November 9, 2008, the Juggalo World Order (Scott Hall, Shaggy 2 Dope, Violent J, 2 Tuff Tony, and Corporal Robinson) "invaded" Total Nonstop Action Wrestling's Turning Point PPV by purchasing front row tickets to the event. They proceeded to promote their faction by flashing their JWO jerseys, which each member had on, before being removed from the building.

At Bloodymania III, Juggalo World Order (Corporal Robinson, Scott Hall, Shaggy 2 Dope, Violent J, and Sid Vicious) defeated Trent Acid and the Alter Boys (Tim, Tom, Terry, and Todd). On February 10, 2011, Bruce took the on-screen role of commissioner of the company. During their GOTJ seminar on July 24, 2015, Violent J said he is hoping to wrestle again by next year but he wants to "get in a better space".

=== National Wrestling Alliance (2023) ===
In August 2023, Violent J returned to professional wrestling as a part of Billy Corgan's National Wrestling Alliance at the NWA 75th Anniversary Show. Violent J became the manager of the clown tag team, The Brothers of Funstruction, while beginning a rivalry with Vampiro, coming off their past history in WCW.

== Acting career ==
Bruce starred in the Psychopathic Records crime comedy Big Money Hustlas, as Big Baby Sweets, in 2000. A sequel, Big Money Rustlas followed in 2010, in which Bruce portrayed Big Baby Sweets' ancestor, Big Baby Chips. In 2001, Bruce was offered a role in the musical Prison Song, in which he was asked to play a bigoted prison guard. The producers offered Bruce the role on the basis of his appearances on The Howard Stern Show, and told him that they wanted "a big white dude with urban slang to his voice", and on the basis of his radio appearances, thought that Bruce was perfect for the role. While Bruce had interest in acting outside of Psychopathic Records projects, as well as being willing to act without face paint, he did not want to play a racist, and turned the role down. In preparation for Big Money Rustlas, Bruce starred in the film Death Racers in 2008. According to Bruce, "We just did it for fun. We knew it was gonna be basically garbage."

Bruce appears in the upcoming film Bunker Heights, written and directed by Drew Fortier; also appearing is Vinnie Dombroski, and David Ellefson, all of whom, including Fortier, Bruce collaborated with by way of their band The Lucid.

== Personal life ==
=== Family ===
Bruce's brother Robert, under the stage name Jumpsteady, has released two albums on Psychopathic Records (The Chaos Theory and Master of the Flying Guillotine) and was known as the "Psychopathic Records Don" from 1992 until he left in 2005 to become a paramedic; he regained the position when he returned in 2012. Bruce has one niece through Jumpsteady, named Samantha.

Bruce has two children with Michelle "Sugar Slam" Rapp: a son named Joseph "JJ" Bruce II, born in 2005, and a daughter named Ruby Bruce, born in 2006. Bruce and Rapp married on Father's Day, June 16, 2013. On the same day he released a single titled "Fuck My Dad (Richard Bruce)". In February 2016 Bruce and Sugar Slam mutually separated on good terms. Bruce has recorded tracks specifically for his children entitled "Song 4 Son" for his son and "Ruby Song" for his daughter.

In 2016 Bruce began dating artist Blahzay Roze, but they broke up later that year. On June 17, 2017, he released the music video for the 2013 Father's Day Single titled "Fuck My Dad (Richard Bruce)" and featured appearances from Lyte, Shaggy 2 Dope, Jumpsteady, their younger sister Denise, and Violent J's kids Ruby and JJ.

In support of his daughter's interest in the furry fandom, he declared himself "a juggalo furry" and attended Midwest Furfest with her in December 2018. During the convention, he sometimes dressed in a fursuit with sewn-in juggalo makeup made by "DraconicKnight".

=== Health ===
In 2021, Bruce announced that he was suffering from atrial fibrillation and subsequently announced ICP's farewell world tour taking place the following year. He assured that he will continue to play live when he is physically able.

=== Legal troubles ===
Bruce, along with his bandmate Joseph Utsler, has had numerous run-ins with the law, having been arrested multiple times starting at the age of 17:

- Bruce was jailed for ninety days in 1989–1990 for death threats, robbery, and violating probation; this experience convinced him to reduce his involvement in gang life.
- On November 16, 1997, Bruce was arrested on an aggravated battery charge after allegedly striking an audience member thirty times with his microphone at a concert in Albuquerque, New Mexico. Bruce was held for four hours before being released on US$5,000 bail.
- After a show in Indianapolis, Insane Clown Posse's tour bus stopped at a Waffle House in Greenfield, Indiana. When a customer began to harass Spaniolo and Bruce, a fight broke out between the customer and all of the bands' members. Months later on June 4, 1998, Bruce and Utsler pleaded guilty to misdemeanor disorderly conduct charges (reduced from battery) in an Indiana court and were fined US$200 each. Members of Twiztid, Myzery, and Psycho Realm were charged with battery.
- On June 15, 2001, Bruce was arrested in Columbia, Missouri for an outstanding warrant in St. Louis stemming from an incident in February 2001. That incident involved Insane Clown Posse allegedly attacking employees of a St. Louis radio station over disparaging remarks that a disc jockey made on the air. The police used several squad cars to detain Bruce, Utsler, and two associates a few miles from a venue where the group had completed a concert. Bruce was transferred to St. Louis the following day and released on bail without charge on June 18. On February 6, 2002, Bruce pleaded guilty to two counts of misdemeanor assault in the second degree and was sentenced to 12 months' unsupervised probation.

== Discography ==
=== Solo (1990–present) ===
- Wizard of the Hood EP (July 22, 2003) (Psychopathic Records)
- The Shining (April 28, 2009) (Psychopathic Records)
- Brother EP (E & J Tour - 01/03/2019-02/13/2019) (Psychopathic Records)
- Bloody Sunday (February 17, 2023) (Psychopathic Records)
- American Life/Lives (TBA) (Psychopathic Records)
- Walking Home (TBA) (Psychopathic Records)
- Karma Forest (TBA) (Psychopathic Records)

=== w/Insane Clown Posse (1991–present) ===
- Dog Beats (February 4, 1991) (Psychopathic Records)
- Carnival of Carnage (October 18, 1992) (Psychopathic Records)
- Beverly Kills 50187 (July 16, 1993) (Psychopathic Records)
- Ringmaster (January 28, 1994) (Psychopathic Records)
- Riddle Box (October 10, 1995) (Psychopathic Records)
- The Great Milenko (June 25, 1997) (Psychopathic Records)
- The Amazing Jeckel Brothers (May 25, 1999) (Psychopathic Records)
- Bizaar (October 31, 2000) (Psychopathic Records)
- Bizzar (October 31, 2000) (Psychopathic Records)
- The Wraith: Shangri-La (November 5, 2002) (Psychopathic Records)
- The Wraith: Hell's Pit (August 31, 2004) (Psychopathic Records)
- The Tempest (March 20, 2007) (Psychopathic Records)
- Bang! Pow! Boom! (September 1, 2009) (Psychopathic Records)
- The Mighty Death Pop! (August 14, 2012) (Psychopathic Records)
- The Marvelous Missing Link: Lost (April 28, 2015) (Psychopathic Records)
- The Marvelous Missing Link: Found (July 31, 2015) (Psychopathic Records)
- Fearless Fred Fury (February 15, 2019) (Psychopathic Records)
- Yum Yum Bedlam (October 31, 2021) (Psychopathic Records)
- The Naught (August 12, 2025) (Psychopathic Records)

=== w/Dark Lotus (1998–2017) ===
- Tales from the Lotus Pod (July 17, 2001) (Psychopathic Records)
- Black Rain (April 6, 2004) (Psychopathic Records)
- The Opaque Brotherhood (April 15, 2008) (Psychopathic Records)
- The Mud, Water, Air & Blood (July 29, 2014) (Psychopathic Records)

=== w/Psychopathic Rydas (1999–2017) ===
- Dumpin' (1999) (Joe & Joey Records)
- Ryden Dirtay (GOTJ 2001) (Joe & Joey Records)
- Check Your Shit In Bitch! (GOTJ 2004) (Joe & Joey Records)
- Duk Da Fuk Down (GOTJ 2007) (Joe & Joey Records)
- EatShitNDie (GOTJ 2011) (Joe & Joey Records)

=== w/Soopa Villainz (2002–2005; 2018–present) ===
- Furious (August 16, 2005) (Psychopathic Records)

=== w/The Killjoy Club (2013–2016; 2018) ===
- Reindeer Games (September 2, 2014) (Psychopathic Records)

=== w/3 Headed Monster (2023–present) ===
- Obliteration (June 1, 2023) (Psychopathic Records)
- Rampage (September 13, 2023) (Psychopathic Records)

== Group membership ==
- JJ Boys (1988–1989)
- Inner City Posse (1989–1991)
- Insane Clown Posse (1991–present)
- Golden Goldies (1995)
- Dark Lotus (1998–2017)
- Psychopathic Rydas (1999–2017)
- Soopa Villainz (2002–2005; 2018–present)
- The Bloody Brothers (2005; 2018–present)
- The Killjoy Club (2013–2016; 2018)
- The Loony Goons (2017–present)
- 3 Headed Monster (2023–present)

== Filmography ==
- Backstage Sluts (1998), as Violent J
- Backstage Pass (1999), as Violent J
- Big Money Hu$tla$ (2000), as Big Baby Sweets/Ape Boy
- Bowling Balls (2004), as J
- Death Racers (2008), as Violent J
- Aqua Teen Hunger Force (2010), as Violent J
- Big Money Ru$tla$ (2010), as Big Baby Chips
- 1000 Ways to Die (2011), as Violent J
- Bunker Heights (2026), as Joe

== Championships and accomplishments ==
- Juggalo Championship Wrestling
  - JCW Tag Team Championship – (3 times) with Shaggy 2 Dope (2, first) and 2 Tuff Tony (1)

== Bibliography ==
- Behind the Paint by Violent J with Hobey Echlin (2003) – Autobiography ISBN 0-9741846-0-8
