= Robert Bruce (rapper) =

American rapper and wrestler

- Also known as: Jumpsteady; Golden Gram
- Born: August 9, 1970 (age 55)
- Origin: Novi, Michigan, U.S.
- Genres: Hip hop
- Occupations: Rapper, wrestler
- Years active: 1992–2006, 2012–present
- Label: Psychopathic Records

Robert Bruce (born August 9, 1970) is an American retired rapper and professional wrestler who would go on to become a Don for Psychopathic Records.

Bruce is most commonly known by his stage name Jumpsteady. He is the older brother of Violent J of the Insane Clown Posse, and has been featured on many of their releases, both directly and indirectly, since his debut on their 1992 album Carnival of Carnage. Jumpsteady released the EP The Chaos Theory, and the LP Master of the Flying Guillotine before retiring from rapping in 2006. Bruce briefly returned to recording and performing in 2012 before retiring again shortly after.

== Early life ==
Robert Bruce was the second born of three children. His father, Richard Bruce, stole all the family's money and left when Bruce was young. Rob's mother, Linda, was forced to care for him and his siblings, Joe and Theresa, off the income she made as a janitor. One day as a kid, Rob and his brother caught a butterfly, and both were fascinated by the vibrant colors and overall peacefulness of the creature. They kept the butterfly in a jar overnight, and intended to free it the following morning. When they awoke, the brothers found the butterfly had died, and felt as if they had committed a murder. The brothers made a vow that "one day, [they] will make it to heaven, so that [they] can [...] apologize to that Butterfly face-to-face." The credits of every Insane Clown Posse album and EP include the message "Dedicated to the Butterfly" because of this vow. Bruce received all of his clothes from rummage sales, and his food from canned food drives held at his school.

When he became of age, Bruce signed up to join the United States Army and was stationed at Fort Bragg. Bruce was in the U.S. Army from 1988 to 1992. At home, Bruce's brother Joe had started a gang known as Inner City Posse. Rob sent him Army-issued tear gas for the gang to use. After a rival gang attacked his mother's house, Joe fled to Bonnie Doone, North Carolina, a trailer park town just outside Fort Bragg. It was there that both Rob and his brother witnessed the open racism which would later emerge as the hate for bigots referenced in their lyrics. Rob went on to fight in the Gulf War as part of the 1st Corps Support Command, better known as COSCOM. Upon returning home, Rob became very vocal against the actions which the government had taken in Desert Storm.

== Psychopathic Records ==
=== Psychopathic Records Don ===
Rob's brother formed a rap group, then known as Inner City Posse (later to be known as Insane Clown Posse), in 1990. As the group began recording music, they sent their tracks to Rob, who was stationed in Saudi Arabia at the time. Upon hearing the music, Rob recommended that the group hire his friend and record store owner Alex Abbiss as their manager. Following a meeting with the group, Abbiss established the Psychopathic Records record label with them in 1991.

After returning home, Rob began working behind the scenes at Psychopathic Records. In 2000, he was largely responsible for planning and putting together the first annual Gathering of the Juggalos. He continued to help organize the event every year until he left the label.

On September 11, 2000, Rob, N-Cubed, and Tall Jess formed the organization Dark Carnival Games, L.L.C. Under the organization, the three created and released the game "Morton's List: The End to Boredom" on July 13, 2001. Through the game, players are sent on "360 unique, real-life Quests that can be taken as far the player's are morally comfortable. At its simplest, it is an hour of totally random entertainment." Examples of quests include playing old childhood games, finding an old friend, trespassing, petty theft, and stealing a roommate's clothing while they are in the shower.

In 2004, Rob wrote and created the Pendulum's Promise Roleplaying Game, which uses the D20 system. It is based on an earlier version played at the first two Gathering of the Juggalos events. The storyline revolves around Insane Clown Posse's comic book series The Pendulum, as well as ideas from the Dark Carnival.

Rob also helped to create the board game "The Quest for Shangri-La", based on Insane Clown Posse's album The Wraith: Shangri-La. Released on February 16, 2007, the game pits 2-6 players against each other as they journey "through Detroit, the Nethervoid, and the Dark Carnival ... on an epic Quest to cross The Bridge to Shangri-La." The game features 36 playable characters, all based on Psychopathic Records artists and album, and ends in one of ten different scenarios. Shortly after the release, Rob quietly walked away from Psychopathic Records.

On September 24, 2012, it was announced that Rob Bruce returned to Psychopathic Records and reclaimed his position as a Don and co-owner of the label.

=== Musical career ===
==== Solo (1992–2006; 2012–present) ====
Bruce was included in Insane Clown Posse's debut album Carnival of Carnage in 1992. Taking the name Jumpsteady, he performed on the final track "Taste". He rapped about political and economical problems he had experienced first-hand, such as the government's lack of consideration of the problems facing the ghetto and their actions taken during Desert Storm. Soon after his appearance on the duo's next studio album Ringmaster, Jumpsteady took a leave from rapping.

In 1996 an ad for his debut EP The Chaos Theory was featured in Insane Clown Posse's EP Tunnel of Love. After another long absence, Jumpsteady released the EP on July 23, 2002, at that year's Gathering of the Juggalos. He went on to do several dates in 2002 with Insane Clown Posse on their "Diamonds Raining Pre Tour", with original interchangeable hype-men Tom Dub and PsychoPatrick. In 2003, Jumpsteady called on long-time friend and Gathering of the Juggalos co-worker Delusional to become his hype-man and their first shows took place on Esham's "Acid Rain" tour. That same year, Jumpsteady and Delusional took the stage and performed Jumpsteady's first full set at the Gathering of the Juggalos 2003. Jumpsteady and Delusional performed many spot dates and every Gathering of the Juggalos from 2003 to 2006.

He released his debut full-length album Master of the Flying Guillotine on February 22, 2005, which featured his brother Violent J, brother-in-law Myzery, and hype-man Delusional. That spring, Jumpsteady took part in the "Psychopathic All-Stars Tour" with Lavel and Delusional as his hype-men. His last performance occurred at the 2006 Gathering of the Juggalos. He later announced that he would be retiring from rapping and resigned as vice president of Psychopathic Records to pursue a lifelong personal dream of becoming a paramedic.

It was announced on September 14, 2012, that Jumpsteady had returned to Psychopathic Records for his business ethics and skill among other things, thus reaffirming him as a Don and co-owner of Psychopathic Records. He is even due to begin working on new music. However, there have been no promotions, leaks, posts, blogs, release dates, or even collaborations of any kind to hype the highly anticipated third release from Jumpsteady. Die-hard juggalos have expressed during his absence from Psychopathic that they are very interested and extremely excited to hear what's in store for Jumpsteady's music career. He is one of the three members in Psychopathic's new group, Legz Diamond & The Purple Gang (the other two being Legz Diamond and Sugar Slam), and released the debut album, '9 Pistolas' on March 19, 2013. At the GOTJ 2013, Jumpsteady said that he will try to have a new album by the 2014 GOTJ. On October 11, 2013, Jumpsteady released a spoken album (meaning there was no music), "The Road And Other True Stories" before retiring from music again to focus on being a Psychopathic Don.

On January 1, 2017, Jumpsteady was invited to participate in the Juggalo March on Washington. He accepted on January 2, 2017.

==== Golden Goldies (1995) ====
Golden Goldies was a comical group whose lyrics focused solely on gold. The group consisted of Psychopathic Record's employees and friends; Joseph Bruce (Golden Jelly), Shaggy 2 Dope (Gold D), Robert Bruce (Golden Gram), Billy Bill (Gold Double B), Alex Abbiss (Gold Rocks), Mike E. Clark (Gold Digger), Rich Murrell (Golden Warrior), Frank G (Golden Frank), Keith (Gold Teeth), Josh (Rold Gold), Kelly Eubanks (Gold Spud), Fink the East Side G (Golden Toby), and Matt Mackalantie (Gold Spakalantie). Their only LP, Gimme Them Fuckin' Nuggets Bitch, Or I'll Punch Your Fuckin' Face, was recorded in 1995 in a span of one week, and was not publicly released. Golden Goldies was a project put together by Insane Clown Posse for entertainment purposes only. To add more humor to the album, each artist was given only five minutes to write their verses, and had only one take to record them, which resulted in some artists messing up their lines, and lyrics containing "some very strange things." The group held only one live performance, which occurred at the gold record certification party for Insane Clown Posse's Riddle Box.

== Professional wrestling career ==
Evil Dead
Personal information
- Born: August 9, 1970 (age 55)

Professional wrestling career
- Ring name(s): Evil Dead; The Masked Negotiator
- Billed height: 6 ft 2 in (1.88 m)
- Billed weight: Unknown
- Billed from: Napp Cemetery
- Debut: December 19, 1999
- Retired: 2005

=== Origin ===
Evil Dead's gimmick originally appeared as an on-stage extra to Insane Clown Posse concerts. Dressed as a decaying zombie, he would stumble around in the background while Insane Clown Posse performed. Several times during the show he would fall down dead on the stage, including off speaker stacks, off stage props, and off the stage itself. The gimmick eventually became popular enough that he was asked to wrestle in JCW. While wrestling, Evil Dead makes minimal movements, but, because he is dead, he also doesn't feel pain.

=== Juggalo Championship Wrestling (1999–2005) ===
Evil Dead made his professional wrestling debut at Juggalo Championship Wrestling's first show on December 19, 1999. He was managed by Insane Clown Posse, and fought his first match against Red Neck Devil Without a Cause. Later that night Evil Dead won a Battle Royal to become the first JCW Heavyweight Championship. Both matches were released on Juggalo Championship Wrestling Volume 1 in 2000. He was later featured on Juggalo Championship Wrestling Volume 2, released in 2001, for his match with Insane Clown Posse against the Rainbow Coalition.

In 2003, Bruce made a one-time appearance as The Masked Negotiator, managing Kamala in his match against Tom Dubb. The match was featured on Juggalo Championship Wrestling Volume 3. Bruce continued to wrestle as Evil Dead, competing every year for JCW at the Gathering of the Juggalos, until he retired in 2005.

=== Retirement ===
Since his retirement as a rapper, Bruce has also retired the Evil Dead character. But he had never said that a return would be impossible. As stated by JCW: "Evil Dead's last JCW appearance was at the Gathering 2005 during the JCW vs TNA 3 Day War [...] He hasn't been seen or heard from since, but never count Evil Dead out, just respect that he's dead. So it's only natural that he spends a lot of time just chillin' at his home in the Napp Cemetery."

== Championships and accomplishments ==
- Juggalo Championship Wrestling
  - JCW Heavyweight Championship (1 time)

== Personal life ==
Bruce has a daughter with Nancy, sister of former Psychopathic Records rapper Myzery. Their daughter Samantha has made two songs, "Sammy Song" (from Chaos Theory) and "Battlefield" (from Master of the Flying Guillotine), and was featured on the hidden track on Insane Clown Posse's Forgotten Freshness Vol. 3 album. At the 2003 Gathering of the Juggalos, Bruce brought her onstage to perform "Sammy Song" with him.

Bruce appears as Evil Dead, a playable character in Eidos Interactive's video game Backyard Wrestling: Don't Try This at Home.

He also has a younger sister, and a younger brother, Violent J.

His longtime girlfriend and creative collaborator is artist Rachel Paul, known as the creator of The Dark Carnival Tarot and other Juggalo-themed artwork.

== Discography ==
=== Solo ===
- The Chaos Theory EP (July 23, 2002)
- Master of the Flying Guillotine (February 22, 2005)

=== Spoken Word Albums ===
- The Road And Other True Stories (October 11, 2013)

=== With Golden Goldies ===
- Gimme Them Fuckin' Nuggets Bitch, Or I'll Punch Your Fuckin' Face (1995)

=== With Legz Diamond & The Purple Gang ===
- 9 Pistolas (2013)

=== Appearances on albums by other artists ===
- Insane Clown Posse: Carnival of Carnage (1992)
- Insane Clown Posse: Ringmaster (1994)
- Violent J: Wizard of the Hood (2003)
- Insane Clown Posse: The Wraith: Shangri-La (2002)
- Delusional: The Preparation (2006)
- Durty White Boyz: Unoriginal & Lyrically Offensive: The Mixtape – Hosted by Delusional & Monoxide of Twiztid (2008)
- Insane Clown Posse: Bang! Pow! Boom! (2009)
- Insane Clown Posse: Smothered, Covered, & Chunked (2012)

=== Appearances on albums by multiple artists ===
- Forgotten Freshness Volume 3 (2001)
- Hatchet History: Ten Years of Terror (2002)
- Psychopathics from Outer Space 2 (2003)

== Writing career ==
- Morton's List: The End to Boredom (2001) with Nathan Andren and R. Jesse Deneaux
- Pendulum's Promise: A Roleplaying Game for Juggalos (2003)
- The Quest For Shangri-La" A Boardgame (2007)
- Into The Echoside – Deckbuilding Game (2016)

== Filmography ==
- Big Money Hustlas (2000) – Hack Benjamin/Preacherman/Multiple Background Characters
- Big Money Rustlas (2010) – Hack Benjamin
