= Glass City Center =

Building in Ohio, United States

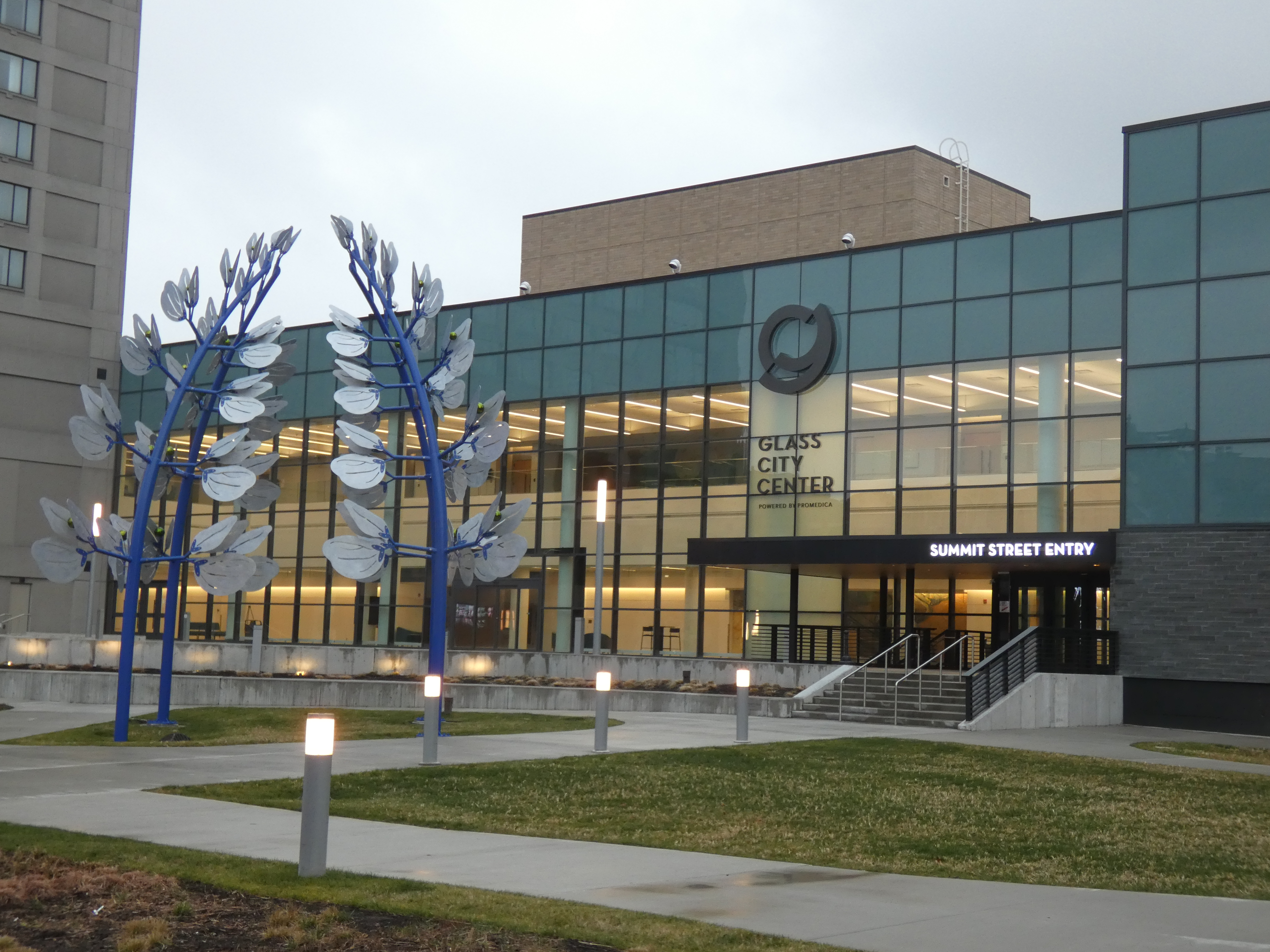
- The Glass City Center in 2022 after renovations
- Interactive map of Glass City Center
- Former names: SeaGate Convention Centre (1987-2022)
- Address: 401 Jefferson Avenue
- Location: Toledo, Ohio, U.S.
- Coordinates: 41.649276°N 83.536668°W

Construction
- Opened: March 27, 1987
- Renovated: 2022

Website
- Glass City Center

The Glass City Center is a performing arts and convention center located in downtown Toledo, Ohio. Opened on March 27, 1987, as the SeaGate Convention Centre, the center's exhibit hall measures 74,520 square feet (207 feet by 360 feet) of space and seats up to 5,100 for a banquet, 9,000 for a meeting, and 4,000 in a classroom configuration. It can be divided into three smaller halls, and when used for concerts with a 60 foot by 40 foot stage, can seat 2,000 (in one of the smaller halls), 3,000 (in two of the smaller halls), or 5,900 (in the entire hall) for concerts, stage shows, and other shows, this so that there are no bad seats in the house. Many of those seats used for concerts are in telescopic risers; there are 18 telescopic units at the arena, set up in sections of six; as a result, there are six sections of riser seating and a total of 3,216 in the risers (536 per section). The center also features 17,552 square feet (1,631 m^{2}) of meeting space.

The Park Inn by Radisson hotel attached to the center closed permanently in April 2020. In July, Lucas County Commissioners announced the structure would be renovated to house a 216-room Hilton Garden Inn and 93-room Homewood Suites. They also announced the demolition of the adjacent SeaGate Hotel which has been vacant since 2009.

In February 2022, it was announced that the SeaGate Centre would be renamed as the Glass City Center as part of their renovations to the facility. It features a new, 16,000-square-foot ballroom, along with a redesigned exterior and interior of the building.

== Notable events ==
- Gathering of the Juggalos 2001 (July 13–15, 2001)
- Mid-American Conference men's basketball tournament (1996–1999, annually)
- Toledo Ice (ABA) (partial 2005–2006 season)
- Glass City Rollers (WFTDA) (current tenant)
- Jehovah's Witnesses convention (2005–present)
- Toledo Auto Show
- Toledo Jeep Fest (2016–present)
