= Dark Lotus =

American hip-hop group

- Origin: Detroit, Michigan, United States
- Genre: Hip-hop
- Years active: 1998–2017
- Label: Psychopathic
- Spinoff of: Insane Clown Posse, Twiztid
- Past members: Violent J Shaggy 2 Dope; Jamie Madrox; Monoxide Child; Myzery; Esham; Blaze Ya Dead Homie; Vampiro; Marz; Anybody Killa

Dark Lotus was an American hip-hop supergroup based in Detroit, Michigan, United States. The group was formed in 1998 as a side project of Psychopathic Records artists. From 1998 to 2017, Dark Lotus' lineup changed multiple times, with the most consistent members of the group being Violent J, Shaggy 2 Dope, Jamie Madrox, Monoxide, and Blaze Ya Dead Homie.

== History ==
Initially in 1998, Dark Lotus was announced as a supergroup of artists that were signed to Psychopathic Records. In addition to the official hotline, it was also publicly announced in an exclusive interview with Alternative Press. The original members were Insane Clown Posse (Shaggy 2 Dope and Violent J), Twiztid (Jamie Madrox and Monoxide Child), and Myzery. The idea stemmed from the five artists recording the collaboration song "Meat Cleaver" on Twiztid's 1998 debut album Mostasteless. After Myzery distanced himself from Psychopathic Records, the remaining four members made its official Dark Lotus debut with the single "Echoside". The song was originally intended for the group's debut album, but was instead released on Insane Clown Posse's 1999 album The Amazing Jeckel Brothers because the Dark Lotus album's production took longer than expected.

The group attempted to add Esham as the official fifth member, with various interviews confirming his inclusion. In the demo version of the song "Whut?" from Insane Clown Posse's album Bizaar, Esham mentioned in the lyrics joining the supergroup; however, he was replaced by Twiztid in the final version, and ultimately had not stayed in the group. It was then announced that Blaze Ya Dead Homie would become the official fifth member of Dark Lotus. It was later announced that each member "would act as a 'petal' of the lotus", and that there would be six members. Another attempt at a new member came about with professional wrestler Vampiro. Both Blaze Ya Dead Homie and Vampiro appeared on the track "Maniac Killa" off of Twiztid's second album Freek Show, along with Insane Clown Posse. The track was credited to Dark Lotus. The following year, it was announced that Marz would be a member, thus replacing Vampiro, and cementing himself as the sixth member.

Dark Lotus released their first album, Tales From the Lotus Pod, in 2001. Mike E. Clark was brought in to produce the album, but left the project after producing four songs. Twiztid, Fritz the Cat, and Mike P of Zug Izland finished the remainder of the album. The album peaked at #1 on the Billboard Heatseekers chart, #6 on the Top Independent Albums chart, and #158 on the Billboard 200. Later in the year, Marz left the group, and was replaced by Anybody Killa.

In 2002, Tales From the Lotus Pod was reissued in a new version removing Marz's vocals. On April 6, 2004, Dark Lotus released their second studio album, Black Rain. It peaked at #3 on the Top Independent Albums chart, and at #71 on the Billboard 200. In the ensuing years, various Dark Lotus non-album tracks appeared on other Psychopathic Records releases, such as the Psychopathics From Outer Space and Cryptic Collection compilations.

Afterwards, Anybody Killa left the group, and a third album, The Opaque Brotherhood, was released without him on April 15, 2008. It peaked at #4 on the Top Independent Albums chart, #23 on the Top R&B/Hip-Hop Albums chart, #45 on the Top Internet Albums chart, and #45 on the Billboard 200. Allrovi reviewer Stewart Mason praised the album, writing "Nothing on The Opaque Brotherhood will convince anyone who isn't already a fan, but the tormented lyrics and matter-of-fact delivery remove a layer or two of distance and artifice from the band's familiar themes, and make them that much more disturbing as a result." Twiztid left Psychopathic Records on December 13, 2012, but according to Violent J, Dark Lotus had not broken up and would continue to release music on Psychopathic Records as time permitted.

It was announced on February 18, 2014 that all five members of Dark Lotus were in the studio together recording a new album. This would have been the group's first album since 2008's The Opaque Brotherhood. It was released at the 15th annual Gathering of the Juggalos, entitled The Mud, Water, Air & Blood. The album peaked at #43 on the Billboard 200, the group's highest number to date. Former member Anybody Killa was a guest feature on the track "Villainous", thus bringing the six artists together again.

At the 2016 Gathering of the Juggalos, during Insane Clown Posse's seminar, it was announced that Dark Lotus would perform Tales From the Lotus Pod in its entirety at the 2017 Juggalo Day Show. On January 19, 2017 via an interview with Faygoluvers, Insane Clown Posse announced that it was cutting ties with Twiztid and Majik Ninja Entertainment, and that all artists from Majik Ninja Entertainment were removed from the 2017 Juggalo Day Show and that a new lineup would be announced soon.

On July 21, 2018 at the 2018 Gathering of the Juggalos, Violent J announced at the Insane Clown Posse seminar that "We will never reunite with Twiztid. Ever." They also stated that Dark Lotus would not continue and that there would not be any disses towards them. These statements, along with various other factors involving both Insane Clown Posse and Twiztid, confirmed the end of the supergroup.

Afterwards, Twiztid, Blaze Ya Dead Homie, and Anybody Killa occasionally performed their verses from popular Dark Lotus songs during live performances, usually referring to themselves simply as "Lotus" or "D4L". In 2026, Twiztid, Blaze Ya Dead Homie, and Anybody Killa released the album Return of the Lotus under the group name Certified Psychos. It was promoted and sometimes billed as a continuation of Dark Lotus, which garnered a mixed response due to the absence of Insane Clown Posse. All four members had previously collaborated together in 2021 for the album Pact of the 4, albeit under the name Eastside Ninjas.

== Music and lyrics ==
Kimberly Chun of the San Francisco Chronicle described Dark Lotus' musical style as a mixture of "dub, goth, metal, shock rock and hip-hop, with a WWF announcer's delivery and shuffling stoner beats thrown in for good measure." Much of Dark Lotus' lyrics revolve around the occult.

== Members ==
- Violent J (1998–2017)
- Shaggy 2 Dope (1998–2017)
- Jamie Madrox (1998–2017)
- Monoxide Child (1998–2017)
- Myzery (1998–1999)
- Esham (2000)
- Blaze Ya Dead Homie (2000–2017)
- Vampiro (2000–2001)
- Marz (2001)
- Anybody Killa (2001–2006)

== Discography ==
=== Studio albums ===
List of studio albums, with selected chart positions
Title	Album details	Peak chart positions					
Title	Album details	US	US HH	US Rap	US Indie	US Heat.	US Taste
Tales from the Lotus Pod	Released: July 17, 2001; Label: Psychopathic Records	158	—	—	6	1	—
Black Rain	Released: April 6, 2004; Label: Psychopathic Records	71	—	—	3	—	—
The Opaque Brotherhood	Released: April 15, 2008; Label: Psychopathic Records	45	23	7	4	—	15
The Mud, Water, Air & Blood	Released: July 29, 2014; Label: Psychopathic Records	43	8	4	4	—	—
"—" denotes releases that did not chart, or was not released in that country.
