= The Continuous Evilution of Life's ?'s =

Studio album by Twiztid
- Released: January 27, 2017
- Recorded: 2015–2016
- Studio: The Dojo (Michigan)
- Length: 47:04
- Labels: Majik Ninja Entertainment; MNE 039
- Producers: Seven; Davey Suicide; Needlz; Skull Seagal; Afro Keys

Twiztid chronology
| The Darkness (2015) | The Continuous Evilution of Life's ?'s (2017) | Generation Nightmare (2019) |

Singles from The Continuous Evilution of Life's ?'s
- 1. "Psychomania" Released: March 23, 2016; 2. "Are You Insane Like Me?" Released: August 19, 2016; 3. "Nothing to You" Released: October 24, 2016; 4. "Kill Somebody" Released: November 25, 2016; 5. "Dead & Gone" Released: January 19, 2017; 6. "Come On Lets Get High" Released: April 20, 2017; 7. "Black Clouds" Released: June 2017

The Continuous Evilution of Life's ?'s (pronounced "The Continuous Evilution of Life's Questions") is the eleventh studio album by American hip hop duo Twiztid. It was released on January 27, 2017, through Majik Ninja Entertainment with distribution via INgrooves. Recording sessions took place at the Dojo in Michigan. Production was handled by Michael "Seven" Summers, Needlz, Davey Suicide, Skull Seagal and Afro Keys. It features guest appearances from Boondox, Blaze Ya Dead Homie, G-Mo Skee, Lex "The Hex" Master and The R.O.C.

== Background ==
First word of the album was announced on March 24, 2016, in the VIP single, that the album would be titled The Continuous Evilution of Life's ?'s. During Twiztid's Canadian Juggalo Invasion Tour, the first single "Psychomania" was released as the VIP single. In an interview a short time later Monoxide Child stated that the album would be out before the Gathering of the Juggalos 2016. In an interview in mid-2016, it was announced that the official release date for the album would be inside the re-release of The Green Book on August 19, 2016. On August 18, 2016, it was announced that the album would be available for pre-order on November 25, 2016, and available for purchase on January 27, 2017. Also in the vinyl release of the re-release was a card one could use to listen to the single "Are You Insane Like Me?". On August 24, 2016, Huffington Post did an article about the upcoming album. It was stated by Jamie Madrox that they had turned to Seven and the frontman for Davey Suicide to produce the album.

== Promotion ==
=== Singles and music videos ===
The first single from the album, "Psychomania" (without guest verses), was released as an exclusive VIP single during Canadian Juggalo Invasion Tour (March 23, 2016 – April 8, 2016). The song "Are You Insane Like Me?" was released as the second single on August 19, 2016. The third single, "Nothing to You", was released on the MNE Fall Sampler 2016, available by VIP on Twiztid's then-upcoming Spooktacular Horror Show Tour.

On November 17, 2016, it was announced that there would be three release parties for the album on January 27, 2017; the first took place at "Whiskey A-Go Go" in Hollywood, California and featured performances from Gorilla Voltage, G-Mo Skee and Twiztid. The second was held at The Roxy in Denver, Colorado and featured performances from Young Wicked and Boondox. The third took place at The Palladium in Worcester, Massachusetts and featured performances from Lex "The Hex" Master, The R.O.C. and Blaze Ya Dead Homie. On November 24, 2016, it was announced that in the packaging for the album would be 1 of 10 "ninja stars" to collect. The ninja stars will feature (Jamie Madrox, Monoxide Child, Blaze Ya Dead Homie, The R.O.C., Lex "The Hex" Master, G-Mo Skee, Boondox, Twiztid, Zodiac MPrint, House of Krazees).

Pre-orders and track list were revealed on November 25, 2016, with the song "Kill Somebody" available as a free download. On December 25, 2016, it was announced that for those who bought a VIP or the release party would receive an invitation to an undisclosed location for a free CD listening party. On January 13, 2017, the music video for "Kill Somebody" was released.

The fourth single, "Dead & Gone", was released via HipHopDX.com on January 19, 2017, and its music video was released on August 2, 2017.

=== Tour ===
In March 2017, Twiztid announced that they would go on tour to support the album titled Psychomania Tour. The tour ran from May 11, 2017, through June 11, 2017, and featured performances from Twiztid, G-Mo Skee, Young Wicked, Gorilla Voltage and Body Bag Syndicate.

=== Trivia ===
At the end of the song "That's Why They Hate Us More Than You'll Ever Know", Twiztid added the end to the song "How Does It Feel?"; the latter was featured on their debut album Mostasteless in 1998.

== Track listing ==
| No. | Title | Producer(s) | Length |
|---|---|---|---|
| 1. | "Barely Surviving (Ride or Die)" | Seven | 4:29 |
| 2. | "Are You Insane Like Me?" | Needlz; Davey Suicide | 3:23 |
| 3. | "Kill Somebody" | Seven | 5:20 |
| 4. | "Dead and Gone (Unh-Stop)" | Seven | 3:26 |
| 5. | "Black Clouds" | Seven | 3:12 |
| 6. | "I Got These Feelings" | Skull Seagal; AJAX (add.) | 2:56 |
| 7. | "Nothing to You" | Needlz; Davey Suicide | 5:26 |
| 8. | "Come On Let's Get High" | Afro Keys | 5:00 |
| 9. | "1k Hells 2 Find My Heaven" | Seven | 3:48 |
| 10. | "That's Why They All Hate Us More Than You'll Ever Know" | Seven | 6:14 |
| 11. | "Psychomania" (featuring Blaze Ya Dead Homie, The R.O.C., Lex "The Hex" Master, G-Mo Skee & Boondox) | Seven | 4:59 |
| 12. | "Long Road Home" | Needlz; Davey Suicide | 4:07 |
| Total length: | | | 47:04 |

== Personnel ==
- James "Madrox" Spaniolo – main performer
- Paul "Monoxide" Methric – main performer
- Chris Rouleau – vocals (track 11), additional vocals
- David Hutto – vocals (track 11)
- Jaron Johnson – vocals (track 11)
- Bryan Jones – vocals (track 11)
- Lex "The Hex" Master – vocals (track 11)
- Drayven Davidson – live drums (tracks: 1, 2)
- Lee Gresh – scratches (tracks: 1, 5)
- Michael "Seven" Summers – producer (tracks: 1, 3–5, 9–11)
- Davey Suicide – producer (tracks: 2, 7, 12)
- Needlz – producer (tracks: 2, 7, 12)
- Skull Seagal – producer (track 6)
- Afro Keys – producer (track 8)
- AJAX – additional producer (track 6)
- Fritz "The Cat" Van Kosky – recording and engineering
- Robert Rebeck – mixing
- Neil Simpson – mastering
- Eric Shetler – design
- Eric "E-Wolf" Wheeler – photography
- Josh Ulrich – photography
- George Vhalakis – management

== Charts ==
| Chart (2017) | Peak position |
|---|---|
| US Billboard 200 | 28 |
| US Top R&B/Hip-Hop Albums (Billboard) | 13 |
| US Top Rap Albums (Billboard) | 8 |
| US Top Album Sales (Billboard) | 11 |
| US Vinyl Albums (Billboard) | 16 |
| US Independent Albums (Billboard) | 3 |
| US Indie Store Album Sales (Billboard) | 15 |
