= Unlikely Prescription =

Studio album by Twiztid
- Released: September 10, 2021
- Recorded: 2020–2021
- Studio: The Dojo
- Genre: Hard rock
- Length: 49:03
- Label: Majik Ninja Entertainment
- Producers: A Danger Within, Drayven Davidson, Johnny Andrews, Johnny Sustar, ScatteredBrains, Seven, Tom Hane, Walter Dicristina, Zach Jones

Twiztid chronology
Revelashen (2020)	Unlikely Prescription (2021)	Glyph (2022)

Singles from Unlikely Prescription
- 1. "Rose Petal" Released: September 25, 2020; 2. "Perfect Problem" Released: November 13, 2020; 3. "Corkscrew" Released: February 5, 2021; 4. "Envy" Released: May 28, 2021; 5. "Neon Vamp" Released: July 15, 2021; 6. "No Change" Released: August 13, 2021

Unlikely Prescription is the fifteenth studio album by Twiztid. Released on September 10, 2021, the album marked a stylistic change in the duo's music. Previously, Twiztid had performed mainly rap with only certain rock elements thrown in (such as horrorcore); however, on Unlikely Prescription, they ventured into a purely rock-oriented direction. The album featured rock and metal guests such as Spencer Charnas (Ice Nine Kills), Dani Filth (Cradle of Filth), Rich Ward (Fozzy), and Matt Brandyberry (From Ashes to New).

== Background ==
In 2020, Twiztid had released two albums in the same year, April's Mad Season and November's Revelashen. Both albums intentionally received little promotion, with the former being released on the same day that it was announced. For Unlikely Prescription, Twiztid announced the album nearly a year prior to its release. In addition, the duo wanted the album to be a rock album instead of a predominantly rap album. Rock music had appeared before on Twiztid's albums, but only as a supplement to the mainly rap tracks (such as 2000's Freek Show and 2005's Mutant (Vol. 2)).

== Content ==
Twiztid was influenced by various rock and metal artists, such as Rob Zombie, Godsmack, Linkin Park, among others. They also performed at the 2018 and 2019 iterations of Van's Warped Tour, a predominantly rock music festival, in which the atmosphere gave the duo more encouragement to approach the rock genre. As such, the songs on Unlikely Prescription are more rock in nature. Spencer Charnas (Ice Nine Kills), Dani Filth (Cradle of Filth), Rich Ward (Fozzy), and Matt Brandyberry (From Ashes to New) were all featured guests on the album; their respective songs were released as digital singles prior to the album's release. Twiztid also removed their makeup in promotion of Unlikely Prescription.

== Commercial performance ==
Prior to the album's release, the songs "Rose Petal" and "Envy" were released as singles. Both singles charted on the Billboard Mainstream Rock chart, and both also peaked at the same position of No. 32. Although Twiztid had appeared on numerous album charts in the past, the two singles were the first time that the duo had appeared on a singles chart.

Unlikely Prescription was released on September 10, 2021. It peaked at No. 16 on the Billboard Top Album Sales chart and, because of the duo's venture into the rock genre, at No. 20 on the Billboard Top Hard Rock Albums chart, which was their first appearance on the chart. It also peaked at No. 14 on the Billboard Top Current Album Sales chart as well; however, similar to 2020's Revelashen, the album failed to appear on Billboard′s Top Independent Albums or Billboard 200 charts (which every album prior to Revelashen had done so on one or the other).

== Track listing ==
No.	Title	Producer(s)	Length
1.	"Corkscrew"	A Danger Within	2:36
2.	"Twist & Shatter"	Tom Hane	2:54
3.	"Broken Heart"	Drayven Davidson & Walter Dicristina	2:50
4.	"Confused"	A Danger Within	3:55
5.	"Neon Vamp" (feat. Dani Filth)	A Danger Within	3:08
6.	"Comes with an Apology"	Zach Jones	3:48
7.	"Rose Petal"	Johnny Sustar	3:31
8.	"Dead Instead"	Drayven Davidson & Walter Dicristina	2:55
9.	"Parasite"	Drayven Davidson & Walter Dicristina	2:52
10.	"Perfect Problem"	ScatteredBrains	3:44
11.	"If I Get Things Right"	Drayven Davidson & Walter Dicristina	2:23
12.	"More Than a Memory"	Zach Jones	3:49
13.	"Envy" (feat. Spencer Charnas)	Johnny Andrews	3:57
14.	"No Change" (feat. Matt Brandyberry)	Seven	3:31
15.	"World of Pretend"	Drayven Davidson & Walter Dicristina	3:04

== Personnel ==
- Jamie Madrox – vocals
- Monoxide – vocals
- Eric "Drayven" Davidson – drums

== Charts ==
Chart (2021)	Peak position
US Top Album Sales (Billboard)	16
US Top Hard Rock Albums (Billboard)	20
