= Generation Nightmare =

Studio album by Twiztid
- Released: April 26, 2019
- Studio: The Dojo (Michigan)
- Genre: Rap rock
- Length: 57:13
- Labels: Majik Ninja Entertainment; MNE 100
- Producers: A Danger Within; Seven; YYBeats; Godsynth; Young Wicked; Fritz the Cat; Lunar⋆Vision; Twiztid (add.)

Twiztid chronology
The Continuous Evilution of Life's ?'s (2017)	Generation Nightmare (2019)	Mad Season (2020)

Singles from Generation Nightmare
- 1. "Here With the Dead" Released: October 1, 2018; 2. "Sick Mind" Released: January 18, 2019; 3. "Livin' at the Bottom" Released: January 25, 2019; 4. "Magic Spellz" Released: March 8, 2019; 5. "Something New" Released: March 29, 2019; 6. "Phlegm in the Windpipe" Released: April 12, 2019; 7. "Don't Be Hatin'" Released: April 22, 2019; 8. "4 the Nightmare Children" Released: June 13, 2019; 9. "Live Forever" Released: August 16, 2019; 10. "Wreck" Released: September 9, 2019; 11. "Role Models" Released: September 29, 2019

Generation Nightmare is the twelfth studio album by American hip hop duo Twiztid. It was released on April 26, 2019 through Majik Ninja Entertainment, with distribution via INgrooves. Recording sessions took place at the Dojo in Michigan. Production was handled by A Danger Within, Michael "Seven" Summers, YYBeats, Godsynth, Young Wicked, Fritz the Cat and Lunar⋆Vision. The album features guest appearances from Alla Xul Elu, Young Wicked and Tuckas Budghras.

== Track listing ==
No.	Title	Producer(s)	Length
1.	"Live Forever"	A Danger Within	2:31
2.	"Phlegm in the Windpipe"	A Danger Within	2:51
3.	"Speak Of"	Young Wicked	3:14
4.	"Something New"	Seven; Twiztid (add.); Young Wicked (add.)	2:50
5.	"Siamese Amazement"	A Danger Within	2:09
6.	"Sick Mind"	Godsynth	4:05
7.	"Here With the Dead"	Seven	3:17
8.	"Disappear"	Seven	3:16
9.	"Bring Me Back"	Godsynth	2:39
10.	"Magic Spellz"	A Danger Within	2:57
11.	"Livin' @ the Bottom"	Seven	3:30
12.	"Skit 17"	YYBeats	1:29
13.	"Let It Flow"	YYBeats	1:51
14.	"Don't Be Hatin'" (featuring Young Wicked)	YYBeats	3:57
15.	"Role Models"	Godsynth	3:20
16.	"Wreck"	A Danger Within	3:34
17.	"If It Matters What I Think Now"	A Danger Within; Young Wicked (add.)	3:30
18.	"4 the Nightmare Children"	YYBeats	1:31
19.	"The End of the Beginning" (featuring Tuckas Budghras)	Fritz "The Cat" Van Kosky	1:00
20.	"V5 - Strike" (featuring Alla Xul Elu)	Lunar⋆Vision	3:31
Total length:			57:13

== Personnel ==
- James "Madrox" Spaniolo – main performer, additional producer (track 4)
- Paul "Monoxide" Methric – main performer, additional producer (track 4)
- James "Young Wicked" Garcia – performer (track 14), producer (track 3), additional producer (tracks: 4, 17), mixing (tracks: 1, 3, 4, 6–9, 11–15, 17–20)
- Tuckas Budghras – performer (track 19)
- Alla Xul Elu – performer (track 20)
- Leor Dimant – scratches (tracks: 2, 15)
- John Sustar – scratches (track 8)
- Drayven Davidson – percussion, live drums, producer (tracks: 1, 2, 5, 10, 16, 17)
- Jared Farrell – producer (tracks: 1, 2, 5, 10, 16, 17)
- Michael "Seven" Summers – producer (tracks: 4, 7, 8, 11)
- YYBeats – producer (tracks: 12–14, 18)
- Brett "GodSynth" Saunders – producer (tracks: 6, 9, 15)
- Fritz "The Cat" Van Kosky – producer (track 19), recording, engineering
- Lunar⋆Vision – producer (track 20)
- Johnny Andrews – mixing (tracks: 2, 5, 10, 16)
- Paul Logus – mastering
- Eric Shetler – design, layout
- Austin Pardun – additional design
- George Vhalakis – management

== Charts ==
Chart (2019)	Peak position
US Billboard 200	51
US Top Alternative Albums (Billboard)	5
US Top R&B/Hip-Hop Albums (Billboard)	27
US Independent Albums (Billboard)	3
