= Abominationz =

Studio album by Twiztid
- Released: October 22, 2012
- Recorded: 2012
- Genre: Horrorcore
- Length: 55:43
- Label: Psychopathic
- Producers: Joe Strange; Seven

Twiztid chronology
Heartbroken & Homicidal (2010)	Abominationz (2012)	A New Nightmare (2013)

Abominationz is the ninth studio album by American hip hop duo Twiztid. It was released on October 22, 2012, through Psychopathic Records, marking it their final album for the label. Production was handled by Seven and Joe Strange, with Bree and Twiztid themselves serving as additional producers. It features guest appearances from Insane Clown Posse and Royce da 5'9", and contributions from Leah Stalker, Blaze Ya Dead Homie and George Vlahakis, as well as Krizz Kaliko and Glasses Malone contributed to the deluxe edition of the album.

The album peaked at number 18 on the Billboard 200, number 2 on the Top Rap Albums, number 4 on the Independent Albums and number 6 on the Tastemakers charts in the United States.

== Background ==
On August 16, 2011, member Monoxide Child stated via Twitter that the next Twiztid album would feature a guest appearance from Hopsin. However, this ultimately did not happen.

On April 18, 2012, both Jamie Madrox and Monoxide were interviewed on Strange Music's BlogTalkRadio. During the interview, they revealed the new album's title, Abominationz.

Recording for the album started in the first week of February 2012 and ended in late March 2012 as Twiztid prepared for their 'Kaos and Kronik' tour. While Twiztid was on tour, Joe Strange began mixing songs; further, recording of the album resumed in June 2012 after Twiztid had returned from tour. The album was finished being recorded and mixed between June 2012 and September 2012.

== Music and lyrics ==
Record producer Michael "Seven" Summers provided a more varied sound for Twiztid on Abominationz, culling from blues on "Bad Side", providing a power ballad sound for "LDLHA-IBCSYWA" and generally drawing from electro and rap rock throughout the album, as well as underlining the raps and music with horror film-inspired sound design. For the album, Twiztid adopted a faster rapping style which allowed the duo to write more lyrics for the album than previous efforts. The duo's primary lyrical inspiration for the album was anger and hatred, with elements of dark humor, including gallows humor.

== Release ==
The pamphlet included with Insane Clown Posse's album The Mighty Death Pop! announced that Twiztid's Abominationz would be released on October 23, 2012. The release date was later pushed up to October 22. On October 4, the track listing for Abominationz was revealed. On October 9, the single and a series of samples from the album were released.

Abominationz was released in alternate variant editions, each containing unique outer artwork depicting photographs of Jamie Madrox and Monoxide and a bonus track. The Madrox edition contained the bonus track "Return of the Pervert", and the Monoxide edition contained the bonus track "Sux 2 B U", which featured guest vocals by Krizz Kaliko and Glasses Malone. These variant editions were made available to purchase separately, or as a combo. The combined order was shipped with a poster. Those that purchased both Abominationz and Cold 187um's The Only Solution within two weeks of the album's release date also received a bonus CD containing Psychopathic Records' "Psyphers". In a December 4, 2014, interview, Twiztid stated that they were going to re-release the album together with W.I.C.K.E.D.. The deluxe edition was released in 2019 through Majik Ninja Entertainment.

== Critical reception ==
Professional ratings
Review scores
Source	Rating
AllMusic	3.5/5 stars

In his review for AllMusic, David Jeffries gave the album 3.5 stars out of 5, writing: "as far as Twiztid as rappers, here they're as shameless and gross [...] as ever, although the tempo of their delivery has steadily increased, making the Abominationz lyric sheet longer than previous albums. [...] Abominationz finds Twiztid delivering the hyped-up, hate-filled, horror-rap goods with plenty of punch and the grimmest of jokes".

== Track listing ==
No.	Title	Writer(s)	Producer(s)	Length
1.	"Bad Side"	Jamie Spaniolo; Paul Methric	Seven	4:04
2.	"Unstoppable"	Spaniolo; Methric	Seven; Twiztid (add.); Joe Strange (add.)	4:32
3.	"Rep That Wicked"	Spaniolo; Methric	Seven	3:31
4.	"He's Looking at Me"	Spaniolo; Methric		1:00
5.	"Blood... All I Need"	Spaniolo; Methric	Seven	3:23
6.	"Lift Me Up"	Spaniolo; Methric	Seven	4:00
7.	"Extension Chords"	Spaniolo; Methric	Seven	3:08
8.	"Psychopathic Psychiatric Care" (performed by Leah Stalker)			1:20
9.	"Coin Flip Lunatic" (featuring Royce da 5'9")	Spaniolo; Methric; Ryan Montgomery	Seven	2:37
10.	"This Is Your Anthem"	Spaniolo; Methric	Seven	3:51
11.	"Abominationz" (featuring Insane Clown Posse)	Spaniolo; Methric; Joseph Bruce; Joseph Utsler	Seven	5:04
12.	"Unable to Cry for Help or to Escape from a Seemingly Impending Evil" (performed by Leah Stalker and George Vlahakis)		Joe Strange; Seven (add.)	2:42
13.	"Nightmarez"	Spaniolo; Methric	Seven	3:17
14.	"2nd 2no 1"	Spaniolo; Methric	Seven; Monoxide Child (add.); Bree (add.)	3:33
15.	"LDLHA-IBCSYWA"	Spaniolo; Methric	Seven	4:41
16.	"It's Hard to Smile When You're..."			1:07
17.	"Return of the Pervert"			3:53
Total length:				55:43

Monoxide edition bonus track
No.	Title	Length
17.	"Sux 2 B U" (featuring Krizz Kaliko and Glasses Malone)	3:48

Notes

- "Return of the Pervert" was meant to be an exclusive track to 'Madrox Version' but due to a mistake at the production it became a hidden track on the regular version. The song is also known as "She Loves It" on iTunes. On the 'Deluxe Edition' of the album, the song appears as the eighteenth track after "Sux 2 B U".

== Personnel ==
- Jamie "Madrox" Spaniolo — vocals (tracks: 1–7, 9–11, 13–16), additional producer (track 2)
- Paul "Monoxide" Methric — vocals (tracks: 1–7, 9–11, 13–16), additional producer (tracks: 2, 14)
- Chris "Blaze Ya Dead Homie" Rouleau — additional vocals (track 6)
- Leah Stalker — vocals (tracks: 8, 12)
- Ryan "Royce da 5'9"" Montgomery — vocals (track 9)
- Joseph "Violent J" Bruce — vocals (track 11)
- Joseph "Shaggy 2 Dope" Utsler — vocals (track 11), additional vocals (track 14)
- George Vlahakis — vocals (track 12)
- Bree — additional vocals & additional producer (track 14)
- Joe Strange — additional guitars (track 5), producer (track 12), additional producer (track 2), recording & mixing
- Jeff Rebrovich — Pianos (track 15)
- Michael "Seven" Summers — producer (tracks: 1–3, 5–7, 9–11, 13–15), additional producer (track 12)
- Eric Davie — recording (track 13)
- Kullen Cruickshank — engineering assistant (tracks: 6, 7, 9, 14, 15)
- Jim Neve — artwork
- Eric "E-Wolf" Wheeler — photography

== Charts ==
Chart (2012)	Peak position
US Billboard 200	18
US Top Rap Albums (Billboard)	2
US Independent Albums (Billboard)	4
US Indie Store Album Sales (Billboard)	6
