= The R.O.C. (rapper) =

American rapper

- Also known as: Sol46
- Born: Bryan Kareen Jones; October 31, 1973 (age 52)
- Origin: Detroit, Michigan, U.S.
- Genres: Hip hop
- Occupation: Rapper
- Years active: 1990–2009; 2012–present
- Labels: Majik Ninja Entertainment; Hatchet House; Virus Independent; Latnem Entertainment; Strength Productions
- Member of: House of Krazees
- Website: www.iamtheroc.com

Bryan Kareen Jones (born October 31, 1973), better known by his stage name The R.O.C. (Raps On Contact), is an American rapper from Detroit, Michigan. He is a founding member of the group House of Krazees, which was originally active from 1992 until 1997, when Hektic (Monoxide) and Mr. Bones (Jamie Madrox) left to form Twiztid, who were subsequently signed to Psychopathic Records.

After performing as the hype man for Blaze Ya Dead Homie, R.O.C. signed to Hatchet House in 2008. After briefly retiring beginning in 2009, The R.O.C. came out of retirement.

The R.O.C. also has a younger brother named Mr. Y.U.G. (Formerly known as RAGZ), who is a known Detroit artist, and has also been featured on many of his tracks, as well as Cousin Evol of Detroit. He also has other younger brothers that made music, but were not as involved. Rann, Killjoy (who is in lockdown), and Chosen Blessed who was killed in a shooting. The R.O.C. is also cousin of Bamm & Esham (The Boogieman a.k.a. The Unholy) through marriage.

== Career ==
The R.O.C.'s first album was released with his cousin Big Father Hightop (Evol of Detroit) & produced by Esham under Strength Productions, titled "Rollin' With Strength". In late 1992, The R.O.C. teamed up with fellow Detroit emcees Paul Methric and Jamie Spaniolo, and the trio then formed House of Krazees. The R.O.C. was first originally the producer of the group and was asked to perform on a couple tracks and it was then decided by Jamie (who went by the name of Big J) and Paul (who went by the name of E.X.P.) that he would be the third member. House of Krazees' catalog was only released on cassette until the group signed to Latnem Intertainment. Problems between House of Krazees and Latnem led the group to leave the label following its 1996 album, Head Trauma. House of Krazees officially disbanded in 1997, due to conflicts with their manager, Walter Stepanenko (Latnem Int. CEO).

Madrox and Monoxide left to join Psychopathic Records in late 1997 as Twiztid. After the last original House of Krazees album, The R.O.C. formed a group with local Detroit acts known as "The Howse" and released one album, titled Esohpromatem which is Metamorphose backwards. It consisted of three official members and a fourth as a feature. They were The R.O.C., Armageddon, The Beast, and Black Widow (Miz Korona) as the feature. Mr. Vitology of Vitology Music Group produced the album and Beast later joined Detroits IT5 Tribe a.k.a. The Indigenous Tribe as Morpheus. The album was also released under HOK's label Latnem Int. After the Howse disbanded, The R.O.C changed his rap name to Sol46. In early 1999, Skrapz joined Sol to help finish HOK's last album 'The Night They Kame Home', and the House of Krazees name was then retired and ended any relationship with Latnem Int..

SOL and Skrapz formed Halfbreed on their own record label, Virus Independent with label mates Mr. F.Reeze (later Dial81) and brother Mr. Y.U.G. and his group 2winn Gunnz with friend 1-I-Bandit. SOL also released another solo album and his only under his second stage name, titled Wormholes.

The R.O.C. later became the hype man for Psychopathic Records artist Blaze Ya Dead Homie. He appears on Blaze's 2007 album Clockwork Gray, on the tracks "Ill Connect", "Inside Looking Out" and "E.O.D." The R.O.C. signed to Hatchet House in 2008 and released an EP, Welcome To The Darkside. In Blaze Ya Dead Homie's pamphlet in Clockwork Gray there was a promotion for a new group formed called Zodiac MPrint composed of The R.O.C.' and Blaze Ya Dead Homie and their new album titled Horrorscope to be released in 2008. Nothing came of the album and The R.O.C. left in 2009. Also on Clockwork Gray, there was a song by a group called Samhein Witch Killaz composed of Zodiac MPrint and Twiztid. They were set to release their debut album titled Bloodletting but after The R.O.C. left Hatchet House the group disbanded. In 2011 on Twiztid's official Twitter account they were asked if Samhein Witch Killaz would ever reform and release another song or their debut album, and the response was "No". Now that Twiztid, Blaze Ya Dead Homie and The R.O.C. are no longer on Psychopathic Records, Samhein Witch Killaz could possibly reform and release their debut album on Twiztid's new record label.

In 2009, R.O.C. announced that he was retiring from music. In 2012, he came out of retirement and appeared on Prozak's EP Nocturnal, contributing a verse on "Knuckle Up". R.O.C. also appeared on Psychopathic's fourth "Psypher", released in October 2012. R.O.C. and Skrapz in 2012 have announced that HalfBreed has reunited as well as Level Jumpers with Dial81, there are no details of their next release, only a few released tracks. R.O.C. has said that he will release a solo album titled, Digital Voodoo. R.O.C., Mr. Bones and Hektic revived House of Krazees in early 2013 and were featured on Twiztid's A New Nightmare EP. Also House of Krazees released a greatest hits compilation titled Casket Cutz on October 23, 2013. Since The R.O.C. has returned to music he has been tweeting about bumping rough cuts of new Zodiac MPrint songs on his official Twitter account. Shortly after Zodiac MPrint created their own official Twitter account. They have been dropping hints about their new album, but not saying very much. The name Skywalkers has been talked about a lot. Also Zodiac MPrint was featured on 2 songs (Beware of the Wolf) and (Gettin Wu Wit It) off of Twiztid's 4 Tha Fam Vol. 2 mixxtape which was released on March 27, 2014. The R.O.C. makes his first appearance on a Blaze Ya Dead Homie album for the first time in seven years, it is his first appearance on a Blaze album since Clockwork Gray. It was announced in mid-October 2014 through his various social media accounts that The R.O.C. will release a new single titled "Don't Look Behind You" during Twiztid's Fright Fest Tour 2014, but only for October 30, October 31 and November 1 dates.

On May 4, 2015, it was announced that The R.O.C. will be rereleasing X-Posed and Oh Hell No! digitally. During Twiztid and Blaze Ya Dead Homie's 2015 GOTJ seminar it was announced that The R.O.C.'s debut album on the label will be out in early 2016. On July 10, 2016, it was announced that The R.O.C. will release a new EP at the GOTJ 2016. No title has been given but speculation has it that it will be titled "The Fucking Preylewd".

On January 1, 2017 The R.O.C. was invited to participate in the Juggalo March On Washington. On January 3, 2017, he declined the invitation.

== Discography ==
=== Solo career ===
- Rollin' With Strength EP (1992) (Strength Productions)
- X-Posed (1996) (Latnem Records)
- Wormholes EP (2001) [as Sol46] (Virus Independent)
- Bits & Pieces (2004) (Independent)
- I'm Here EP (2005) (Independent)
- Oh Hell No! (2006) (Independent)
- Welcome To The Darkside EP (2008) (Hatchet House)
- The Fucking Preylewd EP (GOTJ 2016) (Majik Ninja Entertainment)
- Digital Voodoo (April 14, 2017) (Majik Ninja Entertainment)
- Monsters Ain't Real (November 15, 2019)(Majik Ninja Entertainment)

=== Zodiac MPrint ===
- Ride The Stars EP (May 20, 2016) (Majik Ninja Entertainment)

=== House of Krazees ===
- Home Sweet Home (1993)
- Home Bound (1994)
- Season Of The Pumpkin (1994)
- Outbreed (1995)
- Head Trauma (1996)
- Collectors Edition 97 ("Remix & Rewind") (1997)
- The Night They Kame Home (1999)
- Casket Cutz (2013)
- Post Apocalyptic World (2018)
- 31 (2024)
- I Heart 31 (2025)

=== Samhein Witch Killaz ===
- Bloodletting EP (September 2024)

=== HalfBreed ===
- Serial Killaz
- Killaz Of The World (Unreleased)
- KontamiNATION
- Rage of The Plague
- The End

=== The Howse ===
- Esohpromatem

=== Level Jumpers ===
- Simply Complex
- Red Pyramid

=== Guest appearances ===
Year	Song	Artist	Album
2007	"Feel Me"	Twiztid	Independents Day
2008	"Bodies Fall" (w/ Tech N9ne, Kutt Calhoun, & Blaze Ya Dead Homie)	Prozak	Tales From The Sick
2012	"Vengeance"	T.O.N.E-Z	Underground Collabos
2012	"Underground Spittaz" (w/ Daddy X, The Dirtball, & Whitney Peyton)	T.O.N.E-Z	Underground Collabos
2012	"Knuckle Up" (w/ The Dirtball)	Prozak	Nocturnal EP
2013	"Who Am I?" (w/ Scum & PSYCHOjesus)	Bukshot	Helter Skelter: The Deluxe Edition
2013	Monstrosity	Twiztid	A New Nightmare
2015	"Killing Me" (w/ Krizz Kaliko, & Blaze Ya Dead Homie	Prozak	Black Ink
2016	"Fast Life"	614 Villainz	The Return
2016	"Diabolic"	Kung Fu Vampire	Look Alive
2016	"They Call That Gangsta" (w/Lex "The Hex" Master)	Blaze Ya Dead Homie	The Casket Factory
2017	Psychomania (w/Blaze Ya Dead Homie, Lex "The Hex" Master, G-Mo Skee & Boondox)	Twiztid	The Continuous Evilution Of Life's ?'s
2018	"Exit Wounds" (w/ Psycho Jesus, Liquid Assassin, Kidcrusher, Whitney Peyton, Ajax, Grewsum, Scum, F-Dux, Jason Porter, Ronnie Blaze, Darko, Sutter Kain, Kung Fu Vampire, & Mars)	Underground Avengers	Apollyon Edition
2019	"Robbin' Hood" (w/ Lex "The Hex" Master)	Blaze Ya Dead Homie	Graveyard Greats
2019	"Wasted 3" (w/ Twiztid, Rittz, Young Wicked, King Gordy, Blaze Ya Dead Homie, G-Mo Skee, & Redd)	Various	Songs To Smoke To
2019	"Keep Movin'"	Various	Songs To Smoke To
2020	"Real Talk"	Redd	Symphony of Sympathy

=== Music videos ===
Year	Title	Director(s)	Album	Artist	Role
2017	Digital Voodoo		Digital Voodoo	The R.O.C.	Main Performer
2017	Outlined In Chalk (w/Twiztid, Blaze Ya Dead Homie, Lex "The Hex" Master, G-Mo Skee, Gorilla Voltage & Young Wicked)		The Murder	Boondox	Featured Performer
2018	Sleeper Cell (w/Whitney Peyton & R.A. the Rugged Man)		Digital Voodoo	The R.O.C.	Main Performer

=== Group music videos ===
Year	Title	Director(s)	Album	Artist	Role
2016	Keep It Jumpin'		Ride The Stars EP	Zodiac MPrint	Main Performer
2018	Death 4 Any1 Who....		No Album	House Of Krazees	Main Performer

== Awards and nominations ==
Year	Nominee / work	Award	Result	Ref.
2018	Digital Voodoo	Detroit Music Award for Outstanding Rap Recording	Nominated	
2019	Himself	Detroit Music Award for Outstanding Rap Artist	Nominated	
