= My Filthy Spirit Bomb =

2016 album by G-Mo Skee

Studio album by G-Mo Skee
- Released: December 2, 2016
- Studio: The Blap Cave (Vallejo, California)
- Genre: Hip-hop
- Length: 60:01
- Label: Majik Ninja Entertainment; MNE 032
- Producer: Chase Moore; C-Lance; David Rothbard; Fritz; Hopsin; Kage; Mok Beats; Nobe; Seven; YpOnTheBeat

G-Mo Skee chronology
The Android Filfteen EP (2015)	My Filthy Spirit Bomb (2016)	Chaly & The Filth Factory (2018)

Singles from My Filthy Spirit Bomb

Professional ratings
Review scores
Source	Rating
AllMusic	3/5 stars

My Filthy Spirit Bomb is the debut solo studio album by American rapper G-Mo Skee Aka Jaron Johnson from Richmond, California. It was released on December 2, 2016, via Majik Ninja Entertainment. Recording sessions took place at the Blap Cave in Vallejo, California. Production was handled by Chase Moore, C-Lance, David Rothbard, Fritz, Hopsin, Kage, Mok Beats, Nobe, Seven and YpOnTheBeat. It features guest appearances from the Inf Gang, Hopsin, Twiztid and D12 among others.

Music videos were released for "Honey Badger", "G", "Human Cloth", "Filthnificent", and "My Filthy Spirit Bomb". The album peaked at No. 191 on the Billboard 200, No. 10 on the Top R&B/Hip-Hop Albums chart, No. 4 on the Top Rap Albums chart, and No. 9 on the Independent Albums chart in the United States.

== Track listing ==
Credits adapted from Spotify.

No.	Title	Producer(s)	Length
1.	"Intro"	Nobe	0:41
2.	"Slide"	Seven	3:32
3.	"Sawed Off"	Seven	2:31
4.	"Human Cloth"	YpOnTheBeat	3:05
5.	"G"	C-Lance	4:29
6.	"And So It Was Written"	Seven	3:15
7.	"Filthnificent"	MOK BEATS	3:04
8.	"Better Dayz" (featuring Inf Gang)	Nobe	4:43
9.	"I'm Already Dead"	C-Lance	3:35
10.	"Jaylin"	Seven	3:22
11.	"Skit" (featuring Linzy Brighton and Jaylin Johnson)	Nobe; Fritz	0:56
12.	"Am I Crazy"	Nobe	3:34
13.	"Our Bitch" (featuring Mouton, Kuzzn Bank and KJ)	Kage	5:44
14.	"Unfeigned" (featuring Hopsin, Katz and Twiztid)	Seven; Hopsin	4:25
15.	"Honey Badger"	Chase Moore	3:27
16.	"Lone Wolf II"	Seven	4:58
17.	"Dragonball Skeet" (featuring Kuzzn Bank)	YpOnTheBeat	0:42
18.	"My Filthy Spirit Bomb"	Seven; David Rothbard	4:50
Total length:			60:01

== Personnel ==
- Jaron Johnson – main performer, art direction, album concept
- Nobe Infgang – featured artist (track 8), producer (tracks: 1, 8, 11, 12, 19), recording, engineering
- J. Cash – featured artist (track 8), recording, engineering
- Crowda – featured artist (track 8)
- Jaylin Johnson – featured artist (track 11)
- Linzy Brighton – featured artist (track 11)
- Kuzzn Bank – featured artist (tracks: 13, 17), recording, engineering
- Mouton – featured artist (track 13)
- KJ – featured artist (track 13)
- Marcus Jamal Hopson – featured artist & producer (track 14)
- Katz – featured artist (track 14)
- James "Madrox" Spaniolo – featured artist (track 14), art direction
- Paul "Monoxide" Methric – featured artist (track 14), art direction
- Rufus Johnson – featured artist (track 19)
- Von Carlisle – featured artist (track 19)
- Ondre Moore – featured artist (track 19)
- Michael "Seven" Summers – producer (tracks: 2, 3, 6, 10, 14, 16, 18)
- YpOnTheBeat – producer (tracks: 4, 17), recording, engineering
- Craig "C-Lance" Lanciani – producer (tracks: 5, 9)
- MOK Beats – producer (track 7)
- Fritz – producer (track 11)
- Kage – producer (track 13)
- Chase Moore – producer (track 15)
- David Rothbard – producer (track 18)
- The Jokerr – mixing, mastering
- Matt Oleksiak – mixing (track 5)
- E-Dubb – mixing (track 8)
- George Vhalakis – art direction, management
- Michael Winagar – art direction
- Eric Shetler – design, layout
- Mark Kosobucki – design
- Marc Nader – photography

== Charts ==
Chart (2016)	Peak position
US Billboard 200	191
US Top R&B/Hip-Hop Albums (Billboard)	10
US Independent Albums (Billboard)	9
