= Heartbroken & Homicidal =

Studio album by Twiztid
- Released: September 21, 2010
- Recorded: 2010
- Length: 45:19
- Label: Psychopathic Records
- Producers: Monoxide Child, Eric Davie, Brian Kuma

Twiztid chronology
W.I.C.K.E.D. (2009)	Heartbroken & Homicidal (2010)	Abominationz (2012)

Heartbroken & Homicidal is the eighth studio album by American hip hop duo Twiztid. Released on September 21, 2010, the album features guest drums and vocals by Stefanie Eulinberg, drummer for Kid Rock's backing band Twisted Brown Trucker. The album focuses on the connection between love and loss, and the darkside of an individual's hurt feelings. It debuted number 29 on the Billboard 200 chart and number 3 on the Top Independent Albums and Top Rap Albums charts.

== Production ==
Eric Davie produced the song "Cyanide," "I'm Stuck", "What Ya Really Want" while Monoxide served as producer for the rest of the album . Additional musical production was done on 'Circles,' 'Set by Example' and 'All the Rest' by Brian Kuma. Stefanie Eulinberg, drummer for Kid Rock's backing band Twisted Brown Trucker, provided live drums and female vocals on the songs "Circles," "Set By Example," and "All the Rest."

== Musical style ==
Heartbroken & Homicidal has a strongly rock-oriented sound. "Spiderwebs" contains "an ominous set of strings that recall some vintage Hitchcock horror a la PSYCHO", music sampled from the score to the film Death Wish II. "Apple" has a 1970s funk sound and "porn-style wah-wah". Kik Axe Music reviewer James Zahn compares "Circles" to Marilyn Manson's "The Beautiful People" and "Cyanide" to music by Mr. Bungle and White Zombie, while describing "P.S.A." as having a world music-based beat.

== Release ==
The album's 28-page booklet is packaged to look like a notebook, with the liner notes written in invisible ink. Included in the casing is a black pencil which could be used to reveal the album's liner notes, which can also be seen with a black light. In addition to the album's credits, the booklet features fictional entries written by a mentally unstable person. Through the advice of a therapist, the man writes of his breakup and heartbreak; this leads him to begin showing homicidal tendencies.

== Reception ==
Professional ratings
Review scores
Source	Rating
Allmusic	3.5/5 stars
Kik Axe Music	4.5/5 stars

Allmusic reviewer David Jeffries gave the album 3.5 out of 5, saying that "'Heartbroken & Homicidal is not rap-rock duo Twiztid's entry into the emo craze ... [but rather] just straight-up mayhem and disgust." Jeffries noted that the album's deeper lyrics are an example of the group's ever growing strength and evolution, and that the album's producer, Monoxide, packaged the "mature, bummer messages in grinding beats and dark soundscapes that recall the group's early work." Kik Axe Music reviewer James Zahn gave the album a four and a half out of five rating, writing that "the duo has recaptured the feeling of their earlier work" with the "thump and boom [that fans have] been craving."

== Track listing ==
No.	Title	Writer(s)	Producer(s)	Length
1.	"Spiderwebs"	Eric Davie, Paul Robert Methric, Jamie Spaniolo	Monoxide, Eric Davie	4:12
2.	"I'm Just Sayin" (Skit)		Monoxide, Eric Davie	1:17
3.	"What I'm Feelin"	Davie, Methric, Spaniolo	Monoxide, Eric Davie	3:46
4.	"Apple"	Methric, Spaniolo	Monoxide	2:32
5.	"Circles"	Brian Kuma, Methric, Spaniolo	Monoxide, Brian Kuma	2:56
6.	"P.S.A."	Methric, Spaniolo	Monoxide	2:49
7.	"It Don't Matta"	Joseph Bruce, Joseph Utsler, Methric, Spaniolo	Monoxide	3:59
8.	"I'm Stuck"	Methric, Spaniolo	Monoxide	3:21
9.	"Heard Enough"	Bruce, Methric, Spaniolo, Utsler	Monoxide	4:01
10.	"Please" (Skit)		Monoxide	0:50
11.	"Cyanide"	Davie, Methric, Spaniolo	Eric Davie	2:26
12.	"Set By Example"	Brian Kuma, Methric, Spaniolo	Monoxide, Brian Kuma	3:02
13.	"What Ya Really Want"	Davie, Methric, Spaniolo, Utsler	Eric Davie	2:40
14.	"Keys To My Mind"	Methric, Spaniolo	Monoxide	2:58
15.	"All The Rest"	Bruce, Kuma, Methric, Spaniolo	Monoxide, Brian Kuma	5:14

== Personnel ==
Information taken from the album booklet.

Musicians

- Jamie Spaniolo – vocals
- Paul Methric – vocals
- Joey V. – guitar, bass
- Stefanie Eulinberg – drums on "Circles", "Cyanide" and "All the Rest", vocals on "Cyanide" and "All the Rest"
- Jesse Clayton – keyboards
- Ashley Heidrich – additional Vocals
- DJ Wicked – cuts

Production

- Paul Methric – production
- Eric Davie – production, mixing
- Brian Kuma – production, mixing
- Jim Neve – album artwork
- E Wolf – album photos
- Jim Kissling – mastering

== Charts ==
Chart (2010)	Peak position
US Billboard 200	29
US Top Independent Albums	3
US Top Rap Albums	3
