= Revelashen =

Studio album by Twiztid
- Released: November 27, 2020
- Length: 42:10
- Labels: Majik Ninja Entertainment; MNE153
- Producers: ScatteredBrains; Seven; Young Wicked

Twiztid chronology
Mad Season (2020)	Revelashen (2020)	Unlikely Prescription (2021)

Singles from Revelashen
- 1. "Laughable" Released: July 17, 2020; 2. "Hold Up" Released: August 7, 2020; 3. "We Just Wanna Be Heard" Released: August 28, 2020

Revelashen, stylized as the phonetic "/ˌrevəˈlāSH⁽ᵊ⁾n/", is the fourteenth studio album by American hip hop duo Twiztid. It was released on November 27, 2020 via Majik Ninja Entertainment. Production was handled by Michael "Seven" Summers, Young Wicked and ScatteredBrains. It features guest appearances from Young Wicked, Kid Bookie and Lex "The Hex" Master.

== Track listing ==
No.	Title	Writer(s)	Producer(s)	Length
1.	"Hallelujah"	Jamie Spaniolo; Paul Methric; James Garcia	Young Wicked	3:30
2.	"Blueprint"	Spaniolo; Methric	Seven	3:14
3.	"We Just Wanna Be Heard"	Spaniolo; Methric	Seven, Young Wicked	3:17
4.	"Get Through the Day"	Spaniolo; Methric	ScatteredBrains	3:04
5.	"Come Alive" (featuring Kid Bookie and Young Wicked)	Spaniolo; Methric; Tyronne Hill; Garcia	Young Wicked	4:51
6.	"Clear"	Spaniolo; Methric	Seven, Young Wicked	2:25
7.	"Hold Up" (featuring Young Wicked)	Spaniolo; Methric; Garcia	Young Wicked	5:23
8.	"Separate"	Spaniolo; Methric	Seven, Young Wicked	3:04
9.	"Twinz"	Spaniolo; Methric	Seven, Young Wicked	3:06
10.	"Laughable" (featuring Young Wicked and Lex "The Hex" Master)	Spaniolo; Methric; Garcia; Jeremiah Johnson	Young Wicked	3:44
11.	"Change Me"	Spaniolo; Methric	Seven, Young Wicked	3:35
12.	"Never Be Nothing"	Spaniolo; Methric	Seven, Young Wicked	2:53
Total length:				42:10

== Charts ==
Chart (2020)	Peak position
US Current Album Sales (Billboard)	57
