= Mirror Mirror (EP) =

EP by Twiztid
- Released: April 9, 2002
- Recorded: Lotus Pod (Farmington Hills, Michigan)
- Length: 37:33
- Label: Psychopathic Records
- Producers: Fritz "The Cat" Van Kosky; Jamie Madrox; Monoxide Child

Twiztid chronology
Freek Show (2000)	Mirror Mirror (2002)	The Green Book (2003)

Mirror Mirror is the first extended play and third major release by American hip hop duo Twiztid. It was released on April 9, 2002, through Psychopathic Records. Production was handled by Fritz "The Cat" Vankosky and both Twiztid members. It features guest appearances from Blaze Ya Dead Homie and Violent J.

== Reception ==
Professional ratings
Review scores
Source	Rating
AllMusic	3/5 stars

The album peaked at #103 on the Billboard 200 and at #5 on the Independent Albums in the United States.

AllMusic writer Bradley Torreano wrote that "Songs like 'CNT' are teenage anthems that actually have more than a passing similarity" to Detroit rapper Eminem, and "despite the fact that few outside the juggalo community will give this a chance, this might be one of the most accurate portrayals of the mood of most unhappy young people in 2002".

== Track listing ==
All music is composed by Fritz Vankosky, James Spaniolo and Paul Methric.

No.	Title	Writer(s)	Length
1.	"Mirror"	P. Methric; J. Spaniolo	1:06
2.	"Reflection"	P. Methric; J. Spaniolo	3:15
3.	"The World"	P. Methric; J. Spaniolo	3:31
4.	"4 Thoze of U (feat. Blaze Ya Dead Homie)"	P. Methric; J. Spaniolo; C. Rouleau	3:52
5.	"Through Your Eyez"	P. Methric; J. Spaniolo	4:10
6.	"Whatz That!?!"	P. Methric; J. Spaniolo	3:34
7.	"Leff Field (feat. Violent J)"	P. Methric; J. Bruce	2:20
8.	"Dirty Lil' Girl"	P. Methric; J. Spaniolo	3:57
9.	"CNT"	P. Methric; J. Spaniolo	3:12
10.	"Alone"	P. Methric; J. Spaniolo	3:06
11.	"You're the Reazon"	P. Methric; J. Spaniolo	5:30
Total length:			37:33

== Personnel ==
- Jamie "Madrox" Spaniolo – vocals (tracks: 1–6, 8–11), producer, mixing & recording
- Paul "Monoxide" Methric – vocals, producer, mixing & recording
- Chris Rouleau – vocals (track 4)
- Joseph Bruce – vocals (track 7)
- Fritz Vankosky – producer

== Charts ==
Chart (2002)	Peak position
US Billboard 200	103
US Independent Albums (Billboard)	5
