= The Darkness (Twiztid album) =

Studio album by Twiztid
- Released: January 27, 2015
- Recorded: 2014
- Studio: The Dojo (Michigan)
- Length: 56:14
- Labels: Majik Ninja Entertainment; MNE 002
- Producers: Seven; Jake One; The Dead Beatz; Fritz the Cat; Joe Strange; Eric Davie

Twiztid chronology
A New Nightmare (2013)	The Darkness (2015)	The Continuous Evilution of Life's ?'s (2017)

Singles from The Darkness
- 1. "Boogieman" Released: December 3, 2014; 2. "Back To Hell" Released: December 9, 2014; 3. "A Little Fucked Up" Released: January 8, 2015; 4. "No Breaks" Released: July 9, 2015; 5. "F.T.S." Released: November 27, 2015

Darkness
- Outer cardboard slip cover.

Professional ratings
Review scores
Source	Rating
AllMusic	2.5/5 stars

The Darkness is the tenth studio album by American hip hop duo Twiztid. It was released on January 27, 2015, through Majik Ninja Entertainment with distribution via INgrooves. Recording sessions took place at the Dojo, a MNE recording studio in Michigan. Production was handled by Michael "Seven" Summers, Jake One, Eric Davie, Fritz the Cat and the Dead Beatz.

The album peaked at No. 29 on the Billboard 200, at No. 3 on the Top Rap Albums chart, and No. 5 on the Independent Albums chart in the United States.

== Background ==
In early to mid-2014 Twiztid released a promo video; it was said that Twiztid's next album would be called The Darkness. Twiztid was asked if the album would have any features and Monoxide had said "No. This is just me and Jamie from start to finish, no features". It was in contrast to the duo's previous release A New Nightmare in 2013, which had a large array of guest features.

Twiztid stated in a later 2014 interview that they would release short promo videos from December 2014 until January 2015 to help promotion for the album. They said that some of the videos they are in, and some of them they aren't. On November 26, 2014, Twiztid released the album cover art, and the track list for The Darkness. Two of the three bonus tracks ("Breakdown" and "Mind Goes Mad") were featured on their Get Twiztid EP (which was previously released on April 15, 2014, and on the Bootleg Banner Tour with Blaze Ya Dead Homie), albeit slightly edited in length. The third bonus track "A Place in the Woods" was previously released as a limited edition VIP single, with a slightly different mix.

On December 3, 2014, Twiztid released the first single off the album, "Boogieman". On December 9, 2014, Twiztid released the second single via Rolling Stone website titled, "Back to Hell". On December 17, 2014, Twiztid released their first promo video for their upcoming album, The Darkness, titled "Hostage". On January 8, 2015, via Revolver (magazine), Twiztid released the third single off The Darkness titled "A Little Fucked Up". On January 9, 2015, Twiztid released the second promo video for The Darkness titled "Family Time". The first music video off the album was "A Little Fucked Up" which was released on February 11, 2015. On March 17, 2015, the second music video, "Boogieman" was released via Revolver. On July 9, 2015, the third music video, "No Breaks", was released via Twiztid-Shop.com, their online store.

== Track listing ==
All tracks are written by James Spaniolo and Paul Robert Methric.

No.	Title	Producer(s)	Length
1.	"Why Won't You Answer"		2:44
2.	"Afraid of the Dark"	Seven	1:27
3.	"In Hell"	The Dead Beatz	4:35
4.	"Back to Hell"	Fritz "the Cat" Van Kosky	3:36
5.	"Problems with Medication"		0:26
6.	"A Little Fucked Up"	Jake One; Joe Strange (add.)	3:41
7.	"Boogieman" (Skit)		1:04
8.	"Boogieman"	Seven; Joe Strange (add.)	4:23
9.	"Down Here"	Seven; Joe Strange (add.)	4:48
10.	"Dr. Weasel"		0:43
11.	"F.T.S."	Seven	3:20
12.	"Take It Away"	Seven	4:19
13.	"On and On"	Seven	3:03
14.	"No Breaks"	Seven	2:48
15.	"Seance"	Jake One	3:08
16.	"The Exorcism"	Eric Davie; Joe Strange	1:02
Total length:			45:08

Deluxe edition
No.	Title	Producer(s)	Length
17.	"Breakdown"	The Dead Beatz	3:55
18.	"Mind Goes Mad"	Seven	3:37
19.	"A Place in the Woods" (featuring Blaze Ya Dead Homie)	Seven	3:45
Total length:			56:25

== Personnel ==
- Jamie "Madrox" Spaniolo – lyrics, vocals, music
- Paul "Monoxide" Methric – lyrics, vocals, music
- Ashley M Price – vocals (tracks: 1, 8)
- Sid Haig – vocals (track 5)
- Eric Davie – additional vocals (track 8), producer (track 16), engineering
- Michael Winagar – additional vocals (track 8)
- Bill Moseley – vocals (track 10)
- Michael "Seven" Summers – producer (tracks: 2, 8–9, 11–14, 18–19)
- The Dead Beatz – producer (tracks: 3, 17)
- Fritz "The Cat" Van Kosky – producer (track 4), engineering
- Jacob Brian Dutton – producer (tracks: 6, 15)
- Joe Strange – producer (track 16), additional producer (tracks: 6, 8, 9), mixing
- Kullen Cruickshank – assistant engineering
- Jim Kissling – mastering
- Tate Steinsiek – art direction, artwork
- Eric Shetler – additional artwork
- Jim Neve – design, layout
- Jason Shaltz – photography
- George Vlahakis – management
- Chris Rouleau – lyrics & vocals (track 19)

== Charts ==
Chart (2015)	Peak position
US Billboard 200	29
US Top Rap Albums (Billboard)	3
US Top Album Sales (Billboard)	18
US Vinyl Albums (Billboard)	24
US Independent Albums (Billboard)	5
US Indie Store Album Sales (Billboard)	22
