= A New Nightmare =

Mixtape by Twiztid
- Released: July 30, 2013
- Studio: The Disc
- Genre: Rap rock
- Length: 46:16
- Labels: Twiztid, LLC; TWIZ-001
- Producers: Seven; The Dead Beatz; Eric Davie

Twiztid chronology
Abominationz (2012)	A New Nightmare (2013)	The Darkness (2015)

Professional ratings
Review scores
Source	Rating
AllMusic	3/5 stars

A New Nightmare is the first mixtape (or extended play) by American hip hop duo Twiztid, and is their 11th major release overall. It was self-released on July 30, 2013, marking the group's first project since leaving Psychopathic Records in December 2012. First released on the group's official website store, it was released nationwide on September 3, 2013, and re-released on November 20, 2018, via Majik Ninja Entertainment. Recording sessions took place at "The Disc". Production was handled by Michael "Seven" Summers, Eric Davie, and the Dead Beatz. In regards to Twiztid's prior albums, A New Nightmare featured the most guest appearances overall. Guests on the album include as AJAX, Blaze Ya Dead Homie, Bukshot, Caskey, Danny Boone of Rehab, DJ Swamp, Dominic, Irv Da Phenom, Jared Gomes of (həd) p.e., JellyRoll, Johnny Richter, Lil Wyte, Liquid Assassin, Mickey Avalon, Swollen Members, The R.O.C., Wrekonize of ¡Mayday!, Aqualeo, and Anybody Killa.

The album peaked at number 115 on the Billboard 200, at number 17 on the Top Rap Albums, and at number 23 on the Independent Albums in the United States.

== Track listing ==
No.	Title	Writer(s)	Producer(s)	Length
1.	"Wake Me Up"		Eric Davie	1:15
2.	"Down with Us" (feat. Wrekonize)	J. Spaniolo; P. Methric; B. Miller	The Dead Beatz	4:30
3.	"Unjust Love" (feat. Mickey Avalon & Danny "Boone" Alexander)	J. Spaniolo; P. Methric; Y. Perl; D. Alexander	Seven	4:08
4.	"The Deep End" (feat. Dominic & Caskey)	J. Spaniolo; P. Methric; Dominic; B. Caskey	The Dead Beatz	5:31
5.	"Sick Man" (feat. Blaze Ya Dead Homie)	J. Spaniolo; P. Methric; C. Rouleau	Seven	3:59
6.	"Screaming Out" (feat. Dominic & Irv Da Phenom)	J. Spaniolo; P. Methric; Dominic; M. Irving Jr.	Seven	4:19
7.	"Wasted" (feat. AJAX, Blaze Ya Dead Homie, Bukshot, Jahred, Jelly Roll, Lil Wyte, Johnny Richter & Liquid Assassin)	J. Spaniolo; P. Methric; C. Rouleau; T. Kalbfleisch; P. Gomes; J. DeFord; P. Lanshaw; T. McNutt; C. Toombs; AJAX	Seven	9:46
8.	"Falling Down" (feat. Swollen Members)	J. Spaniolo; P. Methric; Swollen Members	The Dead Beatz	4:20
9.	"Monstrosity" (feat. The R.O.C.)	J. Spaniolo; P. Methric; B. Jones	Seven; Eric Davie (add.)	4:05
Total length:				42:00

National release bonus track
No.	Title	Writer(s)	Length
10.	"Monstrosity (Angelspit Remix)" (performed by the House of Krazees, feat. Anybody Killa & Aqualeo)	J. Spaniolo; P. Methric; J. Lowery; Aqualeo	4:23
Total length:			46:16

Digital promotional single (exclusive to SoundCloud)
No.	Title	Length
10.	"How I Live (Super High Remix)" (feat. Proof)	3:45

iTunes bonus track
No.	Title	Length
10.	"Down with Us (Angelspit Remix)"	3:40

== Personnel ==
- Jamie "Madrox" Spaniolo – main performer
- Paul "Monoxide" Methric – main performer
- Benjamin Miller – performer (track 2)
- Yeshe Perl – performer (track 3)
- Danny "Boone" Alexander – performer (track 3)
- Dominic – performer (tracks: 4, 6)
- Brandon Caskey – performer (track 4)
- Chris Rouleau – performer (tracks: 5, 7)
- Mitchell Irving Jr. – performer (track 6)
- AJAX – performer (track 7)
- Tim Kalbfleisch – performer (track 7)
- Paulo Sergio "Jared" Gomes – performer (track 7)
- Jason DeFord – performer (track 7)
- Patrick Lanshaw – performer (track 7)
- Timothy McNutt – performer (track 7)
- Cardell Avila Toombs – performer (track 7)
- Swollen Members – performers (track 8)
- Bryan Jones – performer (track 9)
- DJ Swamp – scratches
- Eric Davie – producer (track 1), additional producer (track 9), engineering
- The Dead Beatz – producer (tracks: 2, 4, 8)
- Michael "Seven" Summers – producer (tracks: 3, 5–7, 9)
- Joe Strange – mixing
- Jim Neve – artwork
- Matt Fenner – artwork
- Jason Shaltz – photography
- George Vlahakis – management
- James Lowery – performer (track 10)
- Aqualeo – performer (track 10)

== Charts ==
Chart (2013)	Peak position
US Billboard 200	115
US Top Rap Albums (Billboard)	17
US Independent Albums (Billboard)	23
