= Independents Day (album) =

Studio album by Twiztid
- Released: July 3, 2007
- Recorded: 2006–2007
- Length: 59:35
- Label: Psychopathic
- Producers: Fritz the Cat; Gee Pierce; LostKoast Productions; Monoxide Child; Seven

Twiztid chronology
Mutant (Vol. 2) (2005)	Independents Day (2007)	W.I.C.K.E.D. (2009)

Professional ratings
Review scores
Source	Rating
AllMusic	2.5/5 stars

Independents Day is the sixth studio album by American hip hop duo Twiztid. It was released on July 3, 2007, through Psychopathic Records. Production was handled by Fritz the Cat, G. Pierce, LostKoast Productions, Seven and Monoxide. It features guest appearances from Bizarre, Blaze Ya Dead Homie, DJ Clay, DJ Quik, (həd) ^{p.e.}, Insane Clown Posse, Krizz Kaliko, Potluck, Proof, Tech N9ne, Tha Dogg Pound, The Dayton Family and The R.O.C. The album peaked at number 57 on the Billboard 200, number nine on the Top Rap Albums, number four on the Independent Albums and number eight on the Tastemakers.

The album's credits featured a number of mistakes. For example, the titles of the album's final two tracks were switched, and the names of Bizarre and DJ Quik are misspelled as 'Bizzar' and 'DJ Quick'; as AllMusic's David Jeffries wrote, this "[Ruins] the Blood member's lifelong avoidance of anything that could be short for 'Crip Killer.' [...] It's a metaphor for how well Twiztid blend with their true hip-hop brothers and how much better off they are going for local juggalos like their mentors ICP plus Blaze Ya Dead Homie and their neighbors from the north, the Dayton Family".

The album is also notable for the appearances of D12 members Proof and Bizarre. One of the group's members, Eminem, had feuded with ICP. The track "How I Live" was the final song recorded by Proof before his death in April 2006.

== Track listing ==
No.	Title	Length
1.	"Welcome Home"	2:56
2.	"Monster"	3:00
3.	"Sex, Drugs, Money & Murder" (featuring The Dayton Family)	5:02
4.	"Hurt Someone" (featuring DJ Quik and Tha Dogg Pound)	4:29
5.	"Jus' Like Me"	3:55
6.	"Bussyoheadopen" (featuring Blaze Ya Dead Homie)	3:40
7.	"Feel Me" (featuring The R.O.C.)	3:39
8.	"Raw Deal" (The Juggalo Song)	4:01
9.	"How I Live" (featuring Proof)	4:06
10.	"My Favorite" (featuring DJ Clay)	3:31
11.	"Weak Shitz Out" (featuring (həd) ^{p.e.})	3:23
12.	"Wet Dreams" (featuring Bizarre)	3:57
13.	"Bury 'Em All" (featuring Tech N9ne, Big Krizz Kaliko and Potluck)	6:32
14.	"Monsters Ball" (featuring Insane Clown Posse)	7:06
Total length:		59:35

== Charts ==
Chart (2007)	Peak position
US Billboard 200	57
US Top Rap Albums (Billboard)	9
US Independent Albums (Billboard)	4
US Indie Store Album Sales (Billboard)	8
