= Phatso =

Studio album by Madrox
- Released: May 16, 2006
- Genre: Hip hop
- Length: 45:35
- Label: Psychopathic Records
- Producer: Monoxide Child; Bar None Productions; Fritz The Cat

Madrox chronology
Sacrifice (1995)	Phatso (2006)

Professional ratings
Review scores
Source	Rating
RapReviews	5.5/10

Phatso is the second solo studio album by American rapper Jamie Madrox. It was released on May 16, 2006, through Psychopathic Records, making his only solo release on the label (except re-release of his previous effort, Sacrifice, in 2010). Production was handled by Monoxide Child, Bar None Productions and Fritz "The Cat" Vankosky. It features guest appearances from Twiztid and Blaze Ya Dead Homie. The album peaked at number 107 on the Billboard 200, number 14 on the Top Rap Albums chart, number three on the Independent Albums chart, and number one on the Heatseekers Albums chart in the United States.

== Track listing ==
No.	Title	Writer(s)	Producer(s)	Length
1.	"Hey Phatty"	J. Spaniolo	Fritz The Cat	3:29
2.	"Get 'Em"	J. Spaniolo	Monoxide Child	2:56
3.	"Customer's Always Right"	J. Spaniolo		1:19
4.	"Freak Out"	J. Spaniolo	Bar None Productions	4:02
5.	"This is What We Got..."	J. Spaniolo		0:40
6.	"This Bitch" (featuring Monoxide Child)	J. Spaniolo; P. Methric	Monoxide Child	3:04
7.	"Big Gunz"	J. Spaniolo	Monoxide Child	3:50
8.	"Keep On"	J. Spaniolo	Monoxide Child	3:09
9.	"Sour-Patch Bitches" (featuring Blaze Ya Dead Homie)	J. Spaniolo; C. Rouleau	Monoxide Child	4:30
10.	"O.M.G."	J. Spaniolo	Monoxide Child	3:28
11.	"Pledge Allegiance"	J. Spaniolo	Fritz The Cat	3:03
12.	"4Fist2Axe-Handles" (featuring Monoxide Child)	J. Spaniolo; P. Methric	Monoxide Child	3:47
13.	"Tear Jerker"	J. Spaniolo	Bar None Productions	4:16
14.	"Take It 4 What It Is"	J. Spaniolo	Bar None Productions	4:02
Total length:				45:35

== Personnel ==
- Jamie "Madrox" Spaniolo – main artist
- Paul "Monoxide" Methric – featured artist (tracks: 6, 12), producer (tracks: 2, 6–10, 12), arranger (tracks: 3, 5), mixing (tracks: 1–2, 4, 6–14)
- Chris Rouleau – featured artist (track 9), additional vocals (tracks: 10, 11)
- Jed Thubman – additional vocals (track 3)
- Eddie Cheese a.k.a. Matt Nipz – additional vocals (track 7)
- Rich a.k.a. the Ricker – additional vocals (track 7)
- Fritz "The Cat" Van Kosky – producer (tracks: 1, 11), arranger (tracks: 3, 5), mixing (tracks: 1–2, 4, 6–14)
- Bar None Productions – producer (tracks: 4, 13, 14)

== Charts ==
Chart (2006)	Peak position
US Billboard 200	107
US Top Rap Albums (Billboard)	14
US Independent Albums (Billboard)	3
US Heatseekers Albums (Billboard)	1
