= The Green Book (album) =

Studio album by Twiztid
- Released: July 1, 2003
- Recorded: 2002–2003
- Studio: The Lotus Pod
- Genres: Horrorcore; rap rock
- Length: 65:36
- Label: Psychopathic
- Producers: Mike E. Clark; Systasyrosis Soundsquad

Twiztid chronology
Mirror Mirror (2002)	The Green Book (2003)	Man's Myth (Vol. 1) (2005)

Green Book
- Inner cover

The Green Book is the third studio album by American hip hop duo Twiztid. It was released on July 1, 2003, through Psychopathic Records. Recording sessions took place at the Lotus Pod. Production was handled by the Systasyrosis Soundsquad and Mike E. Clark. It features guest appearances from Insane Clown Posse, Anybody Killa, Blaze Ya Dead Homie, Bushwick Bill, E-40, Esham, Layzie Bone and Tech N9ne. The album peaked at number 52 on the Billboard 200 and number 2 on the Independent Albums in the United States. It was reissued on vinyl for the first time on August 19, 2016, via Majik Ninja Entertainment, leading the album to top the Billboard Vinyl Albums chart and receiving a Detroit Music Awards nomination for Outstanding Anthology/Compilation/Reissue.

== Background ==
After having established themselves with "grandiose" stage personas, Twiztid wanted The Green Book to be more personal in its lyrics; as Jamie Madrox explained, "We wanted people to see that inside those Shogun warriors there were people. After telling them stories about the mutants from Dimension X and all that, it was cool to try to personalize those characters more and let people into who we are as people". This was particularly evident in the song "Fat Kidz", which reflected Jamie's childhood weight issues in a way that he intended to "make being fat cool. 'Be proud to be fat'. It's cool to be fat and try to empower those people who felt they were inferior". It name drops numerous plus-sized public figures and fictional characters, including Biggie Smalls, Chubb Rock, Chris Farley, John Candy, Big Pun, Kevin Smith, E-40, King Kong Bundy, Fat Joe, Blaze Ya Dead Homie, Fat Albert, the Fat Boys and Grimace.

== Critical reception ==
Professional ratings
Review scores
Source	Rating
AllMusic	2/5 stars

AllMusic's Rob Theakston panned the album, writing that while The Green Book was an improvement over Insane Clown Posse's The Wraith: Shangri-La, "Twiztid sounds like a half-hearted attempt at a flaccid Kid Rock or Everlast recording session gone very wrong. Even appearances by the main juggalos themselves can't save this ship from sinking".

On the 20th anniversary of the album, Jamie Madrox said that the album "resonated with people over a long period of time. We're proud of that".

== Track listing ==
No.	Title	Writer(s)	Producer(s)	Length
1.	"The Green Book"	Jamie Spaniolo; Paul Methric		0:52
2.	"On the Other End"	Spaniolo; Methric	Monoxide Child; Fritz the Cat^{[a]}	2:19
3.	"White Trash Wit Tat-2's"	Spaniolo; Methric	Fritz the Cat	3:13
4.	"Afraid of Me"	Spaniolo; Methric	Monoxide Child; Fritz the Cat^{[a]}	4:08
5.	"Wondering Why?"	Spaniolo; Methric	Mike E. Clark	4:21
6.	"Call Me"	Spaniolo; Methric; Joseph Utsler		1:34
7.	"I'm the Only 1" (featuring Shaggy 2 Dope)	Spaniolo; Methric; Utsler	Fritz the Cat; Monoxide Child^{[a]}	2:58
8.	"Speculationz" (featuring E-40)	Spaniolo; Methric; Earl Stevens	Monoxide Child	4:33
9.	"The World is Hell" (featuring Esham)	Spaniolo; Methric; Esham Smith	The Soundsquad	3:53
10.	"Nikateen"	Methric	Fritz the Cat; Monoxide Child	1:07
11.	"U Don't Wanna B Like Me"	Spaniolo; Methric	Fritz the Cat	2:57
12.	"Serial Killa" (featuring Tech N9ne)	Spaniolo; Methric; Aaron Yates	Fritz the Cat; The Soundsquad^{[a]}	2:56
13.	"Marsh Lagoon" (featuring Violent J)	Spaniolo; Methric; Joseph Bruce	Fritz the Cat	5:20
14.	"Bobby's Dad"	Spaniolo; Methric	Fritz the Cat	3:05
15.	"Hydro" (featuring Layzie Bone)	Spaniolo; Methric; Steven Howse	Fritz the Cat; Monoxide Child^{[a]}	5:12
16.	"Frankenstein" (featuring Colton Grundy)	Spaniolo; Methric; Christopher Rouleau	The Soundsquad	3:36
17.	"Everybody Diez" (featuring Anybody Killa and Bushwick Bill)	Spaniolo; Methric; James Lowery; Richard Shaw	Fritz the Cat	4:05
18.	"Fat Kidz"	Spaniolo	Fritz the Cat	1:33
19.	"Hom-Sha-Bom"	Spaniolo; Methric	Fritz the Cat; The Soundsquad^{[a]}	4:32
20.	"Darkness"	Spaniolo	Fritz the Cat; Monoxide Child	3:22
Total length:				1:05:36

Notes

- ^{^[a]} signifies an additional producer.

== Personnel ==
- Jamie "Madrox" Spaniolo – vocals (tracks: 1–9, 11–20), music (track 1), producer (tracks: 9, 16), additional producer (tracks: 12, 19), mixing (tracks: 1–12, 14–20), concept
- Paul "Monoxide" Methric – vocals (tracks: 1–17, 19), music (track 1), producer (tracks: 2, 4, 8–10, 16, 20), additional producer (tracks: 7, 12, 15, 19), mixing (tracks: 1–12, 14–20), concept
- Joseph "Shaggy 2 Dope" Utsler – vocals (tracks: 6, 7)
- Earl "E-40" Stevens – vocals (track 8)
- Esham A. Smith – vocals (track 9)
- Aaron "Tech N9NE" Yates – vocals (track 12)
- Joseph "Violent J" Bruce – vocals and mixing (track 13)
- Rich "Legz Diamond" Murrell – additional vocals (track 13), additional guitar (track 14)
- Steven "Layzie Bone" Howse – vocals (track 15)
- Chris "Blaze Ya Dead Homie" Rouleau – vocals (track 16)
- James "Anybody Killa" Lowery – vocals (track 17)
- Richard "Bushwick Bill" Shaw – vocals (track 17)
- Fritz "The Cat" Van Kosky – guitar (tracks: 2, 16), music (track 1), producer (tracks: 3, 7, 9–20), additional producer (tracks: 2, 4, 12, 19), mixing (tracks: 1–12, 14–20)
- Marco Brushstein – additional guitar (track 20)
- Ashley "Lil' Pig" Horak – drums (track 20)
- DJ EZ-D – scratches
- Mike E. Clark – producer (track 5)
- Eric "Ewolf" Wheeler – photography
- Gary Arnett – design, logo, layout

== Charts ==
Chart (2003)	Peak position
US Billboard 200	52
US Independent Albums (Billboard)	2
