= Mad Season (Twiztid album) =

Studio album by Twiztid
- Released: April 20, 2020
- Studios: The Dojo (Michigan, US); Inkling Studios (New Zealand)
- Genres: Horrorcore; trap; industrial; hardcore hip hop
- Labels: Majik Ninja Entertainment; MNE 133
- Producers: Young Wicked; Godsynth; Fritz the Cat; A Danger Within; Charlie Beans; Jimmy Urine; ScatteredBrains

Twiztid chronology
Generation Nightmare (2019)	Mad Season (2020)	Revelashen (2020)

Mad Season is the thirteenth studio album by American hip hop duo Twiztid. It was released on April 20, 2020 through Majik Ninja Entertainment, with no prior announcement. Recording sessions took place at the Dojo in Michigan and at Inkling Studios in New Zealand. Production was primarily handled by Young Wicked, along with Godsynth, Fritz "The Cat" Van Kosky, A Danger Within, Charlie Beans, Jimmy Urine and ScatteredBrains. It features guest appearances from Axe Murder Boyz, Blaze Ya Dead Homie, Anybody Killa, Bingx, Ekoh, Hyro The Hero, Jimmy Urine and Stevie Stone.

== Track listing ==
No.	Title	Writer(s)	Producer(s)	Length
1.	"Off With They Heads"	Jamie Spaniolo; Paul Methric	Young Wicked	2:42
2.	"Do This 1 More Time"	Jamie Spaniolo; Paul Methric	Fritz "The Cat" Van Kosky; Young Wicked (co.)	2:40
3.	"Everything's Cursed"	Jamie Spaniolo; Paul Methric	Fritz "The Cat" Van Kosky; Young Wicked (co.)	2:55
4.	"That's What They Be Telling Me"	Jamie Spaniolo; Paul Methric	Godsynth; Young Wicked (co.)	3:42
5.	"F Feelings"	Jamie Spaniolo; Paul Methric	Young Wicked	2:53
6.	"Wasted 4" (featuring Bingx, Anybody Killa, Blaze Ya Dead Homie and Axe Murder Boyz)	Jamie Spaniolo; Paul Methric; Christopher Rouleau; James Garcia; James Glemme Lowry; Michael Garcia	Young Wicked	4:56
7.	"Follow Me" (featuring Hyro The Hero)	Jamie Spaniolo; Paul Methric; Hyron Fenton Jr	Charlie Beans; Young Wicked (co.)	3:31
8.	"Hungry Like The Wolf" (featuring Jimmy Urine)	Jamie Spaniolo; Nick Rhodes; John Taylor; Andy Taylor; Simon Le Bon; Roger Andrew Taylor	A Danger Within; Jimmy Urine; Young Wicked (co.)	4:01
9.	"Never Change"	Jamie Spaniolo; Paul Methric	ScatteredBrains; Young Wicked (co.)	3:48
10.	"Fuck Wit Us" (featuring Blaze Ya Dead Homie)	Jamie Spaniolo; Paul Methric; Christopher Rouleau	Godsynth; Young Wicked (co.)	4:50
11.	"My Bible" (featuring Stevie Stone)	Jamie Spaniolo; Paul Methric; Stephen Williams; James Garcia	Young Wicked	4:42
12.	"Slo-Mo"	Jamie Spaniolo; Paul Methric	Godsynth; Young Wicked (co.)	4:07
13.	"4Get U" (featuring Ekoh)	Jamie Spaniolo; Paul Methric; Jeff Anton Thompson; James Garcia	Young Wicked	4:40
Total length:				45:27

== Charts ==
Chart (2020)	Peak position
US Top Album Sales (Billboard)	9
US Independent Albums (Billboard)	38
