= Twiztid =

American hip hop duo

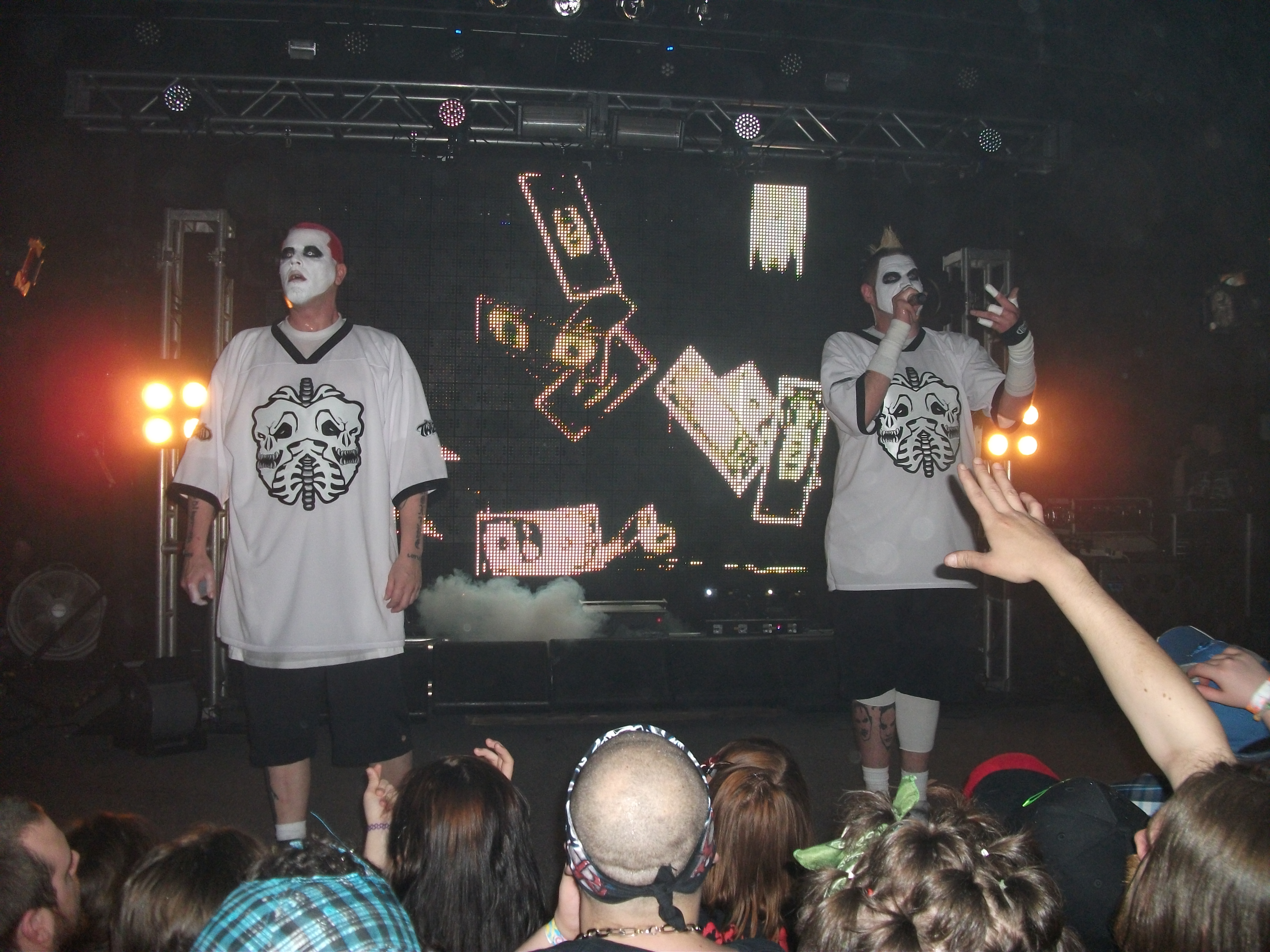
- Twiztid in 2013

Background information
- Origin: Detroit, Michigan, U.S.
- Genres: Horrorcore; hip-hop; rap rock; rap metal
- Years active: 1997–present
- Labels: Majik Ninja; Majik; Island; Psychopathic
- Spinoffs: Dark Lotus
- Members: Jamie Madrox; Monoxide Child
- Website: twiztid.com

Twiztid is an American hip-hop duo from Detroit, Michigan, known for both their horror-themed lyrics and rock-influenced sound. Formed in 1997, Twiztid is composed of rappers Jamie "Madrox" Spaniolo and Paul "Monoxide" Methric. Spaniolo and Methric are also members of the group House of Krazees with Bryan "The R.O.C." Jones, which formed in 1992.

Twiztid was signed with Psychopathic Records from 1997 to 2012. They released their debut album, Mostasteless, in 1998. In addition to the duo's involvement in side projects such as Psychopathic Rydas and Dark Lotus, the releases of Freek Show (2000), Mirror Mirror (2002), and The Green Book (2003) established Twiztid within the horrorcore subgenre and juggalo fanbase. After two solo albums (one each by Methric and Spaniolo) and three Twiztid albums from 2004 to 2007, the duo released their most commercially successful album in 2009, W.I.C.K.E.D., which peaked at No. 11 on the Billboard 200 chart (the third-highest position in Psychopathic's history). After the release of Heartbroken & Homicidal in 2010 and Abominationz in 2012, Twiztid departed from Psychopathic in late 2012.

Although 2013's A New Nightmare was essentially released without backing from a label, Twiztid eventually formed their own label in 2014, Majik Ninja Entertainment (MNE). Around the same time, Spaniolo and Methric reformed House of Krazees with Jones as a side project. 2015's The Darkness then became Twiztid's first album on the MNE label. Their subsequent album in 2017, The Continuous Evilution of Life's ?s, notably appeared on the most Billboard charts in Twiztid's career with seven total. Around the same time, Twiztid established the yearly Astronomicon event which focused on video games, horror films, comic books, and musical acts. Twiztid then released six additional albums between 2019 and 2022 (during that timespan they also formed the spin-off groups The Rydas and Eastside Ninjas). Both Methric and Spaniolo individually released their second solo albums in 2024, followed by another solo album from Spaniolo in early 2025. Twiztid's most recent album, Welcome to Your Funeral, was released in 2025.

== History ==
=== House of Krazees and signing to Psychopathic Records (1992–1998) ===
Starting in 1992, Jamie Spaniolo and Paul Methric were members of the Detroit hip-hop trio House of Krazees alongside Bryan Jones; they performed under the personas of Mr. Bones, Hektic, and The R.O.C. respectively. The group released five albums in the 1990s. In late 1997, House of Krazees were selected as openers, alongside Myzery, for fellow Detroit rappers Insane Clown Posse on a nationwide tour. Midway through the tour, tensions arose with Jones and the other members, and as a result House of Krazees prematurely left the tour. Jones continued using the House of Krazees name for a few years before turning to a solo career instead.

After the split, Methric and Spaniolo sent a demo tape to Insane Clown Posse member Joseph Bruce (Violent J), which also featured their friend Chris Rouleau (Blaze Ya Dead Homie), under the name ISI (Infamous Superstars Incorporated). The demo contained the tracks "2nd Hand Smoke", "Diemuthafuckadie", and "How Does It Feel?". Bruce was extremely impressed, invited Methric and Spaniolo to perform on Insane Clown Posse's House of Horrors Tour with Myzery and Psycho Realm, and signed them to Psychopathic Records. Before the tour kicked off, Bruce, Methric, and Spaniolo decided on a name that they felt would better fit the duo—"Twiztid". They also took the stage names of Monoxide Child (Methric) and Jamie Madrox (Spaniolo). In January 1998, the entire touring lineup was arrested at a Waffle House during a quarrel with a heckling customer, which had garnered the four acts media attention.

=== Mostasteless, side projects, and Freek Show (1998–2002) ===
Twiztid's debut album, Mostasteless, was originally released independently by Psychopathic Records in August 1998. A few of the tracks were conceived while the duo performed under their old personas of Mr. Bones and Hektic, while the other tracks were finished by Mike E. Clark of Psychopathic Records. When Insane Clown Posse signed with Island Records, they helped get a deal for Twiztid as well. In 1999, Mostasteless was pulled, and re-released on Island with a slightly altered tracklist and new artwork. In his review of the reissued album, AllMusic's Stephen Thomas Erlewine wrote that "[Although] the thought of a group of Insane Clown Posse protégés isn't exactly inspiring", the album "may take you by surprise...Mostasteless actually works better than most ICP records," that "Twiztid often is more convincing than [its] Dark Carnival colleagues," and concluded that "if you don't buy into the whole comic book-horror schtick, Mostasteless...will be irritating, but if you've bought into it, you'll enjoy this record as much, if not more, than most ICP albums". The reissue of Mostasteless peaked at No. 8 on the Billboard Top Heatseekers chart and at No. 149 on the Billboard 200 chart.

After the release of the Mostasteless albums, Twiztid continued to build their fanbase within the juggalo community by performing at numerous shows and being involved with associated projects. Dark Lotus was the first project that emerged, as it consisted of the then-current roster of Psychopathic Records. Although the debut album had been set for 1999 after the release of the single "Echo Side", the album was delayed and the song instead appeared on Insane Clown Posse's album The Amazing Jeckel Brothers. Another project formed was Psychopathic Rydas, which was a supergroup that consisted of Twiztid, Insane Clown Posse, Blaze Ya Dead Homie, and Myzery. The group took a satirical tone in the lyrics and used well-known gangsta rap beats as the backing music. The group's debut album was released in 1999, titled Dumpin'.

Twiztid was a headlining act at the first Gathering of the Juggalos in July 2000. The event was a success and Twiztid's presence continued for over a decade later. The duo also had made their acting debut in the comedy film Big Money Hustlas. The plot was conceived by Insane Clown Posse and Twiztid. The film was a success as the home video peaked at No. 1 on the Billboard Top Music Videos chart. On October 31, 2000, Twiztid released their second studio album, Freek Show. In his review of the album, AllMusic's Brad Mills wrote that "this kind of music appeals to a small sector of hip-hop listeners and will probably do well within [its] niche market, but the average hip-hop listener will just have to understand that this is a different kind of album". The album peaked at No. 51 on the Billboard 200 chart. Freek Show also featured producer Fritz the Cat for the first time, who the duo would work with on-and-off throughout their career. Twiztid released their first compilation album titled Cryptic Collection on November 13, 2000. It consisted of studio outtakes, cut songs from the original Mostasteless album, and 1990s tracks from the House of Krazees era.

The duo's close friend and labelmate Blaze Ya Dead Homie released his full-length debut in 2001 titled 1 Less G n da Hood. The album was notable since Twiztid was involved with nearly every track in regards to either production or vocals. In 2001, Dark Lotus had released their long-awaited debut album Tales From the Lotus Pod. Alongside Twiztid and Insane Clown Posse, Marz and Blaze Ya Dead Homie had solidified the lineup as well. The album was a success as it peaked at No. 1 on the Billboard Heatseekers chart, No. 6 on the Billboard Top Independent Albums chart, and No. 158 on the Billboard 200 chart. Shortly afterwards, Marz had left the group and was replaced by Anybody Killa, who recorded new vocals for the album's reissue in 2002.

=== Mirror Mirror and The Green Book (2002–2005) ===
In April 2002, Twiztid released their first extended play and third major release, Mirror Mirror. AllMusic reviewer Bradley Torreano praised the EP, writing that "Despite the fact that few outside of the juggalo family will give this a chance, this might be one of the most accurate portrayals of the mood of most unhappy young people in 2002". Mirror Mirror peaked at No. 5 on the Billboard Top Independent Albums chart and at No. 103 on the Billboard 200 chart. The duo then embarked on a national tour to support Mirror Mirror. Footage from the tour was incorporated into a webshow that was hosted by Twiztid titled The Purple Show, which also featured skits and backstage antics. Only four episodes were filmed for The Purple Show before its cancellation; however, it was released on DVD with extra content in early 2003.

For the 2003 version of the nationwide Van's Warped Tour, Twiztid was added to the lineup. Due to the differences in genres at the festival, Twiztid had not received a warm reception overall and they did not return to the festival for over 15 years. On July 1, 2003, Twiztid released their third studio album The Green Book. Madrox referred to the album as a "Juggalo favorite". AllMusic reviewer Rob Theakston panned the album, writing that it "is much, much better than the last ICP card record, but looking at the forest from the trees, that really isn't saying much anymore". The Green Book peaked at No. 2 on the Billboard Top Independent Albums chart and at No. 52 on the Billboard 200 chart. In October 2003, Twiztid created an annual event named Fright Fest for halloween. The event also featured Blaze Ya Dead Homie, Anybody Killa, JD Tha Weed Man, and the duo's former House of Krazees partner The R.O.C. as performers. An exclusive EP titled Fright Fest 2003 was also released to coincide with the event. Also in 2003, Twiztid had formed a short-lived record label on the side named Majik Recordz. Nothing was released on the label due to the duo's falling out with a business partner.

In 2004, Monoxide released his debut solo album Chainsmoker LP. The album charted at No. 191 on the Billboard 200 chart, No. 14 on the Billboard Top Independent Albums chart, and No. 3 on the Billboard Heatseekers chart. It had featured guests such as Blaze Ya Dead Homie, Anybody Killa, Esham, and Madrox.

=== Man's Myth (Vol. 1) and Mutant (Vol. 2) (2005–2007) ===
Twiztid released their fourth full-length album Man's Myth (Vol. 1) on June 28, 2005. Man's Myth (Vol. 1) was the first half of a double album which concluded with the release of Mutant (Vol. 2) one month later. While Man's Myth (Vol. 1) featured a hip-hop-oriented sound, Mutant (Vol. 2) featured a rock oriented sound. According to Madrox, "I've always wanted to do a rock album and to date that was the closest thing to it we have ever done, so it holds a special place in my heart." Man's Myth (Vol. 1) peaked at No. 4 on the Billboard Top Independent Albums chart, No. 14 on the Billboard Top Rap Albums chart, and No. 62 on the Billboard 200 chart. Mutant (Vol. 2) peaked at No. 11 on the Billboard Top Independent Albums chart, No. 20 on the Billboard Top Rap Albums chart, and No. 80 on the Billboard 200 chart. Ultimately, Man's Myth (Vol. 1) was commercially and critically more successful than Mutant (Vol. 2).

In 2006, Madrox released his debut solo album Phatso. The album charted at No. 107 on the Billboard 200 chart, No. 3 on the Billboard Top Independent Albums chart, and No. 1 on the Billboard Heatseekers chart. A second version of the album was also released, titled Phatso (The Earth 2 Version), which featured remixes and new skits.

=== Independents Day, chart success with W.I.C.K.E.D., and Heartbroken & Homicidal (2007–2011) ===
On July 4, 2007, Twiztid released their sixth full-length studio album Independents Day. The album featured guest appearances from rappers signed to independent record labels, such as The Dayton Family, Tha Dogg Pound, Hed PE frontman Jared Gomes, Tech N9ne, and Krizz Kaliko. It also notably featured appearances by D12 members Proof and Bizarre. One of the group's members, Eminem, had feuded with Insane Clown Posse since the late 1990s and thus the collaboration was noteworthy. The album peaked at No. 4 on the Billboard Top Independent Albums chart, No. 9 on the Billboard Top Rap Albums chart, and No. 57 on the Billboard 200 chart. In September 2007, the group's Toxic Terror Tour was cancelled after Monoxide suffered a torn anterior cruciate ligament following a car accident, but the tour was booked again in early 2008. A promotional EP titled Toxic Terror was released during the tour as well.

On March 17, 2009, Twiztid released their seventh full-length studio album W.I.C.K.E.D. (short for "Wish I Could Kill Every Day"). W.I.C.K.E.D. was Twiztid's highest-charting album, peaking at No. 11 on the Billboard 200 chart, No. 4 on the Billboard Top Rap Albums chart, and No. 1 on the Billboard Top Independent Albums chart. W.I.C.K.E.D. became the third-highest-charting album in Psychopathic Records history, after Insane Clown Posse's The Amazing Jeckel Brothers and Bang! Pow! Boom!, both of which peaked at No. 4 on the Billboard 200 chart. During their End of Days Tour to promote W.I.C.K.E.D., the duo released a promotional EP titled End of Days.

Twiztid released Heartbroken & Homicidal on September 21, 2010. Monoxide had produced or co-produced the vast majority of the songs alongside Brian Kuma and Eric Davie. The album had extensive packaging, such as the 28-page booklet that resembled a notebook, with the liner notes written in invisible ink. The casing included a black pencil which was used to reveal the album's liner notes, which was also visible under a black light. The album peaked at No. 3 on both the Billboard Top Rap Albums and Billboard Top Independent Albums charts.

=== Abominationz, leaving Psychopathic Records, and A New Nightmare (2011–2014) ===
On April 18, 2012, both Madrox and Monoxide were interviewed on Strange Music's BlogTalkRadio. During the interview, they released the new album title, Abominationz. It was eventually released on October 22, 2012. It had charted highly as it peaked at No. 2 on the Billboard Top Rap Albums chart, No. 4 on the Billboard Top Independent Albums chart, and No. 18 on the Billboard 200 chart. The album was mostly produced by Strange Music's in-house producer Seven, which was the beginning of a close musical relationship with the duo. Abominationz was Twiztid's last release under Psychopathic Records, as they left the label in December 2012. Blaze Ya Dead Homie followed soon afterwards. It was noted that there was no animosity, and Twiztid had simply wished to explore new ventures since they had been with Psychopathic Records for 15 years at that point. Besides Insane Clown Posse, Twiztid had the longest tenure on the label, more than any other artist that was signed.

Upon leaving Psychopathic Records, Twiztid had not initially announced any label plans; thus, they stayed as an unsigned act. The duo released A New Nightmare on July 30, 2013. Classified as either a mixtape or EP, it was Twiztid's 11th major studio release overall. The album peaked at No. 17 on the Billboard Top Rap Albums chart. In regards to other Twiztid albums, A New Nightmare had the largest amount of featured performers, such as Blaze Ya Dead Homie, JellyRoll, Wrekonize, Caskey, Johnny Richter, Swollen Members, The R.O.C., and others.

=== Creation of Majik Ninja Entertainment, The Darkness, and The Continuous Evilution of Life's ?s (2014–2017) ===
Twiztid and Blaze Ya Dead Homie reunited with Insane Clown Posse for the Dark Lotus album The Mud, Water, Air & Blood in 2014. It was the supergroup's highest-charting release as it peaked at No. 43 on the Billboard 200 chart. Also in 2014, Twiztid announced that they would form their own record label titled Majik Ninja Entertainment (MNE for short). They had also dubbed their in-house studio as "The Dojo". On October 21, 2014, Blaze Ya Dead Homie released his fifth full-length album titled Gang Rags: Reborn. The album signified the creation of MNE as it was the label's first overall release. Twiztid released their next album The Darkness in early 2015, and it was MNE's second release. The album peaked at No. 3 on the Billboard Top Rap Albums chart and at No. 29 on the Billboard 200 chart. Towards the end of 2015, Twiztid recruited a backing band for their live shows, named The Wickedness. The members consisted of keyboardist Tiffany Lowe (Combichrist), guitarist Rocky Sobon (Ventana), and drummer Sean "Drayven" Davidson (Static-X/Davey Suicide). The Wickedness performed with Twiztid at various dates in 2015 and 2016, but Lowe and Sobon eventually departed from the band. Davidson then continued to be employed as Twiztid's drummer both live and in the studio.

From Twiztid and Blaze Ya Dead Homie's Psychopathic Records departure in 2012 up until 2016, they had continued to perform at the annual Gathering of the Juggalos. The 2016 event featured a prominent presence by MNE, as each artist released an EP at the event; Twiztid with Trapped, Blaze Ya Dead Homie with Dead Vulture, The R.O.C. with The Fucking Prey Lewd, and Lex "The Hex" Master with Mr. Ugly. Shortly afterwards, Twiztid released their 2003 album The Green Book on vinyl for the first time. The reissue notably peaked at No. 1 on the Billboard Vinyl Albums chart, and it garnered the duo their first nomination at the Detroit Music Awards (in the "Outstanding Anthology/Compilation/Reissue" category).

At the end of 2016, it was revealed that former Psychopathic Records recording artist and in-house producer Young Wicked had joined the MNE label under controversial circumstances. The signing had permanently severed all of Twiztid's ties to Psychopathic Records and Insane Clown Posse, including appearances at the Gathering of the Juggalos, studio collaborations, and tour plans. In January 2017, Twiztid released The Continuous Evilution of Life's ?s. The album peaked at No. 28 on the Billboard 200 chart, and it notably appeared on seven different Billboard charts (the most in Twiztid's career up to that point). Blaze Ya Dead Homie and Twiztid also released an album titled Triple Threat on September 1, 2017. The trio's name stemmed from the song "Triple Threat" off of 2005's Mutant (Vol. 2) album.

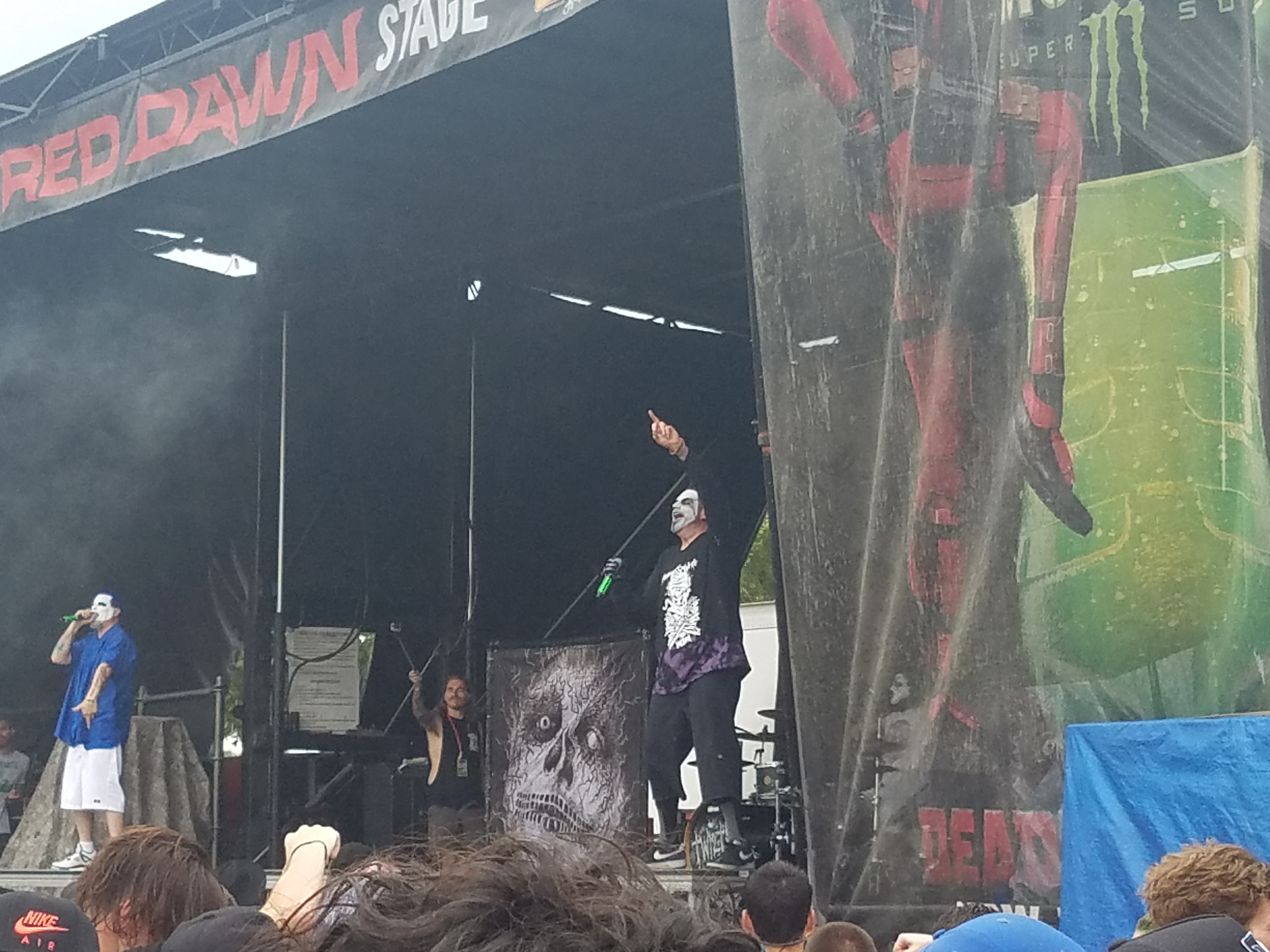
Twiztid performing in 2018

=== Other ventures, Generation Nightmare, unexpected release with Mad Season, and Revelashen (2017–2021) ===
In early 2018, Twiztid hosted the first Astronomicon event. Astronomicon was focused on video games, horror films, comic books, and musical acts. Special guests included professional wrestlers such as Booker T, Scott Hall, Eric Bischoff, and Brother Love; horror icons such as Bill Moseley, Kane Hodder, and Tony Moran; comedic actors such as Brian O'Halloran and Jason Mewes; and metal musicians such as Carla Harvey. The event was a success as it was turned into a yearly event afterwards. Twiztid also announced a comic book series titled Haunted High-Ons, written by Dirk Manning. The project was revealed alongside a Kickstarter campaign.

Twiztid was invited to join Van's Warped Tour for the 2018 cycle, 15 years after the duo's last appearance. Due to the more positive reception than their 2003 appearance, they were invited back the following year; however, the 2019 cycle ended up being the final Van's Warped Tour since it was then retired as an entity.

On April 26, 2019, Twiztid released their 12th full-length studio album Generation Nightmare, a more rock-oriented album than most of their previous releases. Generation Nightmare had featured the most variety of producers on a singular Twiztid album to that point, with seven different producers overall. It peaked at No. 3 on the Billboard Top Independent Albums chart and at No. 51 on the Billboard 200 chart.

On April 20, 2020, Twiztid released their 13th full-length studio album Mad Season on their online web store without any prior promotion. A few days later, the album was made available on streaming services. The duo returned to a more horrorcore sound with a hip-hop approach on Mad Season. Due to the lack of promotion, the album had found only minimal success as it peaked at No. 38 on the Billboard Top Independent Albums chart.

On November 23, 2020, Twiztid announced their next album would be titled Revelashen. Similar to Mad Season, it received very little promotion or hype, and it was released merely four days after the announcement. In regards to prior albums, Revelashen was not as successful since it only appeared on one chart, the Billboard Top Current Album Sales chart, peaking at No. 57. Revelashen was more straightforward in its content, with the duo shredding the theatrical storylines and moving away from strictly horror themes.

=== Unlikely Prescription and Glyph (2021–2023) ===
Twiztid released the promotional EP Electric Lettuce on April 20, 2021, as it coincided with a 4:20 livestream event. Twiztid also formed another supergroup in 2021 named Eastside Ninjas, which featured the duo, Blaze Ya Dead Homie, and Anybody Killa. Their debut album Pact of the 4 was released on June 5, 2021. Also in early 2021, Twiztid released the single "Rose Petal". It appeared on the Billboard Mainstream Rock chart for over two months, peaking at No. 32. It was the duo's first appearance on a singles chart. Another single was released in May 2021 as a collaboration with Ice Nine Kills titled "Envy". It was the duo's second appearance on the Billboard Mainstream Rock chart, peaking at No. 32 in October 2021 and staying on the chart for 15 weeks overall. The song (and the aforementioned "Rose Petal" single) later appeared on Unlikely Prescription, their rock-oriented album that was released on September 10, 2021. Unlikely Prescription peaked at No. 14 on the Billboard Top Current Album Sales chart and, because of the duo's venture into the rock genre, at No. 20 on the Billboard Top Hard Rock Albums chart, which was their first appearance on the chart.

On November 28, 2022, Twiztid surprise-released an album entitled Glyph. It was exclusively released through their webstore on physical CD with no prior notice. It was added onto streaming services two months later, although Glyph ultimately became the first Twiztid album to not appear on any Billboard chart.

=== Return to solo albums and Welcome to Your Funeral (2023–present) ===
Monoxide released his second solo album on February 29, 2024, titled Chainsmoker II. It arrived nearly 20 years after his previous solo album, 2004's Chainsmoker, and also became the first solo album from Twiztid in 18 years (since Madrox's Phatso in 2006). Madrox's second solo album, The November Brain, was also released later that same year. Madrox released an additional solo album on January 31, 2025 as well, named More Music You Don't Wanna Hear From Someone You Barely Like.

At 2024's Astronomicon, Twiztid confirmed that their rock-oriented album with producer Zeuss (who has worked with Rob Zombie, Earth Crisis, Hatebreed, Chimaira, among other rock/metal artists) was due for release in 2024, entitled Welcome to Your Funeral. A picture disc vinyl was revealed for the album's first single. It was later announced that the album's release date was delayed to 2025 in order to coincide with a rescheduled tour alongside Coal Chamber. The tour with Coal Chamber was subsequently cancelled due to health issues with the band's frontman, but Twiztid kept February 14, 2025 as Welcome to Your Funeral's release date. In 2026, Twiztid, Blaze Ya Dead Homie, and Anybody Killa released the album Return of the Lotus under the group name Certified Psychos. It was promoted and sometimes billed as a continuation of Dark Lotus, which garnered a mixed response due to the absence of Insane Clown Posse. All four members had previously collaborated together in 2021 for the album Pact of the 4, albeit under the name Eastside Ninjas.

== Style and influences ==
Spaniolo described his lyrical style by saying, "Think of it as if there was a Halloween or Friday the 13th on wax, and Jason and Michael Myers could actually rap, this is what their vibe would sound like". Twiztid's lyrics draw from themes which include anger, hate, disgust, obsession, and infidelity. The lyrics also include elements of dark humor, including gallows humor. AllMusic writer Torreano wrote that Twiztid's songs are "teenage anthems that actually have more than a passing similarity" to the songs of Detroit rapper Eminem, and that Twiztid's lyrics "[accurately portray] the mood of most unhappy young people". Spaniolo, a fan of comic books, often references comics in his lyrics; his stage name is taken from the Marvel Comics superhero "The Multiple Man" Jamie Madrox, and he has made reference to "The Multiple Man" nickname in Twiztid's songs. Twiztid's style has been described as horrorcore, hip-hop, rap rock, and rap metal. Starting with their Abominationz album, Twiztid adopted a faster rapping style which allowed the duo to write more lyrics for the album than previous efforts.

Spaniolo has stated that the earliest musical influence on him was the rock band Kiss, which led to him discovering the hair metal bands Ratt, Cinderella, Twisted Sister, and Mötley Crüe's album Shout at the Devil. Methric was more of a hip-hop fan and Spaniolo was more into rock music when the duo were younger, with the latter stating, "I’m the guy that likes The Beatles or Frank Sinatra." After Methric finally persuaded Spaniolo to listen to Run-DMC, the group's Raising Hell album became the first rap album Spaniolo ever purchased, and led to him discovering N.W.A's Straight Outta Compton and becoming a serious fan of the genre. The duo has stated that they are collectively influenced by Rob Zombie, Sully Erna, Chester Bennington, Black Sabbath, Marilyn Manson, Ronnie James Dio, Alice in Chains, Seether, Bullet for My Valentine, Korn, Mudvayne, Papa Roach, P.O.D., Slipknot, Five Finger Death Punch, and Bring Me the Horizon.

== Members ==
Although Jamie Madrox and Monoxide Child are considered the core of Twiztid, various members have been associated with the duo as backing musicians. The first incarnation of their backing band was named The Wickedness.

- Jamie Madrox - vocals (1997–present)
- Monoxide Child - vocals (1997–present)
- Daniel "Lil' Dan" Fox - drums (2025–present)
- Derek Obscura - guitars (2025–present)
- Sean "Drayven" Davidson - drums (2015–2025)
- Rocky Sobon - guitars (2015–2016)
- Tiffany Lowe - keyboards (2015–2016)

== Discography ==
- Mostasteless (1998)
- Freek Show (2000)
- Mirror Mirror (2002)
- The Green Book (2003)
- Man's Myth (Vol. 1) (2005)
- Mutant (Vol. 2) (2005)
- Independents Day (2007)
- W.I.C.K.E.D. (2009)
- Heartbroken & Homicidal (2010)
- Abominationz (2012)
- A New Nightmare (2013)
- The Darkness (2015)
- The Continuous Evilution of Life's ?s (2017)
- Generation Nightmare (2019)
- Mad Season (2020)
- Revelashen (2020)
- Unlikely Prescription (2021)
- Glyph (2022)
- Welcome to Your Funeral (2025)

== Awards and nominations ==
Year	Nominee / work	Award	Result	Ref.
2017	The Green Book	Detroit Music Award for Outstanding Anthology/Compilation/Reissue	Nominated	
2018	Twiztid	Detroit Music Award for Outstanding Rap Producer	Nominated	
2018	The Continuous Evilution of Life's ?s	Detroit Music Award for Outstanding Rap Recording	Nominated	
