= Chainsmoker LP =

Studio album by Monoxide
- Released: November 16, 2004
- Studios: The Lotus Pod (Detroit, Michigan)
- Genres: Underground hip hop; horrorcore
- Length: 41:38
- Label: Psychopathic Records
- Producers: Fritz "The Cat" Van Kosky; J-Ha; Monoxide Child; Esham

Monoxide chronology
Chainsmoker LP (2004)	Chainsmoker II (2024)

Professional ratings
Review scores
Source	Rating
AllMusic	2/5 stars

Chainsmoker LP is the debut solo studio album by American rapper Monoxide Child. It was released on November 16, 2004, through Psychopathic Records in the United States and on November 29, 2004, through Method Recordings in Australia. Recording sessions took place at the Lotus Pod in Detroit. Among Monoxide, production was handled by Fritz "The Cat" Van Kosky, J-Ha and Esham. It features guest appearances from Anybody Killa, Esham, Jamie Madrox and Kash Kola.

The album peaked at number 191 on the Billboard 200, at #14 on the Independent Albums and #3 on the Heatseekers Albums in the United States.

== Track listing ==
No.	Title	Writer(s)	Producer(s)	Length
1.	"Lite It Up"	P. Methric	J-Ha	1:07
2.	"Drive Thru"	P. Methric		2:21
3.	"See Me"	P. Methric	J-Ha	3:41
4.	"Wut Would You Do"	P. Methric	Fritz The Cat	3:04
5.	"Blaze"	P. Methric	J-Ha	3:10
6.	"Outta My Way" (featuring Esham)	P. Methric; E. Smith	Fritz The Cat	3:37
7.	"Bring Me Down"	P. Methric	Fritz The Cat	3:33
8.	"I'm Out"	P. Methric; F. Vankosky	Fritz The Cat; Monoxide Child	1:59
9.	"Slut"	P. Methric	J-Ha	2:40
10.	"Rite Quick"	P. Methric	Fritz The Cat; J-Ha; Monoxide Child; Esham	1:43
11.	"Shoe Fitz" (featuring Anybody Killa and Kash Kola)	P. Methric; J. Lowery; J. Evelyn	J-Ha	3:21
12.	"Change"	P. Methric	Fritz The Cat	3:57
13.	"Evil" (featuring Jamie Madrox and Anybody Killa)	P. Methric; J. Lowery; J. Spaniolo	Fritz The Cat	3:40
14.	"That's Real"	P. Methric	Fritz The Cat	3:38
Total length:				41:38

== Personnel ==
- Paul "Monoxide" Methric – main artist, producer (tracks: 5, 8, 10), arranger (tracks: 1, 2, 8), mixing (tracks: 1–13)
- Esham Attica Smith – featured artist (track 6), producer & mixing (track 10)
- James Lowery – featured artist (tracks: 11, 13)
- J. "Kash Kola" Evelyn – featured artist (track 11)
- Jamie "Madrox" Spaniolo – featured artist (track 13)
- Chris Rouleau – additional vocals (track 5)
- Emily "Sev" Elev – additional vocals (track 5)
- Fritz "The Cat" Van Kosky – producer (tracks: 4–8, 10–14), arranger (tracks: 1, 2, 8), mixing
- J-Ha – producer (tracks: 1, 3, 9–11), mixing (tracks: 4, 6, 10–12)
- M. Scotta – design, layout

== Charts ==
Chart (2004)	Peak position
US Billboard 200	191
US Independent Albums (Billboard)	14
US Heatseekers Albums (Billboard)	3
