= Wicked (Twiztid album) =

W.I.C.K.E.D.

Studio album by Twiztid
- Released: March 17, 2009
- Recorded: 2008–2009
- Genres: Horrorcore; rap rock
- Length: 57:20
- Label: Psychopathic Records
- Producers: Eric Davie, Underrated, Brian Kuma, Monoxide Child

Twiztid chronology
Independents Day (2007)	W.I.C.K.E.D. (2009)	Heartbroken & Homicidal (2010)

W.I.C.K.E.D. (short for Wish I Could Kill Every Day) is the seventh studio album by American hip hop duo Twiztid. Released on March 17, 2009, it is the group's highest-charting album, peaking at #11 on the Billboard 200. The album is also the fourth-highest-charting album in Psychopathic Records history, beaten only by Insane Clown Posse's The Amazing Jeckel Brothers, Bang! Pow! Boom!, and The Mighty Death Pop!, all of which peaked at #4.

== Production ==
Soon after the album title was released, it was revealed in the new year's edition of the Weekly Freeekly Weekly that Eric Davie would be producing the album.

== Release ==
W.I.C.K.E.D. was released in three different versions. Best Buy and iTunes sold an exclusive version with three additional tracks. Hot Topic sold a version with a comic based on the song "Bella Morte" included, and a third version sold at various music stores included an enhanced disk including music videos for the songs "Buckets of Blood" and "Ha Ha Ha Ha Ha Ha". Psychopathic Records' store Hatchetgear will be selling all three versions, in addition to a standard version without any extras. All versions come with one of ten Psychopathic Records Trading Card. The album leaked two weeks prior to its release.

W.I.C.K.E.D. is currently Twiztid's highest-charting album, peaking at #11 on the Billboard 200, #4 on the Top Rap Albums chart, #1 on the Top Independent Albums chart and #1 on the Top Internet Albums chart. W.I.C.K.E.D. is the third-highest-charting album in Psychopathic Records history, after Insane Clown Posse's The Amazing Jeckel Brothers and Bang! Pow! Boom!, both of which peaked at #4. Twiztid stated in a December 4, 2014, interview that they plan to rerelease the album as well as Abominationz.

On May 13, 2015, it was announced that Twiztid has acquired the rights to W.I.C.K.E.D., and will release the album on a blood red double vinyl on August 21, 2015.

== Reception ==
Professional ratings
Review scores
Source	Rating
Allmusic	3.5/5 stars
horroryearbook	(favorable)

Allmusic reviewer David Jeffries praised the album, writing "This is a serious step up from their previous album, the inconsistent Independent's Day, and an obvious favorite for those who like their Psychopathic releases to be less street, more theatrical." horroryearbook reviewer Brain Hammer described it as Twiztid's best album, writing "It stands out to me as the most original record they have done, and it has the most horror influence too. Horror fans who have never checked out Twiztid in the past should give this record a spin."

== Track listing ==
All tracks are written by Twiztid.

No.	Title	Producer(s)	Length
1.	"W.I.C.K.E.D." (additional vocals by Ashley Heidrich)	Eric Davie & Monoxide (co.)	2:32
2.	"Kill With Us"	Eric Davie, Monoxide (co.) & Justin Ruffin (Guitars)	2:00
3.	"Buckets Of Blood"	Underrated from Potluck for Lost Koast Productions	3:59
4.	"Ha Ha Ha Ha Ha Ha"	Eric Davie & DJ Clay (Scratching)	4:24
5.	"Death Note"	Eric Davie & Monoxide (co.)	4:43
6.	"Krossroads Inn" (additional vocals by Ashley Heidrich & Simms Welden)	Eric Davie	5:04
7.	"All Of The Above" (additional vocals by Blaze Ya Dead Homie & Ashley Heidrich)	Eric Davie, Brian Kuma (co.) & Willie E. (Guitars)	4:28
8.	"Killing Season" (additional vocals by Blaze Ya Dead Homie & Ashley Heidrich)	Eric Davie	3:24
9.	"Whoop - Whoop" (additional vocals by Blaze Ya Dead Homie)	Seven, Monoxide (co.) & DJ Clay (Scratching)	2:54
10.	"That's Wicked"	Eric Davie	2:55
11.	"They Told Me"	Eric Davie & Monoxide (co.)	3:02
12.	"My Enemies"	Monoxide, Eric Davie (co.) & Justin Ruffin (Guitars)	3:29
13.	"Bella Morte" (additional vocals by Ashley Heidrich)	Monoxide, Eric Davie (co.) & Randy Lynch (Guitars)	4:21
14.	"When I Get To Hell" (additional vocals by Blaze Ya Dead Homie)	Eric Davie & Monoxide (co.)	4:49
15.	"Woe Woe" (additional vocals by Blaze Ya Dead Homie & Ashley Heidrich)	Eric Davie, Brian Kuma, Monoxide (co.) & Randy Lynch (Guitars)	5:15
Total length:			57:20

Best Buy & iTunes bonus tracks
No.	Title	Length
16.	"Catch The Show"	3:05
17.	"Gothic Chick"	3:51
18.	"It Don't Stop"	2:57

F.Y.E. DVD
No.	Title	Length
1.	"Buckets Of Blood (Music Video)"	04:44
2.	"Ha Ha Ha Ha Ha Ha (Music Video)"	03:50

== Personnel ==
Information taken from Allmusic.

- Entire Album Written By Twiztid
- Production Was Handled By Eric Davie, Monoxide, Lost Koast Productions, Micheal "Seven" Summers and Brian Kuma
- Director Of Photography: E-Wolf
- Guitars By Randy Lynch, Justin Ruffin and Willie E.
- Scratching By DJ Clay
- Production Designer: Jim Neve
- Additional Graphics By Brian Debler
- Additional Vocals By Ashley Heidrich, Blaze Ya Dead Homie, Leach Compagnoni and Simms Welden
- "Belle Morte" Model: Marsida Cami

== Charts ==
Chart (2009)	Peak Position
Billboard 200	11
Top Independent Albums	1
Top Rap Albums	4
