= House of Krazees =

American hip-hop group

- Origin: Detroit, Michigan, United States
- Genre: Horrorcore
- Years active: 1992–1997; 2024–present
- Labels: Majik Ninja; Latnem
- Spinoffs: Twiztid
- Members: The R.O.C. Mr. Bones; Hektic

House of Krazees is an American hip-hop group from Detroit, Michigan. Known for their horrorcore style, they rose to prominence as part of the Detroit hip-hop scene in the 1990s. They were signed to Latnem Entertainment, initially releasing their music exclusively on Compact Cassette. Following a dispute with Latnem, members Mr. Bones and Hektic split from House of Krazees and formed the duo Twiztid. In 2024, the R.O.C. reunited with the group to release 31, their first album of new material since 1996.

== History ==
House of Krazees was formed by friends Bryan Jones, Paul Methric and Jamie Spaniolo out of a shared love of horror films and hip-hop. Jones adopted the stage name R.O.C., Methric performed as EXP and Spaniolo as Big J. Methric and Spaniolo later changed their names to Hektic and Mr. Bones respectively. House of Krazees' catalog was only released on Compact Cassette until the group signed to Latnem Entertainment. They released their debut album, Home Sweet Home, in 1993.

Problems between House of Krazees and Latnem led the group to leave the label following its 1996 album, Head Trauma. That year, the group was scheduled to tour with Insane Clown Posse and Myzery, serving as an opening act for ICP. The tour was cancelled after Insane Clown Posse was dropped by Hollywood Records. Methric and Spaniolo left House of Krazees in 1997, due to conflicts with the group's manager, Walter Stepanenko, and later formed the duo Twiztid. In 2024, House of Krazees released 31, their first album of all-new material since 1996.

== Discography ==
- Home Sweet Home (1993)
- Home Bound (1994)
- Season of the Pumpkin (1994)
- Out Breed (1995)
- Head Trauma (1996)
- Collector's Edition '97 (1997)
- The Night They Came Home (1999)
- Casket Cutz (2013)
- Post Apocalyptic World (2018)
- 31 (2024)
