= Jamie Madrox (rapper) =

American rapper (born 1975)

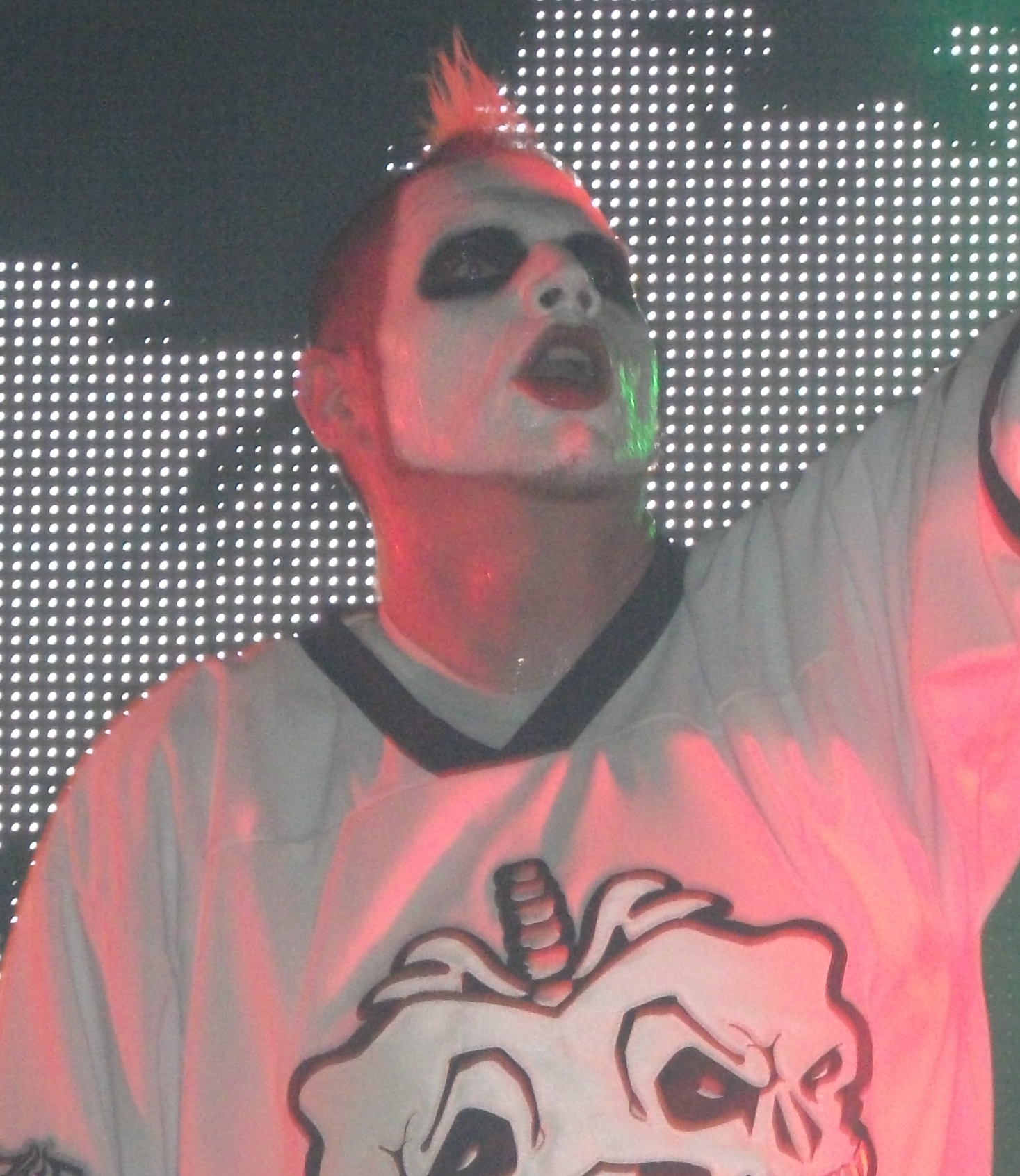
- Madrox performing in Chesterfield, Michigan in April 2013

Background information
- Also known as: The Phatso, The Multiple Man, Lil Shank, Mr. Bones, Big Stank
- Born: Jamie Michael Spaniolo; November 5, 1975 (age 50)
- Origin: Detroit, Michigan, U.S.
- Genres: Hip hop; horrorcore; rap rock; rap metal
- Occupations: Rapper, Actor
- Years active: 1992–present
- Labels: Majik Ninja Entertainment; Majik Recordz; Psychopathic; Latnem Entertainment
- Member of: House of Krazees; Twiztid
- Formerly of: Dark Lotus; Psychopathic Rydas
- Website: twiztid.com

Jamie Michael Spaniolo (born November 5, 1975), known professionally as Jamie Madrox, is an American rapper from Detroit, Michigan, and performs as a member of the hip hop groups Twiztid and House of Krazees. Spaniolo's stage name is a reference to Marvel Comics's character Multiple Man.

== Early life ==
Jamie Spaniolo began rapping as a teenager while he was in highschool. Shortly after, his parents adopted Zachary Potter, making him Spaniolo's brother and only sibling. In school, Spaniolo and friend Paul Methric would freestyle with other kids, though the two felt they were never great at promptly coming up with rhymes. Both recall going to school with late-rapper Proof and seeing him freestyle, describing him as "the mecca of freestyling". Spaniolo and Methric also participated in freestyle battles at the Hip Hop Shop on a weekly basis.

== Musical career ==
=== House of Krazees (1992–1997, 2013-present) ===
Spaniolo started his musical career in 1992 as an original member of House of Krazees under the pseudonym Big-J changing it to Mr. Bones after the first album. Along with Hektic and The R.O.C., the original House of Krazees released five albums between 1993 and 1996. Problems with the group's label, Latnem Entertainment, led The R.O.C. to leave, and House of Krazees disbanded.

However, they reunited on the song "Monstrosity" off of Twiztid's A New Nightmare EP in 2013.

=== Solo career (1994-present) ===
In 1994, Spaniolo released his first solo EP, The Demon Inside, under the name Mr. Bones. He followed up with the LP Sacrifice in 1995. Spaniolo's debut solo album under the name Jamie Madrox, Phatso, was released in 2006. A week after the release, a special tour-edition album, Phatso: The Earth 2 Version, came out and featured remixed songs from the original album as well as new songs. According to Twiztid's Twitter page, Spaniolo re released Sacrifice during the Slaughterhouse tour.

=== Twiztid (1997–present) ===
After receiving an offer from Insane Clown Posse to join Psychopathic Records in 1998, Spaniolo and Methric accepted and reemerged as Twiztid. Upon signing with the label, the duo revamped their image, and set out to prove themselves to the Juggalo fanbase. Twiztid opened shows for Insane Clown Posse. In 1998, Twiztid's debut album, Mostasteless, was released. With the release, a shift in reaction toward Twiztid occurred, and Juggalos slowly began to receive the duo well. Twiztid, however, continued to open for Insane Clown Posse and appear with them at in-store tours, improving their rapport with the fanbase.

In 1999, Insane Clown Posse persuaded Island Records to sign Twiztid. During Twiztid's brief stint with the label, Mostasteless was pulled from shelves and re-released under Island Records. The following year, the duo went back to Psychopathic Records and released Freek Show. Freek Show debuted at #51 on Billboard charts, and Twiztid's fanbase grew immensely. Twiztid remained with Psychopathic Records until 2012, and have helped to sign artists Blaze Ya Dead Homie and The R.O.C to the label. The duo's 2009 album, W.I.C.K.E.D., peaked at #11 on the Billboard 200. With the position, Spaniolo says that "it shows relevance. It shows that [we're] not just a sideshow act. It shows that we're not just protoges, we're not just coattail riders. We are here."

On December 12 it was announced via Twiztid's official Twitter that Twiztid has left Psychopathic Records. The duo released a couple of albums independently at first, and have since created their own label, Majik Ninja Entertainment.

=== Dark Lotus (1999–2017) ===
Formed in 1999, Dark Lotus consists of Joseph Bruce and Joseph Utsler of Insane Clown Posse, Jamie Spaniolo and Paul Methric of Twiztid, and Chris Rouleau. Each member is said to "act as a 'petal' of the lotus," and it was announced that there would be six members. But after the first album released there was a problem with Dark Lotus and Marz so they re-released the first album where AnyBody Killa took over Marz place.

=== Psychopathic Rydas (1999–2017) ===
Psychopathic Rydas formed in 1999, and consists of Psychopathic Records-associated rappers performing under alternate stage names in the style of mainstream gangsta rap. The group's lineup consisted of Bruce (Bullet), Utsler (Full Clip), Methric (Foe Foe), Spaniolo (Lil' Shank), Rouleau (Cell Block) and James Lowery (Sawed Off).

Psychopathic Rydas reuses the beats of popular rappers within the genre without paying to license the original songs or requesting permission from copyright owners to use the music, effectively making their albums bootlegs and resulting in the releases becoming difficult to find in some markets.

== Style and influences ==
Spaniolo has cited the rock band Kiss as an influence, noting that "I was too little to understand it was all about sex and women – I just [saw] the face paint, pyro, and rock riffs." He has said, "I've always wanted to do a Rock album and to date [the Twiztid album] Mutant was the closest thing to it we have ever done, so it holds a special place in my heart." Spaniolo has stated that being a fan of Kiss led to him discovering the hair metal bands Ratt, Cinderella and Twisted Sister, and Mötley Crüe's album Shout at the Devil. Monoxide was more of a hip hop fan and Jamie Madrox was more into rock music when the duo were younger, with the latter stating, "I'm the guy that likes The Beatles or Frank Sinatra." After Monoxide finally persuaded Jamie Madrox to listen to Run-DMC, the group's Raising Hell album became the first rap album Jamie Madrox ever purchased, and led to him discovering N.W.A's Straight Outta Compton and becoming a serious fan of the genre.

His interests in both horror movies and comic books have also had a major influence on his music. Spaniolo describes his work in Twiztid "as if there was a Halloween or Friday the 13th on wax and Jason and Michael Myers could actually rap." His stage name is taken from the Marvel Comics superhero "The Multiple Man" Jamie Madrox, and he has made reference to "The Multiple Man" nickname in song. The special tour-edition of his album Phatso was titled Phatso: The Earth 2 Version, alluding to the parallel world in the DC Multiverse Earth-Two.

== Wrestling career ==
James Spaniolo
Personal information
- Born: November 5, 1975 (age 50)

Professional wrestling career
- Ring name(s): "Lucious" Johnny Stark; Jamie Madrox
- Billed from: Detroit, Michigan
- Trained by: Self-Trained; Tommy Starr
- Debut: 1999

=== Beginning (1999) ===
In 1999, Insane Clown Posse began a stint in the World Wrestling Federation (WWF). The duo brought Spaniolo and Methric along with them to shows backstage, being fans of wrestling themselves. After Insane Clown Posse left the WWF, they started a wrestling tour called the "Hellfire Wrestling" tour. Again, both Spaniolo and Methric were brought along backstage.

=== Commentary (1999–2007) ===
On November 23, 1999, Stranglemania, Vol. 2 was released. Alongside commentators "Handsome" Harley Guestella and Diamond Donovan Douglas, Spaniolo debuted as color commentator "Lucious" Johnny Stark. The following year, Juggalo Championship Wrestling released JCW Vol. 1, and featured Guestella, Douglas, and Stark on commentary. The trio continued to commentate on JCW Vol. 2 and JCW Vol. 3. On May 19, 2007, "Lucious" Johnny Stark contributed commentary to the sixth episode of SlamTV!, filling in for Diamond Donovan Douglas who had laryngitis.

=== Professional wrestling (1998–2003) ===
On December 19, 1999, both Spaniolo and Methric participated in the first "Juggalo Championship Wrestling" event. As Jamie Madrox and Monoxide Child, they were featured in a 20-man battle royal to crown the first JCW Heavyweight Champion, which was won by Evil Dead. Spaniolo and Methric continued to sporadically wrestle for JCW until 2003. Both are untrained and have had several wrestlers show them moves backstage at shows. When asked in a 2009 interview if they were planning on returning to wrestling, Spaniolo replied, "No, we're not wrestlers. Every time we step into the ring, something bad happens. Either somebody gets hurt, or we get hurt ... There are things in life that you're good at, and not good at. [We're] not good at [wrestling]." He added that they will stick to simply watching wrestling.

== Personal life ==
Madrox is married with two daughters. Spaniolo is a fan of horror movies, citing the Halloween series and the Rob Zombie remake, the Friday the 13th series and the 2009 remake, The Evil Dead and Evil Dead II, The Funhouse, and Night of the Demons among his favorites. He also enjoys the use of supernatural styles in films. Spaniolo hosts a section on the Twiztid website called "At the Movies with Madrox" in which he reviews recently released movies. He himself has an interest in getting into acting as well, and currently has gigs booked as typecast and background characters.

He is a fan of comic books, and has attended conventions such as Wizard World Chicago. Spaniolo has noted that, "I'm big into horror comics, regular comics, horror cinema, the toys, models, I love that shit. It's the fabric of what I grew up on." He has made references to comic books in his lyrics. Twiztid's internet radio show for WFKO (now airing on Psychopathic Radio) is called Ashtrays and Action Figures, alluding to Methric's love of cigarettes and Spaniolo's passion for collector items and memorabilia.

Spaniolo is a fan of professional wrestling, and enjoys wrestling of the 1980s the most. He is a playable character in Eidos Interactive's video game Backyard Wrestling: Don't Try This at Home as Jamie Madrox.

Spaniolo was arrested in Tampa, Florida on October 23, 2011, at the Days Inn on Dale Mabry Highway for possession of cannabis and possession of drug paraphernalia. Police found 110.6 grams of marijuana in total. Spaniolo, Methric (Monoxide), Rouleau (Blaze), and Picklez were released on a $2,500 bond each.

== Discography ==
- Sacrifice (1995; as Mr. Bones)
- Phatso (2006)
- The November Rain (2024)

== Filmography ==
- Big Money Hustlas (2000), as Big Stank
- Born Twiztid: Behind The Freekshow (2000), as Jamie Madrox
- A Family Underground (2009), as Jamie Madrox
- Big Money Rustlas (2010), as Raw Stank

== Group membership ==
- House of Krazees as Mr. Bones (1992–1997, 2013–present)
- International Superstars Incorporated (1997)
- Twiztid (1997–present)
- Dark Lotus (1998–2017)
- Psychopathic Rydas as Lil Shank (1999–2017)
- Samhein Witch Killaz (2005–2009)
- Triple Threat (2005–present)
- Venomous 5 (2018–present)

== Television and internet programs ==
- The Purple Show (2003) as Jamie Madrox
- Go To Hell With Twiztid (2007), as Jamie Madrox
- 5 Min. Fury (2007), as Jamie Madrox
- Freestyle 101 (2009), as Jamie Madrox
- The Rave TV (2009), as Jamie Madrox
- Go Eat A Cheeseburger (2011), as demon
