= Monoxide Child =

American rapper (born 1973)

Monoxide
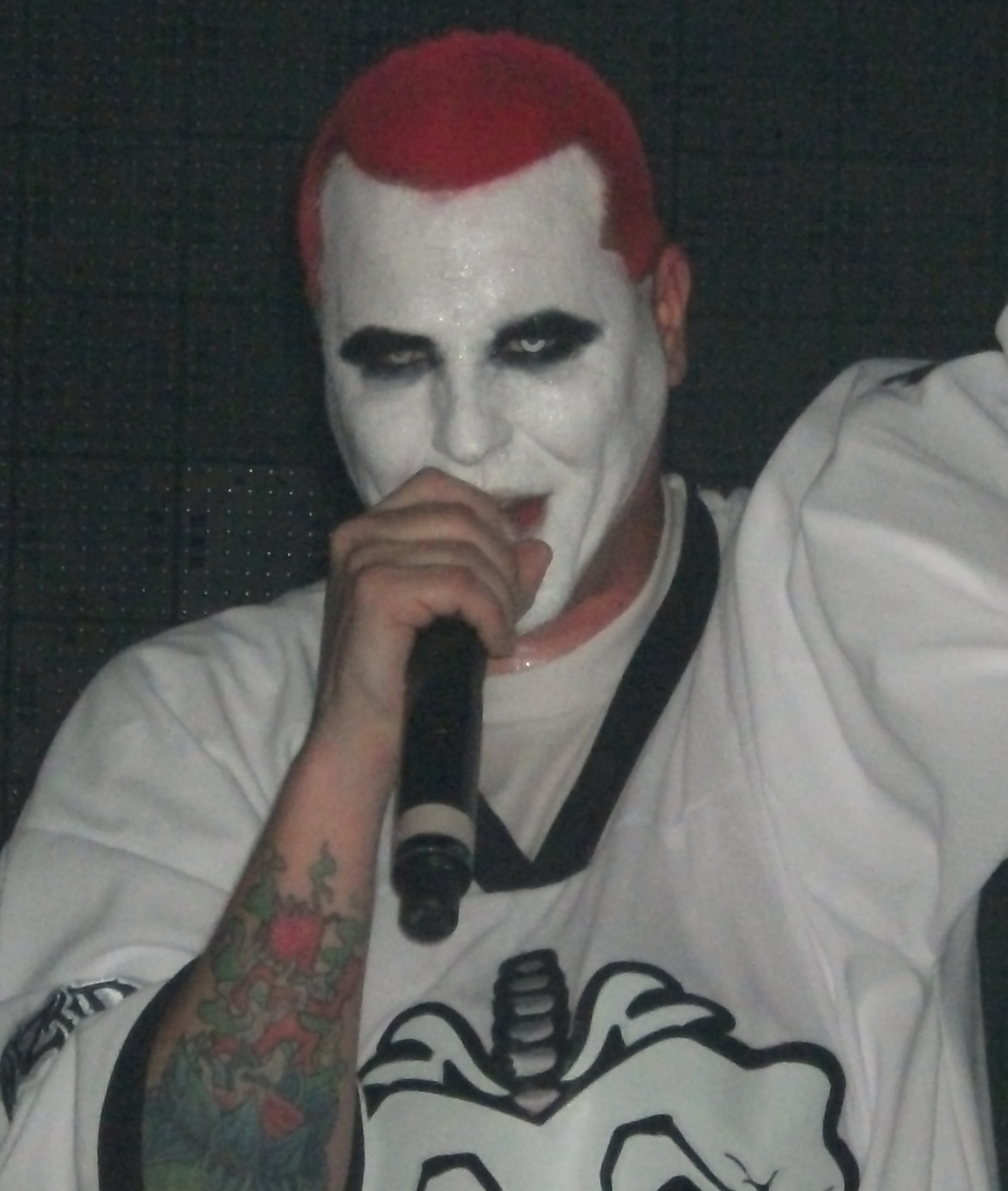
- Monoxide in 2013

Background information
- Also known as: X Hektic; The Monoxide Child; Foe Foe The Chainsmoker
- Born: Paul Robert Methric; July 14, 1973 (age 53)
- Origin: Detroit, Michigan, U.S.
- Genres: Hip hop, horrorcore, rap rock, rap metal
- Occupations: Rapper, producer, Actor
- Years active: 1992–present
- Labels: Majik Ninja Entertainment; Majik Recordz; Psychopathic; Latnem Entertainment
- Member of: House of Krazees; Twiztid
- Formerly of: Dark Lotus; Psychopathic Rydas
- Website: twiztid.com

Paul Robert Methric (born July 14, 1973) is an American rapper and producer from Detroit, Michigan, also known as Monoxide Child of the rap group Twiztid.

== Early life ==
Paul Methric began rapping as a teenager while he was in high school and listened to Bon Jovi for inspiration of lyrics he said. In school, Methric and friend Jamie Spaniolo would freestyle with other kids, though the two felt they were never great at promptly coming up with rhymes. Both recall going to school with late rapper Proof and seeing him freestyle, describing him as "the mecca of freestyling". Methric and Spaniolo also watched freestyle battles at the Hip Hop Shop on a weekly basis.

== Musical career ==
=== House of Krazees (1992–1997, 2013–present) ===
Methric started his musical career in 1992 as an original member of House of Krazees under the pseudonym Hektic. Along with Mr. Bones and The R.O.C., the original House of Krazees released five albums between 1993 and 1996. Problems with the group's label, Latnem Entertainment, led House of Krazees to leave the label, and the group disbanded after its 1996 album Head Trauma.

However, they reunited on the song "Monstrosity" off of Twiztid's A New Nightmare EP in 2013; they planned on releasing new music in 2018.

=== Solo career (2004–present) ===
In 2004, Methric released his first solo LP called Chainsmoker LP. His second solo album, Chainsmoker II, was released in 2024.

=== Twiztid (1997–present) ===
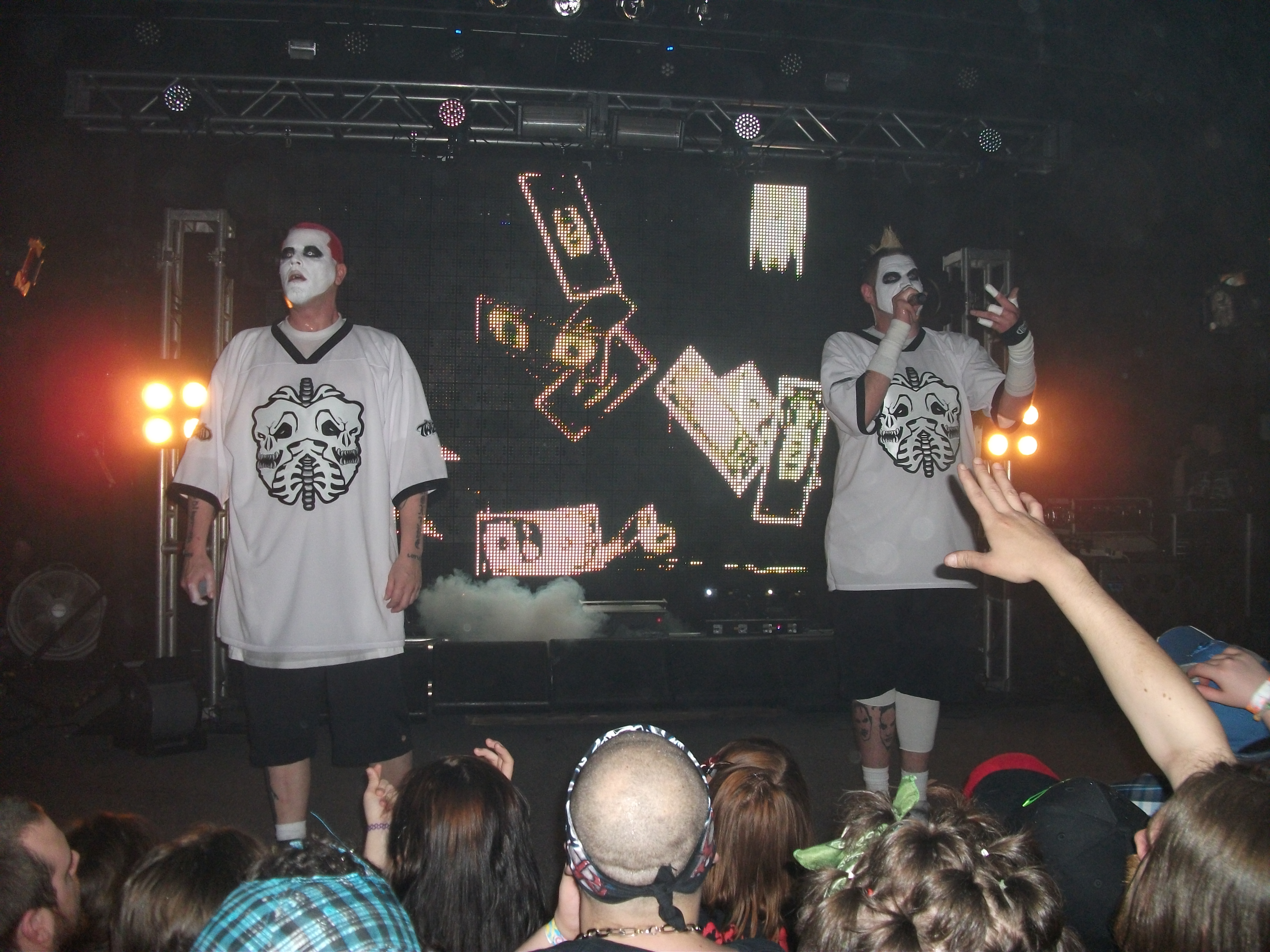
Twiztid performing in 2013

After receiving an offer from Insane Clown Posse to join Psychopathic Records in 1997, Spaniolo and Methric accepted and reemerged as Twiztid. Upon signing with the label, the duo revamped their image, and set out to prove themselves to the Juggalo fanbase. Twiztid opened shows for Insane Clown Posse, most of the time receiving boos from the crowds and occasionally getting into fights with them. In 1997, Twiztid's debut album, Mostasteless, was released. With the release, a shift in reaction toward Twiztid occurred, and Juggalos slowly began to receive the duo well. Twiztid, however, continued to open for Insane Clown Posse and appear with them at in-store tours, improving their rapport with the fanbase.

In 1999, Insane Clown Posse persuaded Island Records to sign Twiztid. During Twiztid's brief stint with the label, Mostasteless was pulled from shelves and re-released under Island Records. The following year, the duo went back to Psychopathic Records and released Freek Show. Freek Show debuted at #51 on Billboard charts, and Twiztid's fan base grew immensely. Twiztid has remained with Psychopathic Records until 2012 with the formation of Majik Ninja Entertainment. They have helped to sign artists Blaze Ya Dead Homie, Young Wicked and The R.O.C among others to the new label. The duo's 2009 album, W.I.C.K.E.D., peaked at #11 on the Billboard 200. With the position, Spaniolo says that "it shows relevance. It shows that [we're] not just a sideshow act. It shows that we're not just protoges, we're not just coattail riders. We are here."

On December 12, it was announced via Twiztid's official Twitter that Twiztid has left Psychopathic Records.

=== Dark Lotus (1999–2017) ===
Formed in 1999, Dark Lotus consists of Joseph Bruce and Joseph Utsler of Insane Clown Posse, Jamie Spaniolo and Paul Methric of Twiztid, and Chris Rouleau. Each member is said to "act as a 'petal' of the lotus," and it was announced that there would be six members. After switching between two different "sixth members," Marz and Anybody Killa, Dark Lotus decided to keep the group to only five.

=== Psychopathic Rydas (1999–2017) ===
Psychopathic Rydas formed in 1999, and consists of Psychopathic Records-associated rappers performing under alternate stage names in the style of mainstream gangsta rap. The group's lineup consisted of Bruce (Bullet), Utsler (Full Clip), Methric (Foe Foe), Spaniolo (Lil' Shank), Rouleau (Cell Block) and David Hutto (Yung Dirt). Although, Twiztid has left Psychopathic, they are still a part of the Rydas.

Psychopathic Rydas reuses the beats of popular rappers within the genre without paying to license the original songs or requesting permission from copyright owners to use the music, effectively making their albums bootlegs and resulting in the releases becoming difficult to find in some markets.

== Style and influences ==
Methric's interests in both horror movies and tobacco has had a major influence on his music. In an interview with psychopathictraders.com Methric credited the music of Tupac Shakur as a very heavy influence in his music with his favorite tupac album being Me Against The World. Spaniolo describes the work of Twiztid "as if there was a Halloween or Friday the 13th on wax and Jason and Michael Myers could actually rap." Methric's stage name is an allusion to the carbon monoxide that comes from cigarettes. The title of his solo album, Chainsmoker LP, is taken from the practice of chain smoking.

== Wrestling career ==
Paul Methric
Personal information
- Born: July 14, 1973 (age 53)

Professional wrestling career
- Ring name: Monoxide Child
- Billed from: Detroit, Michigan
- Trained by: Self-Trained; Tommy Starr
- Debut: 1999

In 1999, Insane Clown Posse began a stint in the World Wrestling Federation (WWF). The duo brought Spaniolo and Methric along with them to shows backstage, being fans of wrestling themselves. After Insane Clown Posse left the WWF, they started a wrestling tour called the "Hellfire Wrestling" tour. Again, both Spaniolo and Methric were brought along backstage.

On December 19, 1999, both Spaniolo and Methric participated in the first "Juggalo Championshit Wrestling" event. As Jamie Madrox and Monoxide Child, they were featured in a 20-man battle royal to crown the first JCW Heavyweight Champion, which was won by Evil Dead. Spaniolo and Methric continued to sporadically wrestle for JCW until 2003. Both are untrained and have had several wrestlers show them moves backstage at shows. When asked in a 2009 interview if they were planning on returning to wrestling, Spaniolo replied, "No, we're not wrestlers. Every time we step into the ring, something bad happens. Either somebody gets hurt, or we get hurt ... There are things in life that you're good at, and not good at. [We're] not good at [wrestling]." He added that they will stick to simply watching wrestling.

== Personal life ==
Paul has kids. Along with Spaniolo, Methric is a fan of horror movies. As children, the two often watched The Evil Dead. Methric also enjoys the use of supernatural styles in films. Methric has an interest in getting into acting as well; he currently has gigs booked as typecasted and background characters.

Methric is a fan of video games and tobacco. He plays Xbox 360 online with the gamertag "infamousballer," and has cited Madden NFL 10 as one of his favorite games. Twiztid's internet radio show for WFKO is called Ashtrays and Action Figures, alluding to Methric's love of cigarettes and Spaniolo's passion for collector items and memorabilia.

Methric is a fan of professional wrestling. He is a playable character in Eidos Interactive's video game Backyard Wrestling: Don't Try This at Home as Monoxide Child.

== Discography ==
- Chainsmoker LP (November 16, 2004)
- Chainsmoker II (February 29, 2024)

== Group membership ==
- House of Krazees as Hektic (1992–1997, 2013–present)
- International Superstars Incorporated (1997)
- Twiztid (1997–present)
- Dark Lotus (1998–2017)
- Psychopathic Rydas (1999–2017)
- Samhein Witch Killaz (2005–2009)
- Triple Threat (2005–present)
- Venomous 5 (2018–present)

== Filmography ==
=== Film appearances ===
- Big Money Hustlas (2000), as Lil' Poot
- Born Twiztid: Behind The Freekshow (2000), as Monoxide Child
- The Purple Show (2003), as Monoxide Child
- A Family Underground (2009), as Monoxide
- Big Money Rustlas (2010), as Dusty Poot

=== Television and internet programs ===
- Go To Hell With Twiztid (2007), as Monoxide
- 5 Min. Fury (2007), as Monoxide
- Freestyle 101 (2009), as Monoxide
- The Rave TV (2009), as Monoxide
