= Twiztid discography =

American hip hop duo

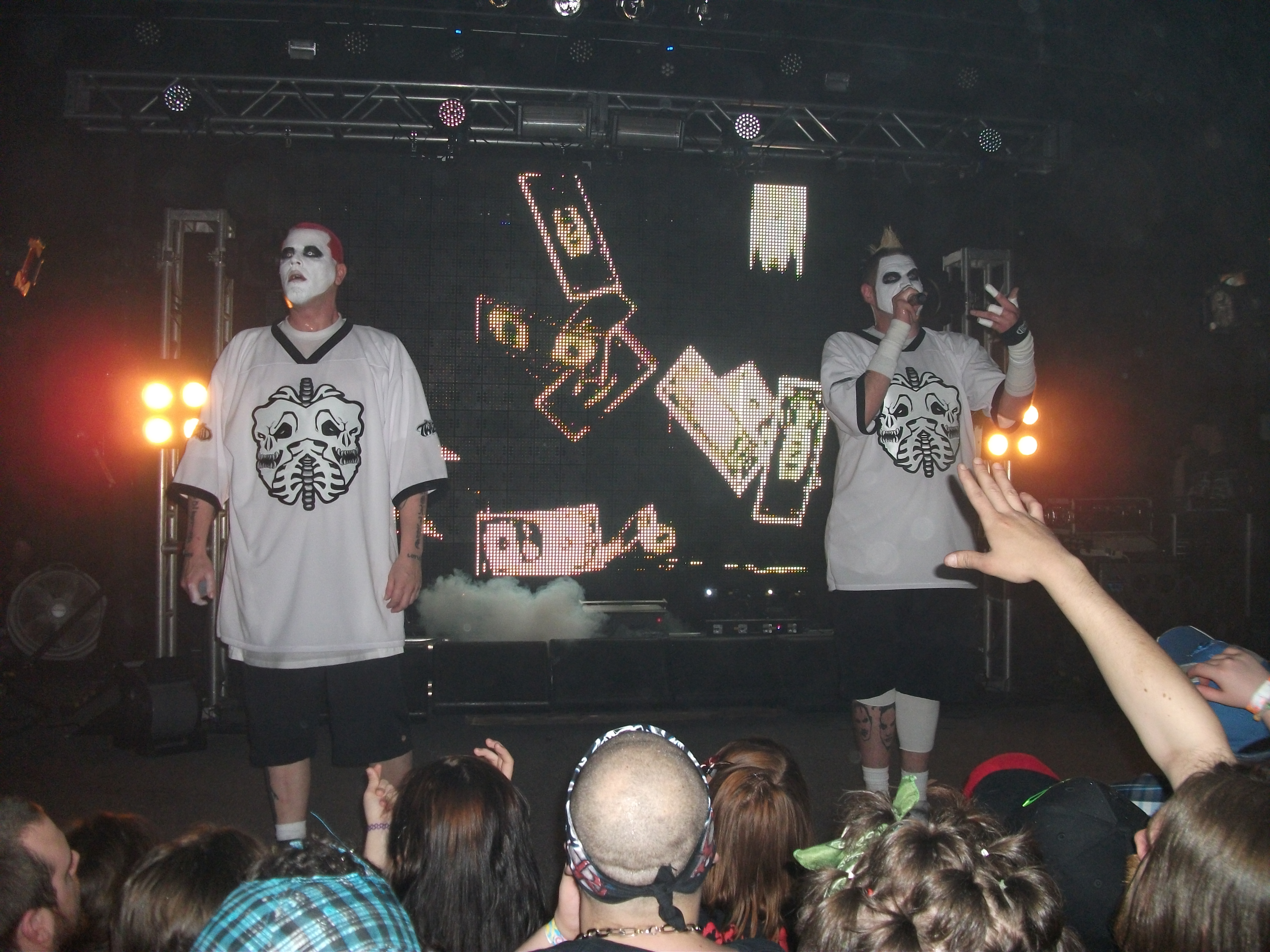
- Twiztid performing live.
- Studio albums: 17
- Extended plays: 21
- Compilation albums: 20

American hip hop duo Twiztid, formed by and consisting of Michigan rappers Jamie "Madrox" Spaniolo and Paul "Monoxide" Methric, have released 17 full-length studio albums, 21 extended plays, 20 compilation albums and two mixtapes. Since their 1997 debut on Insane Clown Posse's Psychopathic Records label, the group have garnered a major cult following, providing guest appearances on numerous Psychopathic releases over their decade in the music industry, as well as joining fellow Psychopathic artists on the label's compilations and forming the supergroups Psychopathic Rydas and Dark Lotus.

Twiztid left Psychopathic Records on December 12, 2012, and was announced by both ICP and Twiztid via Twitter and was reported via Faygoluvers. On September 12, 2014, INgrooves announced that Twiztid had formed the Majik Ninja Entertainment label.

== Albums ==
=== Studio albums ===
List of studio albums, with selected chart positions
Title	Album details	Peak chart positions									
Title	Album details	US	US Alt.	US HH	US Rap	US Sales	US Vinyl	US Indie	US Cat.	US Heat.	US Taste
Mostasteless	Released: August 4, 1998; Label: Psychopathic	149	—	—	—	149	—	—	—	8	—
Freek Show	Released: October 31, 2000; Label: Island Def Jam Music Group	51	—	—	—	51	—	—	—	—	—
The Green Book	Released: July 1, 2003; Label: Method Recordings, Psychopathic	52	—	—	—	29	1	2	2	—	—
Man's Myth (Vol. 1)	Released: June 28, 2005; Label: Method Recordings, Psychopathic	62	—	—	14	62	—	4	—	—	—
Mutant (Vol. 2)	Released: July 26, 2005; Label: Method Recordings, Psychopathic	80	—	—	20	80	—	11	—	—	—
Independents Day	Released: July 3, 2007; Label: Shock, Psychopathic	57	—	—	9	57	—	4	—	—	8
W.I.C.K.E.D.	Released: March 17, 2009; Label: Psychopathic	11	—	—	4	11	—	1	—	—	8
Heartbroken & Homicidal	Released: September 21, 2010; Label: Psychopathic	29	—	—	3	29	—	3	—	—	22
Abominationz	Released: October 22, 2012; Label: Psychopathic	18	—	—	2	18	—	4	—	—	6
The Darkness	Released: January 27, 2015; Label: Majik Ninja	29	—	—	3	18	24	5	—	—	22
The Continuous Evilution of Life's ?'s	Released: January 27, 2017; Label: Majik Ninja	28	—	13	8	11	16	3	—	—	15
Generation Nightmare	Released: April 26, 2019; Label: Majik Ninja	51	5	27	22	9	—	3	—	—	—
Mad Season	Released: April 20, 2020; Label: Majik Ninja	—	—	—	—	9	—	38	—	—	—
Revelashen	Released: November 27, 2020; Label: Majik Ninja	—	—	—	—	—	—	—	—	—	—
Unlikely Prescription	Released: September 10, 2021; Label: Majik Ninja	—	—	—	—	16	—	—	—	—	—
Glyph	Released: November 28, 2022; Label: Majik Ninja	—	—	—	—	—	—	—	—	—	—
Welcome to Your Funeral	Release: February 14, 2025; Label: Majik Ninja	—	—	—	—	—	—	—	—	—	—
"—" denotes releases that did not chart, or was not released in that country.

=== Compilation and remix albums ===
List of compilation albums, with selected chart positions
Title	Album details	Peak chart positions				
Title	Album details	US	US HH	US Rap	US Sales	US Indie
Psychopathics from Outer Space (with Insane Clown Posse)	Released: September 30, 1999; Label: Joe & Joey	—	—	—	—	—
Cryptic Collection	Released: November 13, 2000; Label: Psychopathic	—	—	—	—	—
Cryptic Collection 2	Released: October 22, 2001; Label: Psychopathic	—	—	—	—	—
Cryptic Collection 3	Released: May 18, 2004; Label: Psychopathic	85	—	—	85	2
Cryptic Collection: Halloween Edition	Released: October 2006; Label: Psychopathic	—	—	—	—	—
Cryptic Collection: Holiday Edition	Released: December 2009; Label: Psychopathic	—	—	—	—	—
Cryptic Collection 4	Released: September 13, 2011; Label: Psychopathic	108	—	13	108	17
A Cut-Throat Christmas	Released: December 2011; Label: Psychopathic	—	—	—	—	—
Kronik Collection	Released: May 2012; Label: Psychopathic	—	—	—	—	—
Mutant: Remixed & Remastered	Released: March 4, 2016; Label: Majik Ninja	114	—	10	46	6
Cryptic Collection: Valentine's Day Edition	Released: February 14, 2017; Label: Majik Ninja	—	—	—	—	—
Twiztid Presents: Year of the Sword	Released: December 1, 2017; Label: Majik Ninja	81	34	25	31	3
Cryptic Collection: Bongs & Blunts	Released: April 20, 2018; Label: Majik Ninja	—	—	—	—	—
15 Years of Fright Fest	Released: October 10, 2018; Label: Majik Ninja	—	—	—	—	—
Cryptic Collection: VIP Edition	Released: November 23, 2018; Label: Majik Ninja	—	—	—	—	—
Dont Play This 4 Any1!	Released: 2019; Label: Majik Ninja	—	—	—	—	—
Time Tunnel Vol. 1	Released: October 2019; Label: Majik Ninja	—	—	—	—	—
4 Tha Fam Vol. 3	Released: November 27, 2020; Label: Majik Ninja	—	—	—	—	—
Fright Fest 2022: Attack Of The Ninjas Collection	Released: October 30, 2022; Label: Majik Ninja	—	—	—	—	—
Songs Of Samhain (Vinyl Box Set)	Released: 2023; Label: Majik Ninja	—	—	—	—	—
Christmas Collection	Released: December 15, 2023; Label: Majik Ninja	—	—	—	—	—
Cryptic Collection: Fright Fest Edition	Released: October 29, 2024; Label: Majik Ninja	—	—	—	—	—
Freek Show (Twiztid's Version)	Released: October 31, 2025; Label: Majik Ninja	—	—	—	—	—
"—" denotes releases that did not chart, or was not released in that country.

=== Extended plays ===
List of extended plays, with selected chart positions
Title	Album details	Peak chart positions		
Title	Album details	US	US Sales	US Indie
Mirror Mirror	Released: April 9, 2002; Label: Psychopathic	103	103	5
4 tha Fam EP	Released: May 19, 2003; Label: Psychopathic	—	—	—
Fright Fest 2003	Released: October 31, 2003; Label: Psychopathic	—	—	—
Fright Fest 2005	Released: October 31, 2005; Label: Psychopathic	—	—	—
Toxic Terror	Released: 2008; Label: Psychopathic	—	—	—
End of Days	Released: May 5, 2009; Label: Psychopathic	—	—	—
American Psycho (with Insane Clown Posse)	Released: 2011; Label: Psychopathic	—	—	—
Get Twiztid	Released: April 15, 2014; Label: Twiztid, LLC	—	—	—
Trapped (GOTJ 2016 Edition)	Released: July 21, 2016; Label: Majik Ninja	—	—	—
Be My Bloody Valentine	Released February 17, 2017; Label: Majik Ninja	—	—	—
Come On Let's Get High	Released: April 20, 2017; Label: Majik Ninja	—	—	—
Psychomania EP	Released: May 11, 2017; Label: Majik Ninja	—	—	—
Trick or Treat EP	Released: October 26, 2018; Label: Majik Ninja	—	—	—
Back 2 the 80s	Released: February 8, 2020; Label: Majik Ninja	—	—	—
Electric Lettuce	Released: April 20, 2021; Label: Majik Ninja	—	—	—
Mystery	Released: November 25, 2022; Label: Majik Ninja	—	—	—
Nickel Bag	Released: April 22, 2022; Label: Majik Ninja	—	—	—
Echoes From Dimension X	Released: April 1, 2023; Label: Majik Ninja	—	—	—
Odyssey (w/Blaze Ya Dead Homie & DJ Godzilla)	Released: September 29, 2023; Label: Majik Ninja	—	—	—
Hallowbleed 4 VIP (w/Bukshot)	Released: October 2023; Label: Majik Ninja, Mobstyle	—	—	—
Electric Lettuce: Deluxe Edition EP	Released: April 20, 2024; Label: Majik Ninja	—	—	—
"—" denotes releases that did not chart, or was not released in that country.				

=== Mixtapes ===
List of mixtapes, with selected chart positions
Title	Album details	Peak chart positions			
Title	Album details	US	US Rap	US Sales	US Indie
A New Nightmare	Released: July 30, 2013; Label: Twiztid, LLC	115	17	115	23
4 tha Fam, Vol. 2	Released: March 27, 2014; Label: Twiztid, LLC	—	—	—	—
"—" denotes releases that did not chart, or was not released in that country.

== Singles ==
List of singles as lead artist, showing year released and album name
Year	Title	Peak chart positions	Album	Label
Year	Title	US Main.	Album	Label
1999	Rock the Dead	—	Mostasteless	Psychopathic Records
2000	We Don't Die	—	Freek Show	Psychopathic Records
2003	Afraid of Me	—	The Green Book	Psychopathic Records
2003	Darkness	—	The Green Book	Psychopathic Records
2005	Story of Our Lives	—	Man's Myth (Vol. 1)	Psychopathic Records
2007	Raw Deal (Juggalo Song)	—	Independents Day	Psychopathic Records
2009	Buckets of Blood	—	W.I.C.K.E.D.	Psychopathic Records
2009	Ha Ha Ha Ha Ha Ha Ha Ha	—	W.I.C.K.E.D.	Psychopathic Records
2011	Triple Threat	—	Mutant (Vol. 2)	Psychopathic Records
2013	Down With Us (ft. Wrekonize)	—	A New Nightmare	Twiztid, LLC
2013	The Deep End (ft. Caskey & Dominic)	—	A New Nightmare	Twiztid, LLC
2013	Screaming Out (ft. Dominic & Irv Da Phenom)	—	A New Nightmare	Twiztid, LLC
2014	Sick Man (ft. Blaze Ya Dead Homie)	—	A New Nightmare	Twiztid, LLC
2014	Breakdown	—	Get Twiztid EP	Twiztid, LLC
2015	A Little Fucked Up	—	The Darkness	Majik Ninja Entertainment
2015	Boogieman	—	The Darkness	Majik Ninja Entertainment
2015	No Breaks	—	The Darkness	Majik Ninja Entertainment
2015	A Place in The Woods (ft. Blaze Ya Dead Homie)	—	The Darkness	Majik Ninja Entertainment
2015	F.T.S.	—	The Darkness	Majik Ninja Entertainment
2016	Psychomania	—	The Continuous Evilution of Life's ?'s	Majik Ninja Entertainment
2016	Are You Insane Like Me?	—	The Continuous Evilution of Life's ?'s	Majik Ninja Entertainment
2016	Nothing to U	—	The Continuous Evilution of Life's ?'s	Majik Ninja Entertainment
2016	Kill Somebody	—	The Continuous Evilution of Life's ?'s	Majik Ninja Entertainment
2017	Dead & Gone (Unh-Stop)	—	The Continuous Evilution of Life's ?'s	Majik Ninja Entertainment
2017	Come on Let's Get High	—	The Continuous Evilution of Life's ?'s	Majik Ninja Entertainment
2018	SplitInThisPaint	—	Generation Nightmare	Majik Ninja Entertainment
2018	Sick Mind	—	Generation Nightmare	Majik Ninja Entertainment
2019	Livin' at the Bottom	—	Generation Nightmare	Majik Ninja Entertainment
2019	F Feelings	—	Mad Season	Majik Ninja Entertainment
2020	Never Change	—	Mad Season	Majik Ninja Entertainment
2020	Laughable (ft. Young Wicked)	—	Revelashen	Majik Ninja Entertainment
2020	Rose Petal	32	Unlikely Prescription	Majik Ninja Entertainment
2021	Corkscrew	—	Unlikely Prescription	Majik Ninja Entertainment
2021	Envy (ft. Ice Nine Kills)	32	Unlikely Prescription	Majik Ninja Entertainment

=== Non-album singles ===
List of singles as lead artist, showing year released and album name
Year	Title	Peak chart positions	Album	Label
Year	Title	US Main.	Album	Label
2001	Wrong With Me	—	Black Magick single	Psychopathic Records
2012	Annihilating Life	—	New Year's Evil single	Twiztid, LLC.
2013	Impending Evil	—	Fright Fest single	Twiztid, LLC.
2013	Embarrassed	—	Red Vinyl Series Vol. 1	Twiztid, LLC.
2014	Bad Trip	—	Tour Exclusive single	Majik Ninja Entertainment
2015	Tonight (ft. Ajax/The R.O.C./Blaze Ya Dead Homie/Swag Toof/Insane E/Prozak)	—	3rd Annual 420 Show	Majik Ninja Entertainment
2015	Feed the Beast	—	Tour Exclusive single	Majik Ninja Entertainment
2015	Welcome to the Underground (ft. Blaze Ya Dead Homie and Boondox)	—	Tour Exclusive single	Majik Ninja Entertainment
2018	Here With the Dead	—	Halloween single	Majik Ninja Entertainment
2018	Death Day	—	Halloween single	Majik Ninja Entertainment
2018	Name Brand > Off Brand	—	Halloween single	Majik Ninja Entertainment
2020	All These Problems	—	Record Store Day single	Majik Ninja Entertainment

== Music videos ==
Year	Title	Album	Main Performer	Label	Performed As	Member(s)
1998	Hokus Pokus (Headhuntaz Remix)	Forgotten Freshness Volumes 1 & 2	Insane Clown Posse	Psychopathic Records	Cameo	Twiztid
1999	Another Love Song	The Amazing Jeckel Brothers	Insane Clown Posse	Psychopathic Records	Cameo	Twiztid
1999	Rock The Dead	Mostateless (Reissue Version)	Twiztid	Psychopathic Records	Main Performers	Twiztid
2000	We Don't Die	Freek Show	Twiztid	Psychopathic Records	Main Performers	Twiztid
2002	Juggalo Homies	The Wraith: Shangri-La	Insane Clown Posse	Psychopathic Records	Featured Artists	Twiztid
2003	Afraid Of Me	The Green Book	Twiztid	Psychopathic Records	Main Performers	Twiztid
2005	Story Of Our Lives	Man's Myth (Vol. 1)	Twiztid	Psychopathic Records	Main Performers	Twiztid
2009	Raw Deal (Juggalo Song)	Independents Day	Twiztid	Psychopathic Records	Main Performers	Twiztid
2009	Buckets Of Blood	W.I.C.K.E.D.	Twiztid	Psychopathic Records	Main Performers	Twiztid
2009	Ha Ha Ha Ha Ha Ha Ha Ha	W.I.C.K.E.D.	Twiztid	Psychopathic Records	Main Performers	Twiztid
2009	In Yo Face	Bang! Pow! Boom!	Insane Clown Posse	Psychopathic Records	Cameo	Twiztid
2011	Triple Threat (ft. Blaze Ya Dead Homie)	Mutant (Vol. 2)	Twiztid	Psychopathic Records	Main Performers	Twiztid
2012	Watch Out	Mile High	Kottonmouth Kings	Suburban Noize Records	Featured Artists	Twiztid
2013	Down With Us (ft. Wreckonize)	A New Nightmare	Twiztid	Independent	Main Performers	Twiztid
2013	The Deep End (ft. Caskey & Dominic)	A New Nightmare	Twiztid	Independent	Main Performers	Twiztid
2013	Sick Man (ft. Blaze Ya Dead Homie)	A New Nightmare	Twiztid	Independent	Main Performers	Twiztid
2014	Breakdown	Get Twiztid EP	Twiztid	Independent	Main Performers	Twiztid
2015	A Little Fucked Up	The Darkness	Twiztid	Majik Ninja Entertainment	Main Performers	Twiztid
2015	Boogieman	The Darkness	Twiztid	Majik Ninja Entertainment	Main Performers	Twiztid
2015	No Breaks	The Darkness	Twiztid	Majik Ninja Entertainment	Main Performers	Twiztid
2015	F.T.S.	The Darkness	Twiztid	Majik Ninja Entertainment	Main Performers	Twiztid
2016	Familiar (Live Music Video)	Mutant Vol. 2 (remixed and remastered)	Twiztid	Majik Ninja Entertainment	Main Performers	Twiztid
2016	Who U Lookin' 4? (ft. Boondox)	The Casket Factory	Blaze Ya Dead Homie	Majik Ninja Entertainment	Cameo (hook/refrain only)	Twiztid
2016	Raw Shit	The Black Season EP	Lex "The Hex" Master	Majik Ninja Entertainment	Featured artist	Monoxide Child
2016	Hom Sha Bom	The Green Book	Twiztid	Majik Ninja Entertainment	Main Performers	Twiztid
2017	Kill Somebody	The Continuous Evilution of Life's ?'s	Twiztid	Majik Ninja Entertainment	Main Performers	Twiztid
2017	Too Many Freaks	Born In Fire	Davey Suicide		Featured Artists	Twiztid
2017	Outlined In Chalk (ft. Twiztid, Blaze Ya Dead Homie, The R.O.C., Lex "The Hex" Master, G-Mo Skee, Gorilla Voltage & Young Wicked)	The Murder	Boondox	Majik Ninja Entertainment	Featured Artists	Twiztid
2017	My Filthy Spirit Bomb	My Filthy Spirit Bomb	G-Mo Skee	Majik Ninja Entertainment	Cameo	Twiztid
2017	Dead & Gone (Unh-Stop)	The Continuous Evilution Of Life's ?'s	Twiztid	Majik Ninja Entertainment	Main Performers	Twiztid
2017	2nd Hand Smoke	Mostasteless	Twiztid	Majik Ninja Entertainment	Main Performers	Twiztid
2017	Nothing To You	The Continuous Evilution Of Life's ?'s	Twiztid	Majik Ninja Entertainment	Main Performers	Twiztid
2018	2 Middle Fingerz	The Casket Factory	Blaze Ya Dead Homie	Majik Ninja Entertainment	Cameo	Twiztid
2018	Heads Will Roll (Gorilla Voltage & Jamie Madrox)	Twiztid Presents: Year Of The Sword	Various	Majik Ninja Entertainment	Main Performer	Jamie Madrox
2018	Still I Rise (ft. Jamie Madrox & Rittz)	The Return Of The Prodigal Son	Young Wicked	Majik Ninja Entertainment	Featured Performer	Jamie Madrox
2018	Black Clouds	The Continuous Evilution Of Life's ?'s	Twiztid	Majik Ninja Entertainment	Main Performers	Twiztid
2020	All Of The Above	W.I.C.K.E.D.	Twiztid	Majik Ninja Entertainment	Main Performers	Twiztid
2021	Envy (ft. Ice Nine Kills)	Unlikely Prescription	Twiztid	Majik Ninja Entertainment	Main Performers	Twiztid

== Guest appearances ==
Year	Artist(s)	Album	Song	Member(s) of Twiztid
1999	Insane Clown Posse	The Amazing Jeckel Brothers	Echo Side	Twiztid
2000	Blaze Ya Dead Homie	Blaze Ya Dead Homie EP	Shittalkaz	Twiztid
2000	Insane Clown Posse	Bizzar	Crystal Ball	Twiztid
2000	Insane Clown Posse	Bizaar	Whut	Twiztid
2000	Three 6 Mafia	When the Smoke Clears: Sixty 6, Sixty 1	Just Another Crazy Click	Twiztid
2001	Blaze Ya Dead Homie	1 Less G n da Hood	Grave Ain't No Place (w/Anybody Killa)	Monoxide Child
2001	Blaze Ya Dead Homie	1 Less G n da Hood	Juggalo Anthem	Jamie Madrox
2001	Blaze Ya Dead Homie	1 Less G n da Hood	Here I Am	Twiztid
2001	Blaze Ya Dead Homie	1 Less G n da Hood	Saturday Afternoon	Jamie Madrox
2001	Blaze Ya Dead Homie	1 Less G n da Hood	Given Half A Chance (w/Insane Clown Posse)	Twiztid
2001	Blaze Ya Dead Homie	1 Less G n da Hood	Thug 4 Life (w/Anybody Killa)	Jamie Madrox
2001	Blaze Ya Dead Homie	1 Less G n da Hood	Hatchet Execution (w/Insane Clown Posse)	Twiztid
2002	Insane Clown Posse	The Wraith: Shangri-La	Juggalo Homies	Twiztid
2002	Jumpsteady	The Chaos Theory	Ninjas In Action	Twiztid
2003	Anybody Killa	Hatchet Warrior	Ghetto Neighbor	Monoxide Child
2003	Anybody Killa	Hatchet Warrior	Come Out To Play	Jamie Madrox
2003	Violent J	Wizard of the Hood EP	Homie 2 Smoke With	Monoxide Child
2003	Violent J	Wizard of the Hood EP	Thug Whilin	Twiztid
2003	Violent J	Wizard of the Hood EP	What U Thinkin' Bout?	Twiztid
2003	Violent J	Wizard of the Hood EP	The Wizard's Palace	Twiztid
2003	Esham	Repentance	Look At Me	Twiztid
2004	Anybody Killa	Dirty History	Retaliate	Twiztid
2004	Monoxide	Chainsmoker	Evil (w/Anybody Killa)	Jamie Madrox
2004	Blaze Ya Dead Homie	Colton Grundy: The Undying	Shotgun (w/Anybody Killa & Esham)	Jamie Madrox on hook
2004	Blaze Ya Dead Homie	Colton Grundy: The Undying	If I Fall	Jamie Madrox
2004	Blaze Ya Dead Homie	Colton Grundy: The Undying	Climbing (w/Insane Clown Posse & Esham)	Twiztid
2005	Insane Clown Posse	Forgotten Freshness Volume 4	Homies (MEC mix)	Twiztid
2006	Shaggy 2 Dope	F.T.F.O.	Always Fuckin' With Us	Twiztid
2006	Axe Murder Boyz	Blood In, Blood Out	All Day	Twiztid
2006	Boondox	The Harvest	Red Mist (w/Blaze Ya Dead Homie)	Twiztid
2006	Subnoize Souljaz	Droppin Bombs	Droppin Bombs	Twiztid
2006	Potluck	Straight Outta Humboldt	Funeral	Twiztid
2006	Dead Creep Orchestra	Dead Creep Orchestra	Fuck You	Twiztid
2006	Jamie Madrox	Phatso	This Bitch	Monoxide
2006	Jamie Madrox	Phatso	4Fist2AxeHandles	Monoxide
2006	Jamie Madrox	Phatso: The Earth 2	This Bitch (Mic Mix) (ft. Violent J)	Monoxide
2007	Blaze Ya Dead Homie	Clockwork Gray	Toe Tagz N Body Bagz	Jamie Madrox
2007	Blaze Ya Dead Homie	Clockwork Gray	Some Of Them Thugs	Monoxide Child
2007	Blaze Ya Dead Homie	Clockwork Gray	Inside Looking Out (w/The R.O.C.)	Twiztid
2007	Bizarre	Blue Cheese & Coney Island	Wicked	Twiztid
2008	DJ Clay	Let 'Em Bleed: The Mixxtape, Vol. 1	Sickness (w/Blaze Ya Dead Homie	Twiztid
2008	Krizz Kaliko	Vitiligo	Peek-A-Boo (w/Prozak)	Twiztid
2008	Prozak	Tales From The Sick	Fading... (w/Krizz Kaliko)	Twiztid
2008	Durty White Boyz	Unoriginal & Lyrically Offensive: The Mixtape	Intro (Monoxide Speaks)	Monoxide
2008	Durty White Boyz	Unoriginal & Lyrically Offensive: The Mixtape	Thug Pretty	Twiztid
2008	Durty White Boyz	Unoriginal & Lyrically Offensive: The Mixtape	Outro (Monoxide & Delusional Speak)	Jamie Madrox
2008	DJ Clay	Let 'Em Bleed: The Mixxtape, Vol. 2	Karma (Remix)	Twiztid
2008	DJ Clay	Let 'Em Bleed: The Mixxtape, Vol. 2	Birds And Bees	Twiztid
2008	DJ Clay	Let 'Em Bleed: The Mixxtape, Vol. 3	You're The Reason (Remix)	Twiztid
2008	DJ Clay	Let 'Em Bleed: The Mixxtape, Vol. 3	Kept Grindin' (w/Insane Clown Posse, Blaze Ya Dead Homie & Boondox)	Twiztid
2009	Potluck	Pipe Dreams	Smoke The Pain Away	Twiztid
2009	DJ Clay	Let 'Em Bleed: The Mixxtape, Vol. 4	I Shot A Hater (w/Three 6 Mafia)	Twiztid
2010	DJ Clay	Book of the Wicked, Chapter One	Star Dust (Remix)	Twiztid
2010	DJ Clay	Book of the Wicked, Chapter Two	The Message	Twiztid
2010	DJ Clay	Book of the Wicked, Chapter Two	Krossroads Inn (Remix)	Twiztid
2011	The Dayton Family	Charges of Indictment	Kill	Twiztid
2011	King Gordy	Jesus Christ's Mistress	Sing For The Dead Part 2	Twiztid
2011	Insane Clown Posse	American Psycho EP	Get Geeked	Twiztid
2012	T.O.N.E-Z	Underground Collabos	Thug Money (w/ Delusional)	Twiztid
2012	Prozak	Paranormal	Line In The Middle	Twiztid
2012	Krizz Kaliko	Kickin' and Screamin'	Dixie Cup	Twiztid
2012	Krizz Kaliko	Kickin' and Screamin'	Wannabe	Twiztid
2012	Insane Clown Posse	Smothered, Covered & Chunked	Prelude (Efil4zaggin)	Twiztid
2012	Insane Clown Posse	Mike E. Clark's Extra Pop Emporium	Scrubstitute Teachers	Twiztid
2012	Kottonmouth Kings	Mile High	Watch Out	Twiztid
2012	Prozak	Nocturnal EP	Vigilante	Twiztid
2013	Durty White Boyz	Firecrackaz	Thug Pretty	Twiztid
2013	Lil Wyte & JellyRoll	No Filter	One Of Them Dayz	Twiztid
2013	Liquid Assassin & Rittz	Mongrel	Creature	Twiztid
2013	Insane Clown Posse	Forgotten Freshness Volume 5	Get Geeked	Twiztid
2014	Blaze Ya Dead Homie	Gang Rags: Reborn	Bout Dat Life	Twiztid
2014	Blaze Ya Dead Homie	Gang Rags: Reborn	Who Is It?	Twiztid
2014	Blaze Ya Dead Homie	Gang Rags: Reborn	Dead Like Me (w/The R.O.C.)	Twiztid
2015	Bukshot	Nightmare Hall	Freak Show	Twiztid
2015	Kottonmouth Kings	Krown Power	1 More Body (w/Jared Gomes)	
2015	Prozak	Black Ink	Do You Know Were You Are?	
2016	Blaze Ya Dead Homie	The Casket Factory	Who U Lookin' 4? (w/Boondox)	Jamie Madrox on hook
2016	Blaze Ya Dead Homie	The Casket Factory	Unbreakable	Jamie Madrox on hook
2016	Blaze Ya Dead Homie	The Casket Factory	Necromancy	Twiztid
2016	Lex "The Hex" Master	The Black Season EP	Raw Shit	Monoxide Child
2016	Kung Fu Vampire	Look Alive	Duality	Twiztid
2016	Lex "The Hex" Master	Contact	Domination (w/Blaze Ya Dead Homie & Boondox)	Twiztid
2016	Lex "The Hex" Master	Contact	I Don't Like Your Face	Jamie Madrox
2016	Lex "The Hex" Master	Contact	Disgusting	Twiztid
2016	G-Mo Skee	My Filthy Spirit Bomb	Unfeigned (w/Hopsin & Katz)	Twiztid
2016	Young Wicked	Vengeance EP	Bloodbath	Twiztid
2017	Gorilla Voltage	Ape–X	Ninja Star	Twiztid
2017	Boondox	The Murder	Purge	Twiztid
2017	Boondox	The Murder	Born In Fire (w/Bubba Sparxxx & Struggle	Jamie Madrox
2017	Boondox	The Murder	Sitting On The Porch	Jamie Madrox
2017	Boondox	The Murder	Outlined In Chalk (w/Blaze Ya Dead Homie, Lex "The Hex" Master, G-Mo Skee & Young Wicked)	Twiztid
2017	Boondox	The Murder	Terminus	Jamie Madrox
2017	Davey Suicide	Made In Fire	Too Many Freaks	Twiztid
2017	The R.O.C.	Digital Voodoo	Disgusted	Twiztid
2017	Mars	Creatures of the Night (Single)	Creatures of the Night(w/Tech N9ne)	Twiztid
2017	Mars	Creatures of the Night (Single)	Creatures Remix(w/Tech N9ne)	Twiztid
2017	Young Wicked	The Return Of The Prodigal Son	Blaow (w/G-Mo Skee)	Monoxide Child
2017	Young Wicked	The Return Of The Prodigal Son	Still I Rise (w/Rittz)	Jamie Madrox
2017	Bukshot	Weirdo: Full Moon	Freak Show (Remix) (w/Madchild)	Twiztid
2017	Lex "The Hex" Master	Beyond Redemption	Shadow Army (w/Gorilla Voltage & Reznik)	Twiztid
2017	Various	Twiztid Presents: Year of the Sword	Heads Will Roll (w/Gorilla Voltage)	Jamie Madrox
2017	Various	Twiztid Presents: Year of the Sword	Turn It Up (w/Blaze Ya Dead Homie, Lex "The Hex" Master & Bonez Dubb)	Jamie Madrox
2017	Various	Twiztid Presents: Year of the Sword	Their Fault (w/Young Wicked)	Jamie Madrox
2017	Various	Twiztid Presents: Year of the Sword	Ignite (w/The R.O.C., Mr. Grey, Blaze Ya Dead Homie & King Gordy	Monoxide Child
2017	Various	Twiztid Presents: Year of the Sword	Galaxy (w/G-Mo Skee & King Gordy)	Jamie Madrox
2017	Various	Twiztid Presents: Year of the Sword	B.N.U. (w/Young Wicked, G-Mo Skee, Blaze Ya Dead Homie, Gorilla Voltage, Bonez Dubb & Last American Rock Stars)	Jamie Madrox
2018	Last American Rock Stars	Last American Rock Stars	Rock & Roll	Twiztid
2018	Kottonmouth Kings	Kingdom Come	Krown Town	Twiztid
2018	Axe Murder Boyz	Muerte	Low Down	Twiztid
2018	The Underground Avengers	Anomaly 88	Thanos (w/Tech N9ne, Rittz, Jelly Roll, Crucifix, King ISO & Krizz Kaliko)	Twiztid
2018	Alla Xul Elu	The Almighty	Venomous	Twiztid
2019	Various	Songs To Smoke To	Wasted 3 (w/ Rittz, Young Wicked, King Gordy, The R.O.C., Blaze Ya Dead Homie, G-Mo Skee & Redd)	Twiztid
2019	Various	Songs To Smoke To	Clockin' W's (w/ Rittz & Young Wicked)	Twiztid
2019	Various	Songs To Smoke To	Don't Be Hatin' (w/ Young Wicked)	Twiztid
2019	Various	Songs To Smoke To	Something New	Twiztid
2019	Lex "The Hex" Master	Strictly For My Ninjas	Raw Shift [FTC Remix]	Jamie Madrox
2020	Lex "The Hex" Master	Haunted Mansion [Episode 2]	Insane (w/ Blaze Ya Dead Homie, & Boondox)	Jamie Madrox
2020	Oh! The Horror	Halloween 365	Scream!	Jamie Madrox
2020	Alla Xul Elu	Mauxuleum	Donna, The Dead	Monoxide Child
2020	Various	Songs of Samhain	Wash	House Of Krazees
2020	Various	Songs of Samhain	9lb. Hammer	Twiztid
2020	Various	Songs of Samhain	Murder Carnage (w/ Blaze Ya Dead Homie, Lex The Hex Master, & Boondox)	Jamie Madrox
2020	Various	Songs of Samhain	Death Talk	House Of Krazees
2020	Various	Songs of Samhain	Haddonfield 2 Crystal Lake	Twiztid
2020	Various	Songs of Samhain	In My Head	Twiztid
2020	Redd	Symphony Of Sympathy	Followers	Twiztid
2021	Gibby Stites	The 13th Wonder	I Heard You Got Signed	Jamie Madrox
2021	Gibby Stites	The 13th Wonder	Express Lane	Jamie Madrox
2021	Gibby Stites	The 13th Wonder	The Mission	Jamie Madrox
2021	Gibby Stites	The 13th Wonder	U Can Miss Me (w/ Blaze Ya Dead Homie & Boondox)	Jamie Madrox
2021	Gibby Stites	The 13th Wonder	Make Em Smile	Jamie Madrox
2021	Gibby Stites	The 13th Wonder	Feel This Way	Jamie Madrox
2021	Turncoat Dirty	Cryptodirt EP	Wait For Death	Jamie Madrox
2021	Intrinzik	Lasers And Poison	Losing My Mind	Twiztid
2021	Intrinzik	Lasers And Poison	Toy Gory 2	Jamie Madrox
2021	Scum	Out With The Old Vol.2: Collabz	Mind Of A Killa	Twiztid
2021	Checkmait	Non Album	You Never Know	Jamie Madrox
2021	Bukshot	Mobstyle Christmas	Animus	Twiztid
2021	Bukshot	Hell's Kitchen: Overdrive	Dark Paryers (w/Boondox & Young Wicked)	Twiztid
2022	Bukshot	Helter Skelter II	Hell On Halloween (w/Boondox & The R.O.C.)	Twiztid
2023	The Horde	The End Is Nigh	Grimace	Jamie Madrox
2023	The Horde	The End Is Nigh	Testaments	Monoxide
2024	Monoxide	The Chainsmoker II (Bonus Edition)	Not Normal	Jamie Madrox
2024	Monoxide	The Chainsmoker II (Bonus Edition)	B.M.A. (w/G-Mo Skee)	Jamie Madrox
2024	Monoxide	The Chainsmoker II (Bonus Edition)	The Night They All Died (w/The R.O.C.) (as House of Krazees)	Jamie Madrox
2024	The Underground Avengers	Oblivion	Other Side	Jamie Madrox
2024	Bukshot & Blaze Ya Dead Homie	Blockwork Morgue EP	Panicking (w/Lee Ali)	Jamie Madrox
2024	Bukshot & Blaze Ya Dead Homie	Blockwork Morgue EP	J.A.F.U.D. (remix)	Monoxide
2024	Jamie Madrox	The November Brain	Can You Hear Me Now	Monoxide

== Original contributions to compilations ==
- Psychopathic Sampler (1998) - "Whatthefuck"
- Phat or Wack Sampler (1998) - Mostasteless Snippets
- Psychopathics from Outer Space (2000) - "The Dirt Ball", "Murder, Murder, Murder", "Blam!", "She Ain't Afraid", "Red Neck Hoe '99", "Somebody's Dissin' U", "Old School Pervert", "Meat Cleaver"
- Juggalo Show Box Set (2001) - many skits and songs
- Hatchet History (2002) - "Second Hand Smoke", "Your The Reason", "Different"
- Big Money Hustlas Soundstrack (2002) - "Bury Me Alive", "Rock The Dead", "Spin The Bottle"
- Psychopathics from Outer Space 2 (2003) - "Hollywood, I'm Coming", "Demon Faces", "Yuwannahoe", "Free Studio"
- Gathering of The Juggalos EP (2005) - "Whatever It Takes"
- Psychopathics from Outer Space 3 (2007) - "My Addiction", "Zombie", "Hatchet Man"
- Psychopathic Sampler (2012) - "We Dont Die", "Woe Woe", "My Addictions"
- Psychopathic Psypher EP (2013) - all songs

== Collaboration albums ==
Artist	Release date	Title	Catalog #	US	US Indie	US Rap	US Heat	US R&B/Hip-Hop Albums	Tastemaker Albums
Psychopathic Rydas	December 1999	Dumpin'		—	—	—	—	—	—
Psychopathic Rydas	GOTJ 2001	Ryden Dirtay		—	46	—	—	—	—
Psychopathic Rydas	GOTJ 2001	The Ryda EP		—	—	—	—	—	—
Dark Lotus	July 17, 2001	Tales from the Lotus Pod	PSY-2700(Marz)/PSY-3010(ABK)	158	6	—	1	—	—
Dark Lotus	April 6, 2004	Black Rain	PSY-4024	71	3	—	—	—	—
Psychopathic Rydas	GOTJ 2004	Check Your Shit In Bitch!		—	—	—	—	—	—
Psychopathic Rydas	GOTJ 2004	Limited Edition EP		—	—	—	—	—	—
Psychopathic Rydas	GOTJ 2007	Duk Da Fuk Down		—	—	—	—	—	—
Dark Lotus	April 15, 2008	The Opaque Brotherhood	PSY-4603	45	4	7	—	23	15
Psychopathic Rydas	GOTJ 2011	EatShitNDie							
Psychopathic Rydas	GOTJ 2011	Backdoor Ryda EP		—	—	—	—	—	—
Dark Lotus	July 29, 2014	The Mud, Water, Air & Blood	PSY-48032	43	4	4	—	8	—
Triple Threat	May 11, 2017	Triple Threat EP	MNE-	—	—	—	—	—	—
Triple Threat	September 1, 2017	Triple Threat	MNE-	—	—	—	—	—	—
The Rydas	January 9, 2020	The Rydas	MNE-	—	—	—	—	—	—
Eastside Ninjas	June 4, 2021	Pact Of The 4	MNE-	—	—	—	—	—	—
Samhain Witch Killaz	September 29, 2024	Bloodletting EP	MNE-	—	—	—	—	—	—
House of Krazees	October 29, 2024	31	MNE-	—	—	—	—	—	—
House of Krazees	October 29, 2024	Shit 2 Make Your Ears Bleed	MNE-	—	—	—	—	—	—
