= Boondox discography =

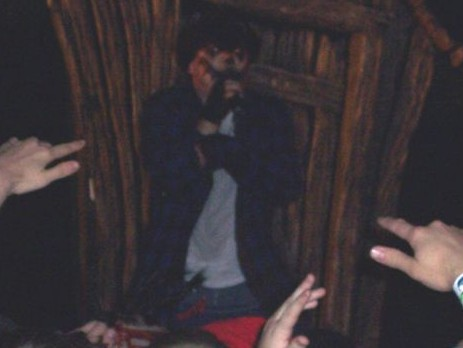
- Boondox performing at Hallowicked in 2006.
- Studio albums: 6
- Extended plays: 3

American rapper Boondox has released six studio albums and three extended plays. His music has been released through record labels Psychopathic Records and Majik Ninja Entertainment.

== Discography ==
=== Studio albums ===
Title	Peak chart positions			
Album details	US	US R&B/HH	US Indie	US Heat
The Harvest: Released: July 11, 2006; Label: Psychopathic; Formats: CD, digital download	—	—	—	—
Krimson Creek: Released: May 13, 2008; Label: Psychopathic; Formats: CD, digital download	113	—	—	1
South of Hell: Released: May 11, 2010; Label: Psychopathic; Formats: CD, digital download	54	—	—	—
Abaddon: Released: May 13, 2014; Label: Psychopathic; Formats: CD, digital download	147	—	—	—
The Murder: Released: March 17, 2017; Label: Majik Ninja; Formats: CD, digital download	74	—	—	—
Krimson Crow: Released: December 18, 2020; Label: Majik Ninja; Formats: CD, digital download	—	—	—	—

=== Extended plays ===
Title		Peak chart positions		
EP details	US	US R&B/HH	US Indie	US Heat
PunkinHed: Released: May 1, 2007; Label: Psychopathic; Formats: CD, digital download	54	—	—	—
Liquor, Lies & Legacy: Released: January 18, 2019; Label: Majik Ninja; Formats: CD, digital download	—	—	—	—
So Much Blood: Released: September 16, 2022; Label: Majik Ninja; Formats: CD, digital download	—	—	—	—
