= Lex The Hex Master discography =

Lex the Hex Master discography
- Studio albums: 3
- EPs: 4
- Singles: 6
- Mixtapes: 4

This is the discography of American rapper Lex the Hex Master from Queens, New York. As of 2020, he has released three studio albums, four extended plays, and four mixtapes.

== Albums ==
=== Studio albums ===
Title	Album details	Peak chart positions			
Title	Album details	US R&B	US Rap	US Indie	US Heat.
Born in Hell	Released: 2015	—	—	—	—
Contact	Released: November 11, 2016; Label: Majik Ninja Entertainment	23	13	27	3
Beyond Redemption	Released: October 31, 2017; Label: Majik Ninja Entertainment	—	—	—	—

=== Extended plays ===
Title	Album details	Peak chart positions		
Title	Album details	US R&B	US Indie	US Heat.
The Black Season	Released: February 4, 2016; Label: Majik Ninja Entertainment	40	49	10
Lex the Hex Master and the Unholy Trinity	Released: September 28, 2016; Label: Majik Ninja Entertainment	—	—	—
"Episode 1: Castle"	Released: June 17, 2020; Label: Majik Ninja Entertainment	—	—	—
Episode 2: Haunted Mansion	Released: September 18, 2020; Label: Majik Ninja Entertainment	—	—	—
Episode 3: Palace Of Illusions	Released: November 11, 2021; Label: Majik Ninja Entertainment	—	—	—

=== Mixtapes ===
Title	Album details
Mr. Ugly	Released: July 21, 2016; Label: Majik Ninja Entertainment
Mr. Ugly 2	Released: May 15, 2017; Label: Majik Ninja Entertainment
Shadow King	Released: August 27, 2018; Label: Majik Ninja Entertainment
Strictly for My Ninjas	Released: October 4, 2019; Label: Majik Ninja Entertainment

== Singles ==
Title	Year	Album
"Bomb on 'Em"	2015	The Black Season (EP)
"Ninjas"	2016	The Black Season (EP)
"They Call That Gangsta" (with Blaze Ya Dead Homie and The R.O.C.)	2016	The Casket Factory
"The Dojo" (with Twiztid, Blaze Ya Dead Homie and The R.O.C.)	2016	
"Marching in Fire" (with Sutter Kain)	2018	
"New Era" (with Sutter Kain)	2018	

== Music videos ==
Year	Song	Director
2015	"Bomb On 'Em"	Ryan Archibald
2015	"They Call That Gangsta"	J. Shaltz
2016	"Raw Shit"	
2016	"I Don't Like Your Face"	Kelley-Ann Bujold, Obsidian K., Lex the Hex Master
2016	"The Boss, the Teacher and the Preacher"	Roy Knyrim
2016	"Army of One"	Tom Vujcic
2017	"One Night"	
2017	"Masks of Torment"	Tom Vujcic
2017	"Samurai"	Ryan Watanabe
2018	"2 Middle Fingers"	
2018	"Jokes Ova"	Obsidian K.

== Guest appearances ==
Year	Song	Other performer(s)	Album
2016	"They Call That Gangsta"	Blaze Ya Dead Homie, The R.O.C.	The Casket Factory
2016	"Robbin' Hood"	Blaze Ya Dead Homie	The Casket Factory Tour VIP Exclusive Single
2016	"Merciless Assault"	Scum	One Track Mind
2016	"Little Girl Big Mouth"	Kung Fu Vampire	Look Alive
2017	"Outlined in Chalk"	Boondox, Twiztid, Blaze Ya Dead Homie, G-Mo Skee, Young Wicked	The Murder
2017	"One Step a Head"	Sami	Monster in Me
2017	"Too Long in the Dark"	Young Wicked	The Return of the Prodigal Son
2017	"Dark Matter"	Řezník	Strangulační Rýha
2017	"Revels in the Dark"	The R.O.C.	Digital Voodoo
2017	"Psychomania"	Twiztid, Blaze Ya Dead Homie, Boondox, G-Mo Skee, The R.O.C.	The Continuous Evilution of Life's ?'s
2017	"Trained to Kill"	The Flatlinerz, Ruste Juxx	Sinema
2017	"Masks of Torment"	Řezník	Sinema
2017	"Theatrikill"	Donnie Menace, J Reno, Adlib, DJ Eclipse	Sinema
2017	"Turn It Up"	Jamie Madrox, Blaze Ya Dead Homie, Bonez Dubb	Twiztid Presents: Year of the Sword
2017	"Don't Fxck With Us"	The R.O.C., ClockworC	Twiztid Presents: Year of the Sword
2017	"Better Than Ever B4"	G-Mo Skee, Blaze Ya Dead Homie, Axe Murder Boyz	Twiztid Presents: Year of the Sword
2017	"Beast"		Twiztid Presents: Year of the Sword
2017	"F.U.N. (Fuck You Niggas)"	Claas, Sicnoize D Nice	FMEFU
2018	"Piece of Shit"	Bukshot, Boondox, Insane Poetry	Weirdo: Pale Moon
2018	"Night Vision Pt. 2"	Sutter Kain, Apollo Valdez, Donnie Darko, Sabotawj	Dark Midnight
2019	"God Particle"	The Underground Avengers, Donnie Menace, Mr. Grey, ClockworC, UnderRated, Q Strange, Xtra Overdoze, Trizz, Lee Carver, Billy Obey, Joe Black, The Jokerr	Dark Matter
2019	"Sour Apple"	Xtra Overdoze	Viral Injection
2019	"Violent Stupidity"	Jake Palumbo	The Hundred-Thousandaire Hobo
2019	"Darkness Calling"	Řezník	Život A Smrt Alberta Hersche
2020	"Laughable"	Twiztid, Young Wicked	Revelashen
