= Cryptic Collection Vol. 4 =

2011 compilation album by Twiztid

Cryptic Collection 4

Compilation album by Twiztid
- Released: September 13, 2011
- Recorded: 2003–11
- Genre: Hip hop
- Length: 59:14
- Label: Psychopathic Records
- Producer: Eric Davie; Twiztid; Seven; Mike E. Clark; Fritz "The Cat"; Stircrazy

Twiztid chronology
Cryptic Collection: Holiday Edition (2009)	Cryptic Collection 4 (2011)	A Cut-Throat Christmas (2011)

Professional ratings
Review scores
Source	Rating
AllMusic	2.5/5 stars

Cryptic Collection 4 (abbreviated as CC4) is the sixth compilation album of Cryptic Collection series by American hip hop duo Twiztid. Released on September 13, 2011, through Psychopathic Records, a follow-up to 2009's Cryptic Collection: Holiday Edition, it served as a sequel to CC3 (2004). Among Twiztid's, production was handled by Eric Davie, Michael "Seven" Summers, Mike E. Clark, Fritz "The Cat" Van Kosky and Stircrazy. It features guest appearances from House of Krazees, Insane Clown Posse, Prozak, Anybody Killa, Boondox, E-40, Krizz Kaliko and Tech N9ne.

The album peaked at #108 on the Billboard 200, at #13 on the Top Rap Albums and at #17 on the Independent Albums in the United States.

== Track listing ==
No.	Title	Writer(s)	Producer(s)	Length
1.	"Magic Magic Ninja"	J. Spaniolo; P. Methric	Twiztid; Eric Davie	1:15
2.	"Big Money"	J. Spaniolo; P. Methric	Twiztid; Eric Davie	2:03
3.	"My Addiction"	J. Spaniolo; P. Methric	Mike E. Clark	3:28
4.	"Need Some Help" (featuring Tech N9NE, Prozak & Krizz Kaliko)	J. Spaniolo; P. Methric; A. Yates; S. Shippy; S. Watson	Mike E. Clark	3:42
5.	"Speculationz" (featuring E-40)	J. Spaniolo; P. Methric; E. Stevens	Monoxide Child	4:26
6.	"Gimme More" (featuring Insane Clown Posse)	J. Spaniolo; P. Methric; J. Bruce; J. Utsler	Michael "Seven" Summers	3:37
7.	"Hell on Earth"	J. Spaniolo; P. Methric	Eric Davie	3:09
8.	"Wild Out" (featuring The R.O.C.)	J. Spaniolo; P. Methric; B. Jones	Eric Davie	3:18
9.	"Hold on to Me" (featuring Boondox)	J. Spaniolo; P. Methric; D. Hutto	Eric Davie	4:34
10.	"Yuwannahoe"	J. Spaniolo; P. Methric	Fritz "The Cat"	3:26
11.	"Monster Inside" (featuring Prozak)	J. Spaniolo; P. Methric; S. Shippy	Eric Davie	3:52
12.	"Wake Up" (featuring Anybody Killa & The R.O.C.)	J. Spaniolo; P. Methric; J. Lowery; B. Jones	Monoxide Child	4:21
13.	"If They Don't Come for Me"	J. Spaniolo; P. Methric	Stircrazy	4:19
14.	"Hell Ride" (featuring Violent J)	J. Spaniolo; P. Methric; J. Bruce	Michael "Seven" Summers	3:49
15.	"Prey for Us"	J. Spaniolo; P. Methric	Eric Davie; Twiztid	2:56
16.	"Zombie"	J. Spaniolo; P. Methric	Michael "Seven" Summers	3:46
17.	"Moonlight"	J. Spaniolo; P. Methric	Eric Davie; Twiztid	3:13
Total length:				59:14

Notes

- Tracks 1 and 2 were recorded in 2003 and performed by characters of Big Stank (portrayed by Jamie Madrox) and Lil' Poot (portrayed by Monoxide) from John Cafiero's 2001 film Big Money Hustlas (2003)
- Tracks 3 and 16 appeared on Psychopathics From Outer Space Vol. 3 (2007)
- Track 4 appeared on the limited edition Fright Fest 2005 EP (2005)
- Track 5 appeared on Twiztid's album The Green Book (2003)
- Tracks 6 and 11 were tracks made specifically for the compilation (2011)
- Tracks 7, 9, and 14 appeared on the tour exclusive End of Days EP (2009)
- Tracks 8 and 13 appeared on the tour exclusive Toxic Terror EP (2008)
- Track 10 appeared on Psychopathics From Outer Space Vol. 2 (2003)
- Track 12 appeared on the limited edition Fright Fest 2003 EP (2003)
- Track 15 was a Twiztid song which was released as a single at New Years Evil 3 (2010)
- Track 17 was an outtake from Twiztid's album Independents Day (2007)

== Personnel ==
- Jamie "Madrox" Spaniolo – vocals, producer (tracks: 1, 2, 15, 17)
- Paul "Monoxide" Methric – vocals, producer (tracks: 1, 2, 5, 12, 15, 17)
- Steven T. Shippy – vocals (tracks: 4, 11)
- Aaron Dontez Yates – vocals (track 4)
- Samuel William Christopher Watson IV – vocals (track 4)
- Earl T. Stevens – vocals (track 5)
- Joseph Bruce – vocals (tracks: 6, 14)
- Joseph Utsler – vocals (track 6)
- Bryan Jones – vocals (tracks: 8, 12)
- David Hutto – vocals (track 9)
- James Lowery – vocals (track 12)
- Eric Davie – producer (tracks: 1, 2, 7–9, 11, 15, 17)
- Mike E. Clark – producer (tracks: 3, 4)
- Michael "Seven" Summers – producer (tracks: 6, 14, 16)
- Fritz Vankosky – producer (track 10)
- Stircrazy – producer (track 13)
- Jim Neve – artwork

== Charts ==
Chart (2011)	Peak position
US Billboard 200	108
US Top Rap Albums (Billboard)	13
US Independent Albums (Billboard)	17
