= The Casket Factory =

Studio album by Blaze Ya Dead Homie
- Released: January 15, 2016
- Recorded: 2015
- Studios: The Dojo; Nexus Audio; The Sweat Lodge; The Roach Motel
- Genre: Hardcore hip-hop
- Length: 1:00:06
- Labels: Grundy; Majik Ninja
- Producers: Fritz The Cat; Seven; The Dead Beatz

Blaze Ya Dead Homie chronology
Gang Rags: Reborn (2014)	The Casket Factory (2016)	Cadaver (2020)

Singles from The Casket Factory
- 1. "Ghost" Released: August 18, 2015; 2. "Wormfood" Released: August 21, 2015; 3. "They Call That Gangsta" Released: December 23, 2015; 4. "Who U Lookin' 4" Released: March 23, 2016; 5. "Eternal" Released: August 31, 2017

Professional ratings
Review scores
Source	Rating
AllMusic	3.5/5 stars

The Casket Factory is the sixth full-length solo studio album by American rapper Blaze Ya Dead Homie. It was released on January 15, 2016 via Grundy/Majik Ninja Entertainment, marking his second album for the label. Recording sessions took place at The Dojo Studio, Nexus Audio Recording Studio, The Sweat Lodge and The Roach Motel. Produced by Michael "Seven" Summers, Fritz The Cat and The Dead Beatz, it features guest appearances from Twiztid, Anybody Killa, Boondox, Kung Fu Vampire, Lex The Hex Master, The R.O.C. and DJ Swamp.

In the United States, the album peaked at number 89 on the Billboard 200, number 6 on the Top R&B/Hip-Hop Albums, number 5 on the Top Rap Albums and number 4 on the Independent Albums charts.

== Background ==
Shortly after the release of Gang Rags: Reborn, Blaze Ya Dead Homie announced in March 2015 that he would be releasing his new album in 2015 and that it would be titled The Casket Factory. In June 2015, he stated that the album would be released in 2015, but that the date would not be certain until after his tour with Kottonmouth Kings. A few days later, Twiztid said that the album was coming along nicely, and was nearing the finishing stages. At the 2015 Gathering of the Juggalos, during Twiztid's seminar, it was announced that The Casket Factory would be released on January 15, 2016.

== Singles and music videos ==
The lead single, "Ghost" featuring Kung Fu Vampire, was released on August 18, 2015, with the second single "Wormfood" being released three days later. The third single, "They Call That Gangsta", featuring Blaze's Zodiac MPrint cohort the R.O.C. and the newest Majik Ninja Entertainment signee Lex the Hex Master, was released on December 23, 2015 and it was accompanied by a music video. On January 30, 2016 the music video for "Wormfood" was released. On March 23, 2016, the fourth single "Who U Lookin 4?", featuring Boondox with Jamie Madrox on the hook, was released and was also accompanied by a music video. On August 31, 2017, the music video for "Eternal" was released.

== Track listing ==
No.	Title	Writer(s)	Producer(s)	Length
1.	"The Funeral (Introduction)"	Chris Rouleau; Jamie Spaniolo	Fritz The Cat	1:27
2.	"2Middle Fingers"	Rouleau; Spaniolo	Seven	2:51
3.	"Ghost" (featuring Kung Fu Vampire)	Rouleau; Spaniolo; Al Mind	The Dead Beatz	3:50
4.	"Call Now! (Commercial Break)"	Rouleau; Spaniolo	Fritz The Cat	1:07
5.	"The Way U Look B4 U Die"	Rouleau; Spaniolo	Seven	3:06
6.	"Ratchet" (featuring ABK)	Rouleau; Spaniolo; James Lowery	Seven	3:41
7.	"Eternal"	Rouleau; Spaniolo	The Dead Beatz	2:55
8.	"They Call That Gangsta" (featuring The R.O.C. and Lex The Hex Master)	Rouleau; Spaniolo; Bryan Jones; Jeremiah Johnson	Seven	3:46
9.	"Worm Food"	Rouleau; Spaniolo	Seven	3:01
10.	"Who U Lookin 4" (featuring Boondox)	Rouleau; Spaniolo; David Hutto	Seven	4:19
11.	"Unbreakable" (featuring Jamie Madrox)	Rouleau; Spaniolo	Seven	2:59
12.	"Electric Witch"	Rouleau; Spaniolo	Seven	4:09
13.	"Necromancy" (featuring Twiztid)	Rouleau; Paul Methric; Spaniolo	Seven	4:37
14.	"I Will Bury U!"	Rouleau; Spaniolo	Fritz The Cat	7:16
15.	"Casket Factory Interlude"	Rouleau; Spaniolo		0:30
16.	"Bleed"	Rouleau	Fritz The Cat	4:03
17.	"Gray & Blue" (featuring Prozak)	Rouleau; Spaniolo; Steven T. Shippy	Fritz The Cat	3:24
18.	"The Painted Man"	Rouleau	Fritz The Cat	3:05
Total length:				1:00:06

Notes

- Tracks 15 through 18 are considered bonus tracks.

== Personnel ==
- Christopher "Blaze Ya Dead Homie" Rouleau – lyrics, vocals (tracks: 2, 3, 5–14, 16–18)
- Jamie "Madrox" Spaniolo – lyrics (tracks: 1–15, 17), vocals (tracks: 3, 6, 10, 11, 13, 16, 17), additional vocals
- Al "Kung Fu Vampire" Mind – lyrics & vocals (track 3)
- James "Anybody Killa" Lowery – lyrics & vocals (track 6)
- Bryan "The R.O.C." Jones – lyrics & vocals (track 8)
- Jeremiah "Lex The Hex Master" Johnson – lyrics & vocals (track 8)
- David "Boondox" Hutto – lyrics & vocals (track 10)
- Paul "Monoxide" Methric – lyrics & vocals (track 13)
- Steven "Prozak" Shippy – lyrics & vocals (track 17)
- Dr. Rev. M. Persival Smint – vocals (track 1), additional vocals
- Randal Witsworth – vocals (track 4), additional vocals
- George Vlahakis – additional vocals, management
- Michael Winagar – additional vocals
- Matt Nipps – additional vocals
- Ronald "DJ Swamp" Keys Jr. – scratches (tracks: 5, 9, 11, 13)
- Fritz "The Cat" Vankosky – producer (tracks: 1, 4, 14, 16–18), recording, engineering
- Michael "Seven" Summers – producer (tracks: 2, 5, 6, 8–13)
- The Dead Beatz – producer (tracks: 3, 7)
- Defekt – recording (track 6)
- DJ Nemoz – recording (track 8)
- Ben Cybulsky – recording (track 17)
- Robert Rebeck – mixing
- Neil Simpson – mastering
- Eric Shetler – design
- Eric "E-Wolf" Wheeler – photography

== Charts ==
Chart (2016)	Peak position
US Billboard 200	89
US Top Album Sales (Billboard)	42
US Top R&B/Hip-Hop Albums (Billboard)	6
US Top Rap Albums (Billboard)	5
US Independent Albums (Billboard)	4
