= South of Hell =

South of Hell may refer to:

- South of Hell (TV series), a 2015 horror series
- South of Hell (Boondox album) (2010)
- South of Hell, a 2008 novel in P. J. Parrish's Louis Kincaid series
- South of Hell, a 2005 horror film by Wayne Crawford
- "South of Hell", a 1987 song from the Ded Engine album Hold A Grudge
