= Krimson Creek =

Studio album by Boondox
- Released: May 13, 2008
- Recorded: 2007–08
- Length: 1:00:20
- Label: Psychopathic
- Producers: Boondox, Darkeonz, Dr. Punch, Eric Davie, Kuma, Mike E. Clark, Scott Sumner, Tino, UnderRated

Boondox chronology
PunkinHed (2007)	Krimson Creek (2008)	South of Hell (2010)

Krimson Creek is the second studio album by the American rapper Boondox, released on May 13, 2008, by Psychopathic Records.

== Music and lyrics ==
Krimson Creek is a more personal work than The Harvest, with songs inspired by events from Boondox' life, including an incident in which his uncle tried to kill him by drowning him in a swimming pool, getting into fights at his school and experiments with drugs. The final track, "Death of a Hater", was inspired by negative reactions to his music. "I've read things where I've had people say, 'I hate him. I hope he dies. I hope his kids die' [...] I pretty much wrote a song about what I would do to those people". Banjo and harmonica are incorporated into the album's instrumentation.

== Reception ==
Professional ratings
Review scores
Source	Rating
AllMusic	3/5 stars

Reviewing the album for AllMusic, Anthony Tognazzini wrote, "Despite his unique getup, Boondox falls in line with labelmates Insane Clown Posse and Twiztid in his penchant for horror movie imagery and eerie atmospherics".

== Track listing ==
No.	Title	Lyrics	Music	Length
1.	"Intro"		Kuma; Boondox	2:11
2.	"Country Life"	David Hutto	Mike E. Clark; Tino	4:30
3.	"Untold/Unwritten"	Hutto	Kuma	3:58
4.	"Inbred Evil"	Hutto	Mike E. Clark	4:50
5.	"Freak Bitch"	Hutto	Darkeonz	3:31
6.	"Heathen"	Hutto	Kuma	3:20
7.	"Walking After Midnight" (featuring Insane Clown Posse)	Hutto; Joseph Bruce; Joseph Utsler	Eric Davie	4:05
8.	"Love/Hate"	Hutto	Mike E. Clark	3:39
9.	"Cold Cruel World"	Hutto	Kuma	4:36
10.	"Straight out the Crops"	Hutto	Dr. Punch	3:23
11.	"Outlaw"	Hutto	Scott Sumner	4:00
12.	"Path I Walk"	Hutto	UnderRated	3:49
13.	"Trailer Park Creepin'"	Hutto	Mike E. Clark; Tino	4:10
14.	"Fear" (featuring Monoxide Child and Blaze Ya Dead Homie)	Hutto; Paul Robert Methric; Chris Rouleau	Kuma	4:39
15.	"Death of a Hater" (featuring Jamie Madrox)	Hutto; James Spaniolo	Kuma	5:39
Total length:				1:00:20

== Personnel ==
- David "Boondox" Hutto – lyrics & vocals (tracks: 2–15), music (track 1), additional guitar
- Joseph "Violent J" Bruce – lyrics & vocals (track 7), music (track 10), engineering (tracks: 2–15)
- Joseph "Shaggy 2 Dope" Utsler – lyrics & vocals (track 7)
- Paul "Monoxide Child" Methric – lyrics & vocals (track 14)
- Chris "Blaze Ya Dead Homie" Rouleau – lyrics & vocals (track 14)
- James "Jamie Madrox" Spaniolo – lyrics & vocals (track 15)
- Juan Ramon "Razor Ray" Reyes – additional vocals & additional guitar
- Amanda Porter – additional vocals
- Brittney Squires – additional vocals
- Jake Polzia – additional vocals
- Brian Kuma – music (tracks: 1, 3, 6, 9, 14, 15)
- Michael Earl Clark – music (tracks: 2, 4, 8, 13)
- Martin "Tino" Gross – music (tracks: 2, 13)
- Darkeonz – music (track 5)
- Eric Davie – music (track 7), engineering (tracks: 2–15)
- Scott Sumner – music (track 11)
- Josh "UnderRated" Liederman – music (track 12)

== Charts ==
Chart (2008)	Peak position
US Billboard 200	113
US Independent Albums (Billboard)	13
US Top Rap Albums (Billboard)	12
US Heatseekers Albums (Billboard)	1
