= Kiran Bhakta Joshi =

American film director

Kiran Bhakta Joshi (born May 14, 1961) is an American film and television director, producer and visual effects artist. He is mostly known for his work on The Lion King and The Hunchback of Notre Dame and Mandala.

== Early life and career ==
Joshi was born in Kathmandu, Nepal. At the age of 19, Joshi moved to Los Angeles, California. He went to California State University Long Beach for his undergraduate and graduate degrees in Computer Science and Engineering. In 1991, Disney recruited him to work on Disney's Computer Animation Production System which led to his career in animation. He co-developed the herding system for the wildebeest stampede sequence in The Lion King. After supervising early production for animation legend Glen Keane on Tangled, Joshi left Disney in 2007 to start his own studio Incessant Rain Studios. In 2017, he produced and co-directed an award-winning documentary Moving Mountains: The Awakening which is based on Nepal's devastating 7.8 M earthquake that took place in April 2015. In 2019, Joshi directed and produced an animated short Mandala.

== Filmography ==
- Beauty and the Beast (1991)
- Aladdin (1992)
- The Lion King (1994)
- The Hunchback of Notre Dame (1996)
- Da Vinci's Demons (2013–2015)
- The Expendables 3 (2014)
- A Million Ways to Die in the West (2014)
- Kiki's Delivery Service (2014)
- Abaddon (2014)
- Chappie (2015)
- Beyond the Mask (2015)
- Moonbeam City (2015)
- Team Hot Wheels: Build the Epic Race (2015 TV Short)
- Everstar (2015 TV Short)
- Moving Mountains (Documentary) (2015)
- Da Vinci's Demons (TV Series) (2013–2015)
- Moving Mountains: The Awakening (Documentary) (2017)
- Snatch (2017)
- Emerald City (2017)
- Timeless (2018)
- Colony (2016–2018)
- Lucky Man (2018)
- The Meg (2018)
- Lost in Space (2018)
- Red Sparrow (2018)
- Asura (2018)
- A Series of Unfortunate Events (2018-2019)
- Tom Clancy's Jack Ryan (2018–2019)
- Watchmen (2019)
- Terminator: Dark Fate (2019)
- Malibu Rescue (2019)
- Summer of Rockets (2019)
- Mandala (Short) (2019)
- New Amsterdam (2018–2020)
- S.W.A.T. (2018-2020)
- Gangs of London (2020)
- Sacred Lies (2020)
- Mrs. America (2020)
