= Cryptic Collection =

- Pulpit cover

Compilation album by Twiztid
- Released: November 13, 2000
- Length: 49:07
- Label: Psychopathic Records

Twiztid chronology
Freek Show (2000)	Cryptic Collection (2000)	Cryptic Collection Vol. 2 (2001)

Alternate cover
- Serial Killaz cover

Cryptic Collection is a compilation album by American hip hop duo Twiztid. Released on November 13, 2000, it is the first in the Cryptic Collection series, followed by Cryptic Collection Vol. 2 and Vol. 3, each containing rare tracks not available on regular releases.

Cryptic Collection was later reissued with a new cover, intending to combine the original two, with the shadow representing the serial killaz cover.

== Track listing ==
#	Title	Time	Performer(s)
1	"Twiztid" (Intro2)	1:03	
2	"Whathefuck!?!?" (Extra Cripsy Mix)	3:51	Twiztid
3	"I Could"	1:02	Mr. Bones
4	"Ain't a Damn Thang Changed"	3:41	Twiztid
5	"Bad Dream"	3:01	Mr. Bones
6	"Somebody's Dissin' U" (Remix)	4:48	Twiztid; Blaze
7	"Blam!!!"	5:24	Mr. Bones
8	"Something Weird"	4:25	Mr. Bones
9	"Meat Cleaver"	4:24	Twiztid; ICP; Myzery
10	"Dr. Jekyl & Mr. Bones"	1:53	Mr. Bones
11	"Renditions of Reality" (Remix)	5:12	Twiztid
12	"Put It Down/Scare"	10:21	Blaze

Notes

- Track 1 was an alternate intro from Twiztid's debut album Mostasteless (1997)
- Tracks 2, 6, and 11 were remixes of the songs of the same name on Mostasteless (1997)
- Tracks 3, 5, 7, and 8 were part of Jamie Madrox's scrapped solo album as Mr. Bones, called Something Weird (1995)
- Track 4 was an outtake from the Mostasteless re-issue, talking about not being affected by fame and the new deal with Def Jam (1999)
- Track 9 appeared on the first version of Mostasteless and later on Psychopathics From Outer Space Vol. 1 (1997)
- Track 10 appeared on Jamie Madrox's 1995 solo album as Mr. Bones, Sacrifice, and the 1994 EP The Demon Inside by Mr. Bones and The Sons of Midnight (1994)
- Track 12 was two parts, the first one was a song by Psychopathic Records artist Blaze Ya Dead Homie, called "Put It Down", and the track was featured on Blaze's 2000 EP, titled Blaze Ya Dead Homie; The second part was an old song by House of Krazees with The R.O.C.'s verses cut (2000/199x)
