= Řezník (rapper) =

Czech rapper (born 1986)

- Also known as: Řezník, M.Engele
- Born: Martin Pohl; 1 October 1986 (age 39)
- Origin: Rumburk
- Genres: Hip hop; horrorcore
- Occupations: Rapper; singer; songwriter; director
- Years active: 2004–present
- Label: ZNK Production
- Website: ZNK.cz

Martin Pohl (born 1 October 1986, in Rumburk, Czechoslovakia), better known by his stage name Řezník (in English: Butcher) or M.Engele, is a Czech rapper, an exponent of the horrorcore genre in the Czech Republic. He is known for his provocative songs glorifying violence against women, homeless people, drug addicts, Ukrainians and gays. Řezník uses general horrorcore themes and he has collaborated with many interprets like King Gordy, Bizarre, Lex the Hex Master, Mastamind, Madchild, Necro, Ill Bill, Brotha Lynch Hung, Kung Fu Vampire, Insane Poetry, Twiztid, Sean Strange, Snowgoons, Scum, Razakel, Alla Xul Elu, Donnie Menace, Mr. Hyde, Geno Cultshit, The J. Hexx Project, Heaven, Psych Ward, Gorilla Voltage, members of Butcher's Harem, etc. According to a leaked poll result of the national Czech music award Český slavík, he won in 2013 in the category "Internet Star". He was, however, disqualified from the poll by the organizers, due to alleged objectionable conduct expressed in his songs. It led to protests of notable Czech artists, such as Tomáš Klus and Matěj Ruppert. On 29 November 2013, Tomáš Klus announced his departure from Český slavík, while Ruppert returned his own award which he received in 2006, accusing the organizers of censorship.

In 2011, Řezník and his colleagues, rappers Pitva (Autopsy) and Hrobka (Tomb) appeared at court, charged with racism and extremism expressed in their song Konečný řešení (Final Solution). The District Court for Prague 5 has dismissed all charges, pointing to constitutional rights such as freedom of expression or artistic expression. Jan Vučka, a Public Prosecutor, stated that "The police [charge] was based on the fact that you cannot make fun of certain things. However, this is not possible in a free country. It must be clear to everyone who listens to more than one of their songs that this is a hyperbole." The court also pointed to similar provocative artworks produced i.e. by creators of Monty Python, Happy Tree Friends, or Itchy and Scratchy. Řezník, Pitva and Hrobka emphasized that the song was meant to be a parodic exaggeration.

On 30 November 2013, a lawyer of the magazine Týden stated in an interview that Řezník's song Ta holka v mým sklepě (The Girl in My Cellar) contains objectionable passages constituting incitement to discrimination, hostility or violence. The interview had to be removed from the website of Týden on the next day because of death threats the lawyer received by the rapper's supporters.

== Discography ==
=== Studio albums ===
Title	Album details
Penetrační chtíč	Released: April 1, 2005; Label: ZNK
Hyperverzní zážitky z kremační pece	Released: June 6, 2006; Label: ZNK
Caviar Bukkake Fetus Exitus	Released: August 22, 2008; Label: ZNK
Vzestup zla	Released: December 20, 2010; Label: ZNK
Hudba, u Který se Chcípá	Released: May 22, 2012; Label: ZNK
Bateman / Muzeum Mentálních Kuriozit (Double Album)	Released: March 28, 2014; Label: ZNK
Říše za zrcadlem	Released: April 28, 2016; Label: ZNK
Strangulační Rýha	Released: October 31, 2017; Label: ZNK
Život A Smrt Alberta Hersche	Released: December 20, 2019; Label: ZNK
Straight Outta Sklep / Traumaplan (Double Album)	Released: March 29, 2021; Label: ZNK
Hrozny Hněvu	Released: October 1, 2024; Label: ZNK

=== Compilations ===
Title	Album details
Dva tucty pukavců	Released: December 20, 2010; Label: ZNK
Kompostárium	Released: October 31, 2017; Label: ZNK
Nucený Výsek	Released: October 1, 2024; Label: ZNK

== Other activities ==
Pohl developed, prior to his rapper career, a series of video games Život není krásný (Life isn't beautiful). He planned 14 titles but the series have only 7 games and number 8 called Život Není Krásný: Poslední Exekuce is on the way. Pohl also directed a few films including a film version of Život není krásný and Deprivační staniol.
