= We All Fall Down (album) =

Studio album by Prozak
- Released: September 17, 2013
- Recorded: 2012–2013
- Genre: Hip hop
- Length: 47:32
- Label: Strange Music
- Producer: Seven

Prozak chronology
Paranormal (2012)	We All Fall Down (2013)	Black Ink (2015)

Professional ratings
Review scores
Source	Rating
AllMusic	3.5/5 stars
RapReviews	7.5/10

We All Fall Down is the third studio album by American rapper Prozak. It was released on September 17, 2013, via Strange Music. Production was handled entirely by Seven, with Travis O'Guin serving as executive producer. The album debuted at number 122 on the Billboard 200, number 20 on the Top R&B/Hip-Hop Albums, number 11 on the Top Rap Albums and number 23 on the Independent Albums charts in the United States.

== Track listing ==
No.	Title	Writer(s)	Length
1.	"Divided We Stand"	Steven T. Shippy; Robert Rebeck; Michael Summers	3:25
2.	"Audio Barricade"	Shippy; Summers	3:34
3.	"Just Like Nothing"	Shippy; Tyler Lyon; Summers	4:11
4.	"The Ghost of Injustice" (Interlude)	Shippy; Summers	0:42
5.	"Blood Paved Road"	Shippy; Summers	4:10
6.	"Fading Away"	Shippy; Summers	3:54
7.	"Three, Two, One"	Shippy; Summers	3:12
8.	"Vendetta"	Shippy; Summers	2:48
9.	"Nowhere to Run"	Shippy; Rebeck; Summers	3:45
10.	"Distress Call"	Shippy; Summers	1:15
11.	"Darkest Shade of Grey"	Shippy; Rebeck; Summers	4:06
12.	"We All Fall Down"	Shippy; Summers	3:26
13.	"The Shadow Mortality" (Interlude)	Shippy; Summers	0:34
14.	"Time"	Shippy; Summers	3:40
15.	"Before We Say Goodbye"	Shippy; Lyon; Summers	4:50
Total length:			47:32

Strange Music online pre-order digital bonus track
No.	Title	Length
16.	"Catacomb"	4:36

== Personnel ==
- Steven "Prozak" Shippy — vocals, A&R
- Robert Rebeck — additional vocals (tracks: 1, 6, 8, 9, 11), guitar & bass (track 14)
- Michael "Seven" Summers — additional vocals (track 1), bass (tracks: 9, 15), guitar (track 10), piano (track 14), producer, A&R
- Taliah Kerreos — additional vocals (tracks: 1, 2)
- Eddie Goodsill — additional vocals (tracks: 1, 8)
- Antwine Webb — additional vocals (track 1)
- Ashton Summers — additional vocals (track 1)
- Brad Thies — additional vocals (track 1)
- Christina Summers — additional vocals (track 1)
- George Hunt — additional vocals (track 1)
- Jerry Jackson — additional vocals (track 1)
- Matt "Magnetic" Oleksiak — additional vocals (track 1)
- Matthew Locklear — additional vocals (track 1)
- Sacha Nan — additional vocals (track 1)
- Tyler Lyon — additional vocals (tracks: 3, 15)
- Dana Mitchell — additional vocals (track 5)
- Leshea Wright — additional vocals (track 5)
- Megan Smith — additional vocals (track 5)
- Michael Andrews — additional vocals (track 5)
- Paula Saunders — additional vocals (track 5)
- Twanetta Taylor — additional vocals (track 5)
- MissNissa — additional vocals (tracks: 6, 12)
- Crystal Clayton — additional vocals (track 14)
- Jace Wilbert — guitar (tracks: 9, 15)
- Ray Pollard — drums (track 14)
- Dave Weiner — associate producer
- Travis O'Guin — executive producer, A&R
- Robert Lieberman — legal
- Mark Reifsteck — booking

== Charts ==
Chart (2013)	Peak position
US Billboard 200	122
US Top R&B/Hip-Hop Albums (Billboard)	20
US Top Rap Albums (Billboard)	11
US Independent Albums (Billboard)	23
