= Nexus Audio Recording Studio =

Coordinates: 37°47′11″N 122°14′31″W

- Genre: Various (funk, rap, reggae, rock, etc.)
- Predecessor: Microdot Studio
- Founded: East Oakland, California (October 1, 2005)
- Founder: Chris Paxton
- Area served: San Francisco Bay Area
- Key people: Don Reynolds, Chris Paxton, Ant Petty
- Services: Music production, recording studio, mastering
- Website: nexusaudiostudio.com

Nexus Audio Recording Studio is a recording studio located in East Oakland, California. It was established in October 2004 by Chris Paxton, who presently owns, manages, and is the head engineer. The seven-room facility offers tracking, mixing and mastering for all audio projects, including musical genres as diverse as reggae and rock. Nexus is frequently used by artists in the San Francisco Bay Area urban music scene, and recording acts have included Kreayshawn, Mistah F.A.B, Spice 1, Turf Talk, Clyde Carson and Shock G.

== History ==
=== Building ===
1833 Solano Way, Oakland, CA, was built in the early 1920s, and became a recording studio in the early 1970s. Its central location to the Bay Area made it a destination for local and national acts such as Carlos Santana and Primus, who both used it for recording and rehearsals.

From 1996 to 2000, the studio was called Microdot Recording Studio under the ownership of engineer Jerry Smith. The floorplan and decor of the facility has stayed relatively unchanged, and includes a 20'x24'live room and 5'x5'isolated vocal booth. In June 2005, an additional three rooms serving as a control room, machine room, and ISO booth were added to the facility.

=== Nexus Audio ===
Drummer and engineer Chris Paxton (Kung Fu Vampire) purchased Microdot Studio in October 2005. A year later Nexus opened as a public recording studio, and the first album from the new facility was released in March 2007, titled The Connection.

The Live Room was given a new hardwood floor in July 2008, and in April 2009 there was a digital audio workstation upgrade to Pro Tools HD2. Nexus acquired adjacent rehearsal space for non-recording purposes in October 2010. One month later acoustic improvements were added to the main live room and control room. In September 2011 the rehearsal space began conversion into a mixing suite, and there were seven rooms total.

The Nexus track "Hands Up" by Erk tha Jerk started receiving regular radio rotation on 106.1 KMEL in April 2011. Later that summer, Kreayshawn's track "Gucci, Gucci" received over 5,000,000 views on YouTube, and the artist signed with Columbia Records/Sony Music Entertainment. Kung Fu Vampire recorded Love Bites at Nexus in July 2012, making the session into a short documentary.

== Key staff ==
- Chris Paxton: Owner/Head Engineer - graduate of Ex'pression College for Digital Arts with BAS in Sound Arts/Audio Engineering, Paxton has 14 years as a formally trained drummer. As of 2013 he is playing with Kung Fu Vampire, Conscious Souls, Whogas, Nexus and Rap is a Joke. He is endorsed by Amedia Cymbals, Axis Percussion and May International.
- Don Reynolds: Engineer - a graduate of Ex'pression College for Digital Arts with BAS in Sound Arts/Audio Engineering
- Anthony "Ant" Petty: Engineer - graduate of Ex’pression College for Digital Arts with BAS in Sound Arts.

== Clients ==
The following is a list of past and/or present clients at Nexus:

- Andy Milonakis
- Shock G
- Kreayshawn
- Kung Fu Vampire
- Rap is a Joke
- AP.9
- Goldie of The Federation
- Clyde Carson
- Erk The Jerk
- Mars
- Turf Talk
- Vic Da Baron
- Madness
- Dirt Bag Dan
- Jimmy Reign
- Mistah F.A.B
- Whogas
- The Blacklist Project
- Killa Tay
- Spice 1
- T-Nutty
- Thin Acid Angel
- Marvaless
- Lee Majors
- Hustla
- Equipto
- K. Flay
- Scoog
- WolfHawkJagur
- Bobby Tenna
- Sister Carol
- Hell Rell
- Steril-ion
- Hard Nox
- Enzyme Dynamite
- Dirt Nasty
- Rasun
- Robusto
- Son of Ran
- Agerman
- Black Letter Day
- Vic Da Baron
- Jacka
- Queen Dela
- Locksmith
- J. Stalin
- Lil Pump

== Discography ==
Releases recorded at Nexus
Year	Title	Artist	Label
2006	Give Thanks 4 Life	Bobby Tenna	Wildfyre Inc
2008	Da Mix Tape	Rap is a Joke	EastBaySick Productions
2008	Virtual Reality	Eastbaysick	EastBaySick Productions
2009	Whogas	Whogas	Dreadhawk Music
2010	Twothousandandten	Various	QCI Records
2010	Reality Check	AP.9	Mob Shop Records
2011	Nerd's Eye View	Erk tha Jerk	SMC Records
2011	Avante Garde	Above The Mainstream	--
2011	I'm Looking for Someone New	Toby	Pailboy Productions
2011	Relentless	AP.9	Mob Shop Ent
2012	Hunter Poetry	WolfHawkJaguar	Clear Label Records
2012	Somethin' 'Bout Kreay	Kreayshawn	Sony/Columbia Records
2012	Love Bites	Kung Fu Vampire	Mad Insanity Records
