= Potluck (group) =

American hip hop group

- Origin: Arcata, California
- Genres: Hip hop
- Years active: 2001 - January 13, 2017
- Label: Suburban Noize
- Members: 1 Ton; UnderRated

Potluck was an underground hip hop music group made of American rappers, Underrated (born Joshua R. Leiderman) and 1 Ton (born James Nnaemeka Kerri). Potluck released 6 studio albums, Humboldt County High, Tha Lost Koast Kollective, Harvest Time, Straight Outta Humboldt, Pipe Dreams, and most recently Rhymes & Resin. Pipe Dreams, released February 10, 2009, appeared on the Billboard Top Heatseekers chart at #30 on February 28, 2009. Throughout their career, Potluck has toured with artists such as King Gordy, Twiztid, E-40, Tech N9ne, Lloyd Banks of G-Unit, Bone Thugs-n-Harmony, Hed PE, Boondox, Prozak, and the Kottonmouth Kings.

== Meaning Behind the Name ==
Hailing from Humboldt County, California, known largely in California for the harvesting and routine consumption of "pot" or cannabis, Potluck promoted the cannabis lifestyle. Both artists have their Prop. 215 cards. Most of their songs, like most artists on the Suburban Noize record label, are about growing and/or smoking the plant.

"The name 'Potluck' doesn't mean 'a gathering with food,' it refers to the multiple ethnic groups that joined together to make their albums, almost like a potluck of ideas instead of food from a collection of cultures."—Underrated.

Potluck has collaborated with other artists such as the Luniz, Mr. GARTH-culti-VADER, Mali aka Mally, the Kottonmouth Kings, Stranger Haze, 4Saken, Playaz Lounge Crew, Tech N9ne, King Gordy, Glasses Malone, Krizz Kaliko, T-Trash, D12, Hed PE, Twiztid, T.O.N.E-z, Brokencyde etc. who are also described as marijuana "activists". Underrated also acts as the group's producer, making most of the beats, and 1 Ton is in charge of touring.

== Discography ==
Year	Album	Record label
2001	Humboldt County High	The Orchard
2002	Tha Lost Koast Kollective	Lost Koast Productions
2004	Harvest Time	Lost Koast Productions
2006	Straight Outta Humboldt	Suburban Noize Records
2009	Pipe Dreams	Suburban Noize Records
2011	Rhymes & Resin	Suburban Noize Records
2012	The Humboldt Chronicles (THC) Mixtape	Self-Released
2015	#StonerProblems	Cd Baby Records

== Collaborations ==
Year	Album	Record label	Collaborated with
2009	Pothead Music Vol.1 - The Dank Alumni Experience	Suburban Noize Records	The Dank Alumni
