= PunkinHed =

EP by Boondox
- Released: May 1, 2007
- Recorded: 2006–2007
- Length: 24:48
- Label: Psychopathic
- Producers: Boondox; Brian Kuma; Dr. Punch; Mike E. Clark; Polar Bear; Seven; Tino Grosse

Boondox chronology
The Harvest (2006)	PunkinHed (2007)	Krimson Creek (2008)

PunkinHed is an extended play by the American rapper Boondox, released on May 1, 2007, by Psychopathic Records.

== Reception ==
Professional ratings
Review scores
Source	Rating
RapReviews	5/10

Steve "Flash" Juon wrote for RapReviews, "I didn’t hate PunkinHed but I don’t find myself eager to revisit it". He also noted that "Southern Nights" illustrated that Boondox was "a strange fit" for Psychopathic, as Boondox's combination of "drunk in the Waffle House" lyrics and instrumentation that incorporated banjos and harmonicas, had more in common with Bubba Sparxxx than any of his labelmates; further, songs like "Suffering" see Boondox "[attempting] to get as dark and gothic" as his labelmates, "and [he is] convincing enough to pass".

== Track listing ==
All tracks are written by David Hutto, except track 6 is written with Brian Kuma and track 7 is written with Mike E. Clark.

No.	Title	Producer(s)	Length
1.	"Resurrection"	Akuma; Boondox	0:53
2.	"PunkinHed"	Michael "Seven" Summers	3:32
3.	"Sleep Stalker"	Polar Bear	3:31
4.	"Southern Nights"	Mike E. Clark; Tino Grosse	3:37
5.	"Suffering"	Mike E. Clark	4:57
6.	"They Pray with Snakes" (Remix)	Boondox; Dr. Punch	4:19
7.	"Seven" (Remix)	Boondox; Dr. Punch	3:59
Total length:			24:48

== Personnel ==
- David "Boondox" Hutto – lyrics, vocals, producer (tracks: 1, 6, 7)
- Joseph "Violent J" Bruce – additional vocals (tracks: 3, 4)
- Carlito Hill – additional vocals (track 7)
- Savannah Hill – additional vocals (track 7)
- Juan Ramon "Razor Ray" Reyes – guitar & harmonica (track 4)
- Brian Kuma – producer (track 1), mixing (tracks: 1–4, 6, 7), programming (track 6), engineering (tracks: 6, 7)
- Michael "Seven" Summers – producer (track 2)
- Polar Bear – producer (track 3)
- Mike E. Clark – producer (tracks: 4, 5), re-mixing (track 6), programming (track 7)
- Martin "Tino" Gross – producer (track 4)
- Dr. Punch – producer (tracks: 6, 7), mixing (tracks: 2–7), engineering (tracks: 6, 7)
- Fritz "The Cat" Van Kosky – mixing (tracks: 1, 2, 4–7), engineering (track 7)
- Michael "DJ Clay" Velasquez – re-mixing (track 7)

== Charts ==
Chart (2007)	Peak position
US Independent Albums (Billboard)	27
US Heatseekers Albums (Billboard)	10
