= Black Ink =

2015 studio album by American rapper Prozak

Studio album by Prozak
- Released: October 9, 2015
- Recorded: 2015
- Genre: Hip hop
- Length: 47:08
- Label: Strange Music
- Producer: Travis O'Guin (exec.); Seven

Prozak chronology
We All Fall Down (2013)	Black Ink (2015)

Singles from Black Ink
- 1. "Your Creation" Released: September 2, 2015; 2. "Purgatory" Released: September 24, 2015; 3. "The Plague" Released: September 30, 2015

Professional ratings
Review scores
Source	Rating
HipHopDX	3/5

Black Ink is the fourth studio album by American rapper Prozak. It was released on October 9, 2015 via Strange Music. Production was handled entirely by Seven, with Travis O'Guin serving as executive producer. It features guest appearances from Krizz Kaliko, Ces Cru, Mackenzie O'Guin, Tech N9ne, Bernz, Blaze Ya Dead Homie, Kate Rose, Madchild, The R.O.C., Twiztid, Tyler Lyon and Wrekonize.

== Background ==
The album was available for pre-order on August 18, 2015 with extra track "Nobody's Fool".

The origin of the album's title was described by Prozak himself as: "Black Ink came from a lot of things actually but essentially I was watching a documentary and there was a gentleman talking about the moment of death and he had actually passed away for five minutes and he described it as black ink being poured into his eyes".

The album's lead single, "Your Creation", was released on September 2 with an accompanying music video dropped on October 7. Its second single, "Purgatory", was released on September 24, and "The Plague" was dropped on September 30 as the third single.

== Track listing ==
No.	Title	Writer(s)	Length
1.	"The Abyss" (Intro)	Steven T. Shippy; Mackenzie Nicole O'Guin; Michael Summers	0:54
2.	"Purgatory" (featuring Tech N9NE and Krizz Kaliko)	Shippy; Aaron D. Yates; Samuel Watson; Summers	4:49
3.	"War Within" (featuring Ces Cru)	Shippy; Donnie King; Mike Viglione; Summers	3:43
4.	"Tomorrow" (featuring Krizz Kaliko)	Shippy; Watson; Summers	3:58
5.	"Do You Know Where You Are?" (featuring Tech N9NE and Twiztid)	Shippy; Yates; Jamie Spaniolo; Paul Methric; Summers	4:48
6.	"House of Cards" (featuring Kate Rose)	Shippy; Kathryn Caggianelli; Summers	3:47
7.	"Erased" (featuring Mackenzie O'Guin)	Shippy; O'Guin; Summers	3:14
8.	"Killing Me" (featuring Krizz Kaliko, Blaze Ya Dead Homie and The R.O.C.)	Shippy; Watson; Chris Rouleau; Bryan Jones; Summers	3:42
9.	"The Plague" (featuring Madchild and Ubiquitous)	Shippy; Shane Bunting; Viglione; Summers	3:26
10.	"My Life" (featuring Wrekonize and Bernz)	Shippy; Benjamin Miller; Bernardo Garcia; Summers	3:14
11.	"Black Ink" (featuring Mackenzie O'Guin)	Shippy; O'Guin; Summers	3:52
12.	"People of the Outside" (featuring Tyler Lyon)	Shippy; Tyler Lyon; Summers	3:35
13.	"Your Creation"	Shippy; Summers	4:06
Total length:			47:08

Strange Music pre-order track
No.	Title	Length
14.	"Nobody's Fool"	3:00
