= Pipe Dreams (Potluck album) =

Studio album by Potluck
- Released: February 10, 2009
- Genre: Hip hop
- Length: 1:12:37
- Label: Suburban Noize
- Producer: Chris Regan; Jeffrey Simmons Jr.; Pharmacist Chris; UnderRated

Potluck chronology
Straight Outta Humboldt (2006)	Pipe Dreams (2009)	Rhymes and Resin (2011)

Professional ratings
Review scores
Source	Rating
AllMusic	3.5/5 stars
PopMatters	6/10
RapReviews	7.5/10

Pipe Dreams is the fourth studio album by American hip hop duo Potluck. It was released on February 10, 2009 through Suburban Noize Records, marking the duo's second album for the label. Production was handled by member UnderRated, as well as Pharmacist Chris, Jeffrey Simmons Jr. and Chris Regan. It features guest appearances from Krizz Kaliko, Garth Vader, Kottonmouth Kings, Twiztid, Cool Nutz, Ishi Dube and James Boy.

The album debuted at number 30 on the Billboard Heatseekers Albums chart in the United States.

A music video for the song "Stoner Bitch" was released on YouTube on February 3, 2009.

== Track listing ==
No.	Title	Writer(s)	Producer(s)	Length
1.	"Welcome 2 the Movement"	Joshua R. Leiderman; James Kerri; Chris Regan	Chris Regan	2:31
2.	"Stoner Bitch" (featuring Kottonmouth Kings)	Leiderman; Kerri; Tim McNutt; Brad Xavier		4:37
3.	"No Disrespect"	Leiderman; Kerri; Bamian Davis		3:32
4.	"I Can Do Anything"	Leiderman; Kerri; Chris Elliott	Pharmacist Chris	4:08
5.	"Real Love"	Leiderman; Kerri; James Calderon	UnderRated	3:59
6.	"Meet Joe Brown" (Skit)	Leiderman; Kerri		0:49
7.	"Shut the Fuck Up"	Leiderman; Kerri; Aaron Abeyta	UnderRated; Jeffrey Simmons Jr.	4:04
8.	"Hot Box Anthem" (featuring Mr. Garth-Culti-Vader)	Leiderman; Kerri; Garth Ian Hudson; Chris Carrol; Chris Elliot		5:12
9.	"I Gotta Problem"	Leiderman; Kerri; Abeyta	UnderRated; Jeffrey Simmons Jr.	3:44
10.	"Funny Shit"	Leiderman; Kerri	UnderRated	3:21
11.	"The Struggle"	Leiderman; Kerri; Terrance Scott; Donti Ceruti	UnderRated	4:29
12.	"She Don't Wanna Fuck Wit Me" (featuring Krizz Kaliko)	Leiderman; Kerri; Samuel Watson		4:41
13.	"Classroom" (Skit)	Leiderman; Kerri		1:05
14.	"I Say Yes to Drugs"	Leiderman; Kerri; Steven Mitchell	UnderRated	4:01
15.	"Computer Love"	Leiderman; Kerri; Elliott	Pharmacist Chris	3:27
16.	"Be Easy" (featuring Krizz Kaliko)	Leiderman; Kerri; Watson; Elliott		3:36
17.	"Smoke the Pain Away" (featuring Twiztid)	Leiderman; Kerri; Jamie Spaniolo; Paul Methric		5:05
18.	"News Broadcast" (Skit)	Leiderman; Kerri		0:32
19.	"There's No Limit"	Leiderman; Kerri	UnderRated	3:12
20.	"My Dad"	Leiderman; Kerri	UnderRated	3:29
21.	"2 Minute Drill"	Leiderman	UnderRated	3:03
Total length:				1:12:37

== Charts ==
Chart (2009)	Peak position
US Heatseekers Albums (Billboard)	30
