= The Black Season (EP) =

The Black Season EP

EP by Lex "The Hex" Master
- Released: The Casket Factory Tour (February 4, 2016–March 13, 2016); April 8, 2016 (digitally)
- Recorded: 2015
- Studio: The Dojo
- Genre: Gangsta rap, hardcore hip hop, horrorcore, indie hip hop
- Length: 20:26
- Label: Majik Ninja Entertainment
- Producer: Twiztid (exec.); De Elusive; Seven; Fritz the Cat

Lex "The Hex" Master chronology
The Black Season EP (2016)	Mr. Ugly (2016)

Singles from The Murder
- 1. "Bomb On 'Em" Released: October 22, 2015; 2. "Ninjas" Released: January 8, 2016; 3. "Raw Shit" Released: September 7, 2016

The Black Season EP is the debut extended play by American rapper Lex "The Hex" Master. The EP was originally released exclusively during Blaze Ya Dead Homie's The Casket Factory tour which ran from February 4, 2016, through March 13, 2016. It would later be released digitally on April 8, 2016.

It charted on the Billboard Top Independent Albums at No. 49, the Top R&B/Hip-Hop Albums at No. 40 and the Top Heatseekers Albums at No. 10.

== Background ==
In October 2015 in the fall 2015 MNE Sampler, it was revealed that the new artist is named Lex "The Hex" Master.

In January 2016 it was announced that Lex "The Hex" Master would be going on tour with Blaze Ya Dead Homie on his The Casket Factory Tour to promote The Casket Factory. It was also announced that Lex "The Hex" Master would be releasing his debut EP on the tour titled The Black Season EP.

== Promotion and release ==
To promote the EP, the song "Bomb On Em'" was released in October 2015.

The EP was released on The Casket Factory Tour (February 4, 2016 – March 13, 2016) and then was available for sale on Twiztid-Shop.com.

== Singles ==
The first single from the EP was Bomb On Em and was accompanied by a music video on October 22, 2015.

On January 8, 2016, the second single from the EP was released titled Ninjas.

On September 7, 2016, the first music video from the EP for the song Raw Shit.

== Track listing ==
1. "Intro" – 1:20
2. "Raw Shit" (featuring Monoxide Child) – 4:31
3. "Ninjas" – 3:51
4. "Bomb On Em" – 3:07
5. "Anarchy" – 3:36
6. "The Outside" – 3:51

== Personnel ==
- Lex "The Hex" Master – performer
- Paul Robert Methric – vocals (track 2), executive producer
- De Elusive – producer (tracks: 1–5)
- Michael "Seven" Summers – producer (track 6)
- Fritz "The Cat" Vankosky – additional producer (tracks: 2, 3, 6), engineering
- Rob Rebeck – mixing
- Neil Simpson – mastering
- James "Madrox" Spaniolo – executive producer
- Eric Shetler – design
- George Vhalakis – management

== Charts ==
Chart (2016)	Peak position
US Top Independent Albums	49
US Top R&B/Hip-Hop Albums	40
US Top Heatseekers Albums	10
