= Straight Outta Humboldt =

Studio album by Potluck
- Released: September 19, 2006
- Recorded: 2004–2006
- Genre: Hip hop
- Length: 1:19:20
- Label: Suburban Noize
- Producer: Jeffrey Simmons Jr.; UnderRated

Potluck chronology
Harvest Time (2004)	Straight Outta Humboldt (2006)	Pipe Dreams (2009)

Straight Outta Humboldt is the third studio album by American hip hop duo Potluck. It was released on September 19, 2006 via Suburban Noize Records, marking the duo's first album for the label. Production was mostly handled by member UnderRated. It features guest appearances from E-40, Garth Vader, Kottonmouth Kings, Krizz Kaliko, Luniz, Tech N9NE and Twiztid among others.

== Critical reception ==
Professional ratings
Review scores
Source	Rating
PopMatters	6/10
RapReviews	7/10

Jason De Zilva of RapReviews resumed that the album "has everything to appease hardcore left-coast listeners, satisfy long-time fans and weed-heads, and rake in new heads who live for that melancholic melody laced with great verses and fitting samples". Quentin B Huff of PopMatters wrote that the album is "loaded with gargantuan West Coast O.G. funk, sped-up samples, seriously catchy hooks, and -- yes, of course -- weed". Thomas Quinlan of Exclaim! called the songs "a little boring overall", but praised "Revolution" as the album's highlight.

== Track listing ==
No.	Title	Writer(s)	Length
1.	"Rock the World"	Joshua R. Leiderman; James Kerri	2:32
2.	"Get High"	Leiderman; Kerri; Derrick Brown	3:56
3.	"Fire"	Leiderman; Kerri	3:37
4.	"The Magazine Interview" (Skit)	Leiderman; Kerri	1:19
5.	"Mary Jane"	Leiderman; Kerri; Garrick Husbands; Jerold Ellis	4:39
6.	"Money Makes the World Go 'Round"	Leiderman; Kerri; James Calderon; Aaron Abeyta	3:38
7.	"Dank Alumni"	Leiderman; Kerri; Chris Carrol; Chris Elliott; Rollin Goering; Garth Ian Hudson	6:09
8.	"My Life"	Leiderman; Kerri	3:27
9.	"What We Are"	Leiderman; Kerri; Samuel Watson; Aaron Yates	4:19
10.	"U Ain't That Fine"	Leiderman; Kerri; Earl Stevens; Bosko Kante	4:02
11.	"Meeting with the Boss" (Skit)	Leiderman; Kerri	1:10
12.	"Roll Big"	Leiderman; Kerri; Tim McNutt; Brad Xavier; Abeyta	4:16
13.	"Doing Alright"	Leiderman; Kerri; Brown	4:16
14.	"Welcome 2 Humboldt"	Leiderman; Kerri; Robert Gilliam; Brian Swislow	3:52
15.	"Love Me"	Leiderman; Kerri	3:55
16.	"Revolution"	Leiderman; Kerri; Charles Stewart	4:08
17.	"Phone Calls" (Skit)	Leiderman; Kerri	1:45
18.	"Marijuana 101"	Leiderman; Kerri; James Spears	4:14
19.	"One Day"	Leiderman; Kerri; Aaron Turley; Vanillaroma; Abeyta	3:14
20.	"Our History"	Leiderman; Kerri	4:50
21.	"Interlude"	Leiderman; Kerri	0:57
22.	"Funeral"	Leiderman; Kerri; Jamie Spaniolo; Paul Methric; Elliott	5:05
Total length:			1:19:20
