= Paranormal (Prozak album) =

Studio album by Prozak
- Released: April 24, 2012
- Recorded: 2011–2012
- Genre: Hip-hop; rap rock
- Length: 57:14
- Label: Strange Music
- Producer: Ben Cybulsky; Bradford Fielder; Étienne Cousineau; Jason Arnold; Mike E. Clark; Robert Rebeck; Seven

Prozak chronology
Tales from the Sick (2008)	Paranormal (2012)	We All Fall Down (2013)

Professional ratings
Review scores
Source	Rating
AllMusic	3.5/5 stars
RapReviews	8/10

Paranormal is the second studio album by American rapper Prozak. It was released April 24, 2012, through Strange Music. Production was handled by Seven, Robert Rebeck, Ben Cybulsky, Bradford Fielder, E'tienne Cousineau, Jason Arnold and Mike E. Clark. It features guest appearances from Tech N9NE, Krizz Kaliko, Twiztid and MissNissa. The album debuted at number 90 on Billboard 200, number 13 on Top R&B/Hip-Hop Albums, number 8 on Top Rap Albums and number 15 on Independent Albums charts in the United States.

== Track listing ==
No.	Title	Writer(s)	Producer(s)	Length
1.	"Paranormal" (Skit)	Steven T. Shippy	Ben Cybulsky	0:29
2.	"Prepare for the Worst"	Shippy; Robert Rebeck	Robert Rebeck	2:57
3.	"End of Us"	Shippy; Bradford Fielder; Étienne Cousineau; Jason Arnold	Bradford Fielder; Étienne Cousineau; Jason Arnold	3:03
4.	"Tell a Tale of Two Hearts" (featuring MissNissa)	Shippy; Michael Summers	Seven	4:27
5.	"Line in the Middle" (featuring Twiztid)	Shippy; Jamie Spaniolo; Paul Methric; Summers	Seven	3:46
6.	"Farewell"	Shippy; Summers	Seven	3:27
7.	"Fuck You"	Shippy; Summers	Seven	3:28
8.	"Perception Deception"	Shippy; Michael Earl Clark	Mike E. Clark	3:13
9.	"Enemy" (featuring Tech N9ne)	Shippy; Aaron D. Yates; Rebeck	Robert Rebeck	3:43
10.	"Wake Up You're Dead"	Shippy; Rebeck	Robert Rebeck	3:44
11.	"Hate"	Shippy; Summers	Seven	3:27
12.	"Until Then"	Shippy; Summers	Seven	3:38
13.	"Million Miles Away"	Shippy; Summers	Seven	3:23
14.	"Turn Back"	Shippy; Summers	Seven	3:37
15.	"Full Moon"	Shippy; Summers	Seven	3:14
16.	"One of These Days" (featuring Tech N9ne and Krizz Kaliko)	Shippy; Yates; Samuel Watson; Summers	Seven	3:51
17.	"Alien"	Shippy; Rebeck	Robert Rebeck	3:47
Total length:				57:14

Strange Music pre-order bonus track
No.	Title	Writer(s)	Length
18.	"Last Will & Testament"	Shippy	3:19

== Charts ==
Chart (2012)	Peak position
US Billboard 200	90
US Top R&B/Hip-Hop Albums (Billboard)	13
US Top Rap Albums (Billboard)	8
US Independent Albums (Billboard)	15
