= The Murder (album) =

Studio album by Boondox
- Released: March 24, 2017
- Recorded: 2015–17
- Studios: The Dojo; Undercaste Studios
- Length: 50:28
- Label: Majik Ninja
- Producers: Seven; WLPWR

Boondox chronology
| Abaddon (2014) | The Murder (2017) | Liquor, Lies & Legacy (2019) |

Singles from The Murder
- 1. "PYEO (Peck Your Eyes Out)" Released: December 10, 2016; 2. "Free Soul" Released: February 3, 2017; 3. "Bloodletting" Released: February 24, 2017; 4. "Born in Fire" Released: March 9, 2017; 5. "Outlined in Chalk" Released: March 23, 2017; 6. "Throw Away" Released: March 24, 2017

The Murder is the fifth studio album by the American rapper Boondox, released on March 24, 2017, by Majik Ninja Entertainment.

== Track listing ==
| No. | Title | Writer(s) | Producer(s) | Length |
|---|---|---|---|---|
| 1. | "Welcome" | James Spaniolo | | 1:39 |
| 2. | "Peck Your Eyes Out" | David Hutto; Spaniolo | Seven | 3:07 |
| 3. | "Throw Away" (featuring Jamie Madrox) | Hutto; Spaniolo | WLPWR | 3:20 |
| 4. | "Bloodletting" | Hutto | Seven | 3:07 |
| 5. | "Feed the Machine" | Hutto; AJAX | Seven | 3:58 |
| 6. | "Free Soul" | Hutto; Spaniolo | Seven | 4:12 |
| 7. | "Purge" (featuring Twiztid) | Hutto; Spaniolo; Paul Methric | Seven | 3:24 |
| 8. | "Cannibalistic Prodigal Misfit" | Hutto | Seven | 2:55 |
| 9. | "Born in Fire" (featuring Jamie Madrox, Bubba Sparxxx and Struggle) | Hutto; Spaniolo; Warren Anderson Mathis; Will Harness | Seven | 5:20 |
| 10. | "I'm a Mess" | Hutto | Seven | 3:15 |
| 11. | "Outlined in Chalk" (featuring Twiztid, Blaze Ya Dead Homie, The R.O.C., G-Mo Skee, Lex The Hex Master and Young Wicked) | Hutto; Spaniolo; Methric; Chris Rouleau; Bryan Jones; Jaron Johnson; Jeremiah Johnson; James Garcia | Seven | 5:07 |
| 12. | "Sittin' on the Porch" (featuring Jamie Madrox) | Hutto; Spaniolo | Seven | 3:43 |
| 13. | "They Don't Understand" (featuring Jamie Madrox) | Hutto; Spaniolo | Seven | 3:30 |
| 14. | "Terminus" (featuring Jamie Madrox) | Hutto; Spaniolo | Seven | 3:51 |
| Total length: | | | | 50:28 |

== Personnel ==
- David "Boondox" Hutto – main artist
- James "Jamie Madrox" Spaniolo – featured artist (tracks: 3, 7, 9, 11–14)
- Paul Robert "Monoxide Child" Methric – featured artist (tracks: 7, 11)
- Warren Anderson "Bubba Sparxxx" Mathis – featured artist (track 9)
- Will "Struggle Jennings" Harness – featured artist (track 9)
- Bryan "The R.O.C." Jones – featured artist (track 11)
- Chris "Blaze Ya Dead Homie" Rouleau – featured artist (track 11)
- James "Young Wicked" Garcia – featured artist (track 11)
- Jaron "G-Mo Skee" Johnson – featured artist (track 11)
- Jeremiah "Lex The Hex Master" Johnson – featured artist (track 11)
- Dustin Pruitt – additional vocals (tracks: 1, 4, 8–10, 12)
- Jake Polzin – additional vocals (tracks: 3, 10)
- Michael "Seven" Summers – producer (tracks: 2, 4–14)
- William "WLPWR" Washington – producer (track 3)
- Fritz "The Cat" Van Kosky – recording and engineering (tracks: 1, 3, 4, 6–8, 10, 11)
- Elliot Eide – recording and engineering (tracks: 2, 5, 9, 12–14)
- Robert Rebeck – mixing (tracks: 1, 5, 7–14)
- Chris Paxton – mixing (tracks: 2–4, 6)
- Neil Simpson – mastering
- Marc Nader – photography
- Amanda Duchow – photography
- Eric Shetler – design and layout
- George Vlahakis – management

== Charts ==
| Chart (2017) | Peak position |
|---|---|
| US Billboard 200 | 74 |
| US Top R&B/Hip-Hop Albums (Billboard) | 36 |
| US Top Album Sales (Billboard) | 17 |
| US Independent Albums (Billboard) | 3 |
