= Abaddon (album) =

Studio album by Boondox
- Released: May 13, 2014
- Recorded: 2011–14
- Length: 56:38
- Label: Psychopathic
- Producers: Brian Kuma; Mike P.; Mike E. Clark

Boondox chronology
South of Hell (2010)	Abaddon (2014)	The Murder (2017)

Abaddon is the fourth studio album by the American rapper Boondox, released on May 13, 2014, by Psychopathic Records.

== Reception ==
Professional ratings
Review scores
Source	Rating
AllMusic	4/5 stars

AllMusic's David Jeffries wrote, "The album is willfully full of this disgusting and terrible stuff, but with that Psychopathic carnival sound meeting Boondox's grim hick-hop with both running at full steam, Abaddon thrills the derelict and excites the inner-fiend from its boozy beginnings to its ghastly end."

== Track listing ==
No.	Title	Writer(s)	Producer(s)	Length
1.	"Intro" (performed by SickTanic)	SickTanic; Brian Bukantis	Kuma	1:48
2.	"Abaddon"	David Hutto; Bukantis	Kuma; Mike E. Clark (add.)	3:27
3.	"The Sober Truth"	Hutto; Bukantis	Kuma	3:49
4.	"Bloody Regrets" (featuring Big Hoodoo)	Hutto; Damone Booth; Michael J. Puwal	Mike P	4:37
5.	"Dope Boy"	Hutto; Puwal	Mike P	4:11
6.	"Kikdoe" (featuring Violent J)	Hutto; Joseph Bruce; Puwal	Mike P	3:35
7.	"Pillin' Spree"	Hutto; Bukantis	Kuma	2:32
8.	"Betrayal" (featuring Crucifix)	Hutto; Cameron Cruce; Puwal	Mike P	4:30
9.	"Prophet"	Hutto; Bukantis	Kuma	4:08
10.	"Monster"	Hutto; Bukantis	Kuma	3:42
11.	"My Night" (featuring Insane Clown Posse)	Hutto; Bruce; Joseph Utsler; Puwal	Mike P	3:47
12.	"Black Eyed Kids"	Hutto; Bukantis	Kuma	3:38
13.	"Movin' On" (featuring JellyRoll and Demi Demaree)	Hutto; Jason Deford; Demi Demaree; Puwal	Mike P	4:44
14.	"Kill N' Tell"	Hutto; Bukantis	Kuma	3:55
15.	"Psycho Symphony" (featuring Syn)	Hutto; Syn; Puwal	Mike P	4:15
Total length:				56:38

Sample credits

- Track 10 contains samples from "Monster" by Meg & Dia

== Personnel ==
- David "Boondox" Hutto – vocals (tracks: 2–15)
- Sicktanik – vocals (track 1)
- Damone "Big Hoodoo" Booth – vocals (track 4)
- Joseph "Violent J" Bruce – vocals (tracks: 6, 11), additional vocals (track 2)
- Cameron "Crucifix" Cruce – vocals (track 8)
- Joseph "Shaggy 2 Dope" Utsler – vocals (track 11)
- Jason "Jelly Roll" DeFord – vocals (track 13)
- Demi Demaree – vocals (track 13)
- Syn – vocals (track 15)
- Courtney Desmett – additional vocals (track 3)
- Ash "Lil Pig" – additional vocals (tracks: 3, 4, 8, 9, 11)
- Michael "DJ Clay" Velasquez – additional vocals (track 7)
- Brian Kuma – additional vocals (track 8), producer (tracks: 1–3, 7, 9, 10, 12, 14), mixing (track 1), engineering, recording
- The Kids – additional vocals (track 12)
- Leah Stalker – additional vocals (track 12)
- Wolfpac – additional vocals (track 14)
- Michael "Mike P." Puwal – producer (tracks: 4–6, 8, 11, 13, 15)
- Michael Earl Clark – additional producer (track 2), mixing (tracks: 2–15)
- Jim Kissling – mastering
- Brandon "Bowski" Calhoun – artwork, layout
- Paul Carnegie – artwork

== Charts ==
Chart (2014)	Peak position
US Billboard 200	147
US Independent Albums (Billboard)	29
US Top Rap Albums (Billboard)	13
