= South of Hell (album) =

Studio album by Boondox
- Released: May 11, 2010
- Recorded: 2009–2010
- Studio: Funhouse Studio (Sterlings Height, MI)
- Length: 53:33
- Label: Psychopathic
- Producer: Mike E. Clark

Boondox chronology
Krimson Creek (2008)	South of Hell (2010)	Abaddon (2014)

South of Hell is the third studio album by the American rapper Boondox, released on May 11, 2010, by Psychopathic Records.

== Music and lyrics ==
AllMusic's David Jeffries wrote, "Combining Kid Rock’s country-ish side with the horror show hip-hop of the Insane Clown Posse, Boondox’s third effort is swampy and creepy with doom, gloom, and murder on the brain, unless it jarringly decides it is party time." The album's lyrics touch on "love gone bad, family issues, and internal struggles with vice". The music combines elements of country with hip-hop beats and funk-derived grooves, and includes live instrumentation, including slide guitar and banjos. "We All Fall" features the use of Auto-Tune.

== Reception ==
Professional ratings
Review scores
Source	Rating
AllMusic	3/5 stars

AllMusic's David Jeffries wrote, "Good news is, the lighter cuts are nearly as strong as the dark numbers, and the distance between the two won’t seem so vast to Psychopathic fans who have cut their teeth on ICP and Twiztid." Kik Axe Music's James Zahn gave the album 3.5 out of 5, writing that "Boondox is at his best when keeping the south flowing throughout." Zahn describes "We All Fall" as the album's weakest track.

== Track listing ==
All lyrics are written by David Hutto; all music is composed by Mike E. Clark.

No.	Title	Length
1.	"Intro"	1:22
2.	"Cold Day in Hell"	3:57
3.	"Color You Dead"	2:57
4.	"Red Dirt Road"	3:16
5.	"Some Kind of Devil"	3:37
6.	"Love of My Knife"	4:37
7.	"We All Fall"	4:10
8.	"Toast to the Fam"	3:10
9.	"In Between"	3:47
10.	"Family Tree"	3:50
11.	"Lezbehonest"	3:36
12.	"Just Die"	3:51
13.	"Nothing to Lose"	4:20
14.	"Watch Your Back" (featuring Insane Clown Posse)	3:15
15.	"Where Do I Go?"	3:48
Total length:		53:33

Bonus material (DVD)
No.	Title	Length
16.	"Southern Bled" (Documentary)

== Personnel ==
- David "Boondox" Hutto – lyrics, lead and backing vocals
- Joseph "Violent J" Bruce – vocals (track 14)
- Joseph "Shaggy 2 Dope" Utsler – vocals (track 14)
- Mike E. Clark – backing vocals, composer, producer, programming, recording, mixing
- Jake "Cleetus" Polzin – backing vocals
- Amanda Palmer – backing vocals
- Jim Kissling – mastering
- Paul Andreason – director

== Charts ==
Chart (2010)	Peak position
US Billboard 200	54
US Top Rap Albums (Billboard)	6
US Independent Albums (Billboard)	9
US Tastemakers (Billboard)	13
US Top Album Sales (Billboard)	54
