= Cryptic Collection Vol. 3 =

Cryptic Collection 3

Compilation album by Twiztid
- Released: May 18, 2004
- Genre: Horrorcore
- Length: 56:12
- Label: Psychopathic Records
- Producer: Fritz "The Cat"; Amare Yaodaming

Twiztid chronology
Cryptic Collection 2 (2001)	Cryptic Collection 3 (2004)	Cryptic Collection: Halloween Edition (2006)

Professional ratings
Review scores
Source	Rating
AllMusic	2.5/5 stars

Cryptic Collection 3 (abbreviated as CC3) is the third compilation album of Cryptic Collection series by American hip hop duo Twiztid. It was released on May 18, 2004 through Psychopathic Records and consists of nine previously unreleased tracks and five remixes, including a "surprisingly faithful" cover of the Steve Miller Band's "The Joker". AllMusic's reviewer Johnny Loftus wrote "The song is likely a coded reference to those obsessed-over joker cards. But it's nice to think of Twiztid as regular-guy Michiganders, singing karaoke at the local sports bar".

Production was handled primarily by Fritz the Cat, except a couple of tracks produced by Amare Yaodaming. The project features guest appearances of Dark Lotus members. The album peaked at #85 on the Billboard 200 and at #2 on the Independent Albums in the United States.

== Track listing ==
All music is composed by Fritz Vankosky, except tracks 1 and 7 composed by Amare Yaodaming.

No.	Title	Writer(s)	Length
1.	"Trash Witro"	J. Spaniolo; P. Methric	1:30
2.	"Static" (featuring Drive-By)	J. Spaniolo; C. Rouleau; J. Lowery	3:54
3.	"4 Those of You (Remix)" (featuring Blaze Ya Dead Homie)	J. Spaniolo; P. Methric; C. Rouleau	4:18
4.	"Keep It Movin" (featuring Insane Clown Posse)	J. Spaniolo; P. Methric; J. Bruce; J. Utsler	3:50
5.	"2nd Hand Smoke (Remix)"	J. Spaniolo; P. Methric	3:57
6.	"Listen" (featuring Anybody Killa)	J. Spaniolo; P. Methric; J. Lowery	3:52
7.	"She Said (Remix)" (featuring Shaggy 2 Dope)	J. Spaniolo; P. Methric; J. Utsler	3:05
8.	"Shock & Awe" (featuring Dark Lotus)	J. Spaniolo; P. Methric; J. Bruce; J. Utsler; C. Rouleau; J. Lowery	3:34
9.	"Joker"	S. Miller	3:11
10.	"Lil' Secret" (featuring Colton Grundy and Violent J)	J. Spaniolo; P. Methric; J. Bruce; C. Rouleau	2:33
11.	"Fucmyself"	J. Spaniolo; P. Methric	4:02
12.	"Know Good"	J. Spaniolo; P. Methric	3:23
13.	"Wrong Wit Me (Remix)"	J. Spaniolo	3:25
Total length:			56:12

Notes

- Track 1 was an alternate version of the song "White Trash Wit Tat-2s" from Twiztid's album The Green Book (2003)
- Tracks 2, 4, 6, 9, 10, and 11 were either outtakes from The Green Book or were made specifically for the compilation (2003/2004)
- Track 3 was a remix of the song of the same name on Twiztid's album Mirror Mirror (2002)
- Track 5 was a remix of the song of the same name on Twiztid's album Mostasteless (1997)
- Track 7 was a remix of the song "I'm the Only 1" on The Green Book (2003)
- Track 8 was an outtake from Dark Lotus' album Black Rain (2004)
- Track 12 was an outtake from Twiztid's album Freek Show (2000)
- Track 13 was a remix of the song of the same name that was released as a limited edition single when Twiztid had briefly left Psychopathic Records (2002)

== Charts ==
Chart (2004)	Peak position
US Billboard 200	85
US Independent Albums (Billboard)	2
