= The Harvest (Boondox album) =

Studio album by Boondox
- Released: July 11, 2006
- Recorded: 2005–2006
- Length: 45:54
- Label: Psychopathic
- Producers: Mike E. Clark; Brian Kuma; Dr. Punch; Fritz The Cat; Tino Grosse

Boondox chronology
The Harvest (2006)	PunkinHed (2007)

The Harvest is the debut studio album by the American rapper Boondox, released on July 11, 2006, by Psychopathic Records.

== Track listing ==
No.	Title	Length
1.	"Intro"	1:16
2.	"Seven"	3:30
3.	"Out Here"	3:18
4.	"It Ain't a Thang"	3:45
5.	"Digging"	3:04
6.	"Lady in the Jaguar"	3:55
7.	"They Pray with Snakes"	3:56
8.	"Rollin Hard"	4:07
9.	"The Harvest"	3:53
10.	"Sippin"	3:16
11.	"Lake of Fire"	4:12
12.	"Red Mist"	3:54
13.	"Angel Like"	3:42
Total length:		45:54

== Personnel ==
Vocals, Lyrics

- Boondox
- Insane Clown Posse - (5)
- Axe Murder Boyz - (9)
- Twiztid - (12)
- Blaze Ya Dead Homie - (12)

Additional Vocals

- Carlito Hill - (2)
- Savannah Hill - (2)
- Violent J - (3, 8, 10)
- The Rude Boy - (4)
- Jenny - (6)
- Mike E. Clark - (10)
- Otis - (13)

Production

- Boondox - (2, 3, 4, 5, 6, 7, 8, 9, 10, 11, 12, 13)
- Dr. Punch - (2, 3, 4, 5, 7, 8, 10, 11, 12, 13)
- Insane Clown Posse - (6)
- Axe Murder Boyz - (9)
- Twiztid - (12)
- Blaze Ya Dead Homie - (12)
- Mike E. Clark - Music Written, programmed, played - (2, 3, 4, 6, 8, 10, 11, 12, 13)
- Tino Grosse - Music written, programmed, played - (3)
- Kuma - Music written, programmed, played - (5, 7, 9)

Other Production (Engineering)

- Fritz "The Cat" Van Kosky - (2, 3, 4, 6, 8, 10, 11, 12, 13)
- Kuma - (2, 3, 4, 5, 6, 7, 8, 9, 10, 11, 13)
- Dr. Punch - (2, 3, 4, 5, 6, 7, 8, 9, 11, 12, 13)
- Mike E. Clark - (10)
- Eric Davie - (10)

Other Production (Mixed)

- Fritz "The Cat" Van Kosky - (2, 3, 4, 5, 6, 7, 8, 9, 10, 11, 12, 13)
- Kuma - (2, 3, 4, 5, 6, 7, 8, 9, 10, 11, 12, 13)
- Dr. Punch - (2, 3, 4, 5, 6, 7, 8, 9, 10, 11, 12, 13)
