= Kung Fu Vampire =

American rapper

- Origin: San Jose, California
- Genres: Hip hop
- Occupation: Rapper
- Years active: 2001—present
- Labels: Ultra Violet
- Website: www.KungFuVampire.com

Kung Fu Vampire is an American rapper from San Jose, California. Since 2001, he has been recognized as a "goth rapper", and for being accompanied by a band in his live hip hop performances. He released his debut album, Blood Bath Beyond in 2003.

== History ==
Kung Fu Vampire began breakdancing at the age of six, and taught himself how to rap and sing while playing drums and bass as a hobby. At the age of 12, his aunt began taking him to see concert performances, and introduced him to a gothic style of dress. At 14 years old he and three friends formed a group which fused old school hip hop with funk and electronica. In 2001, he adopted the name "Kung Fu Vampire" during a conversation with his friends in which they discussed the idea of a martial arts film featuring vampires. He describes the sense of balance as the "Yin and Yang of Fang".

In 2006, the group was voted the best local band by Metro Silicon Valley readers. Director Darren Lynn Bousman was impressed by Kung Fu Vampire's performance style, and pushed for the rapper to perform at the release party for Saw III that year, performing at the release party for Bousman's film Repo! The Genetic Opera in 2008, and the rapper's song "Dead Girls Don't Say No" being featured in another Bousman film, Mother's Day, in 2010. In 2009, the Insane Clown Posse fan website Faygoluvers featured Kung Fu Vampire's music video "iCount" on the site, attracting the attention of Twiztid, who invited Kung Fu Vampire to perform as the duo's opening act during their 2010 "Slaughterhouse" tour. In 2012, Kung Fu Vampire appeared in the music video for E-40's song "Zombie" featuring Brotha Lynch Hung and Tech N9ne. In 2016, Kung Fu Vampire released Look Alive, featuring guest appearances by Brotha Lynch Hung, ¡Mayday!, Locksmith and Ces Cru. In 2019, Kung Fu Vampire performed on the "Shazam Stage" at Insane Clown Posse's Gathering of the Juggalos.

== Style and influences ==
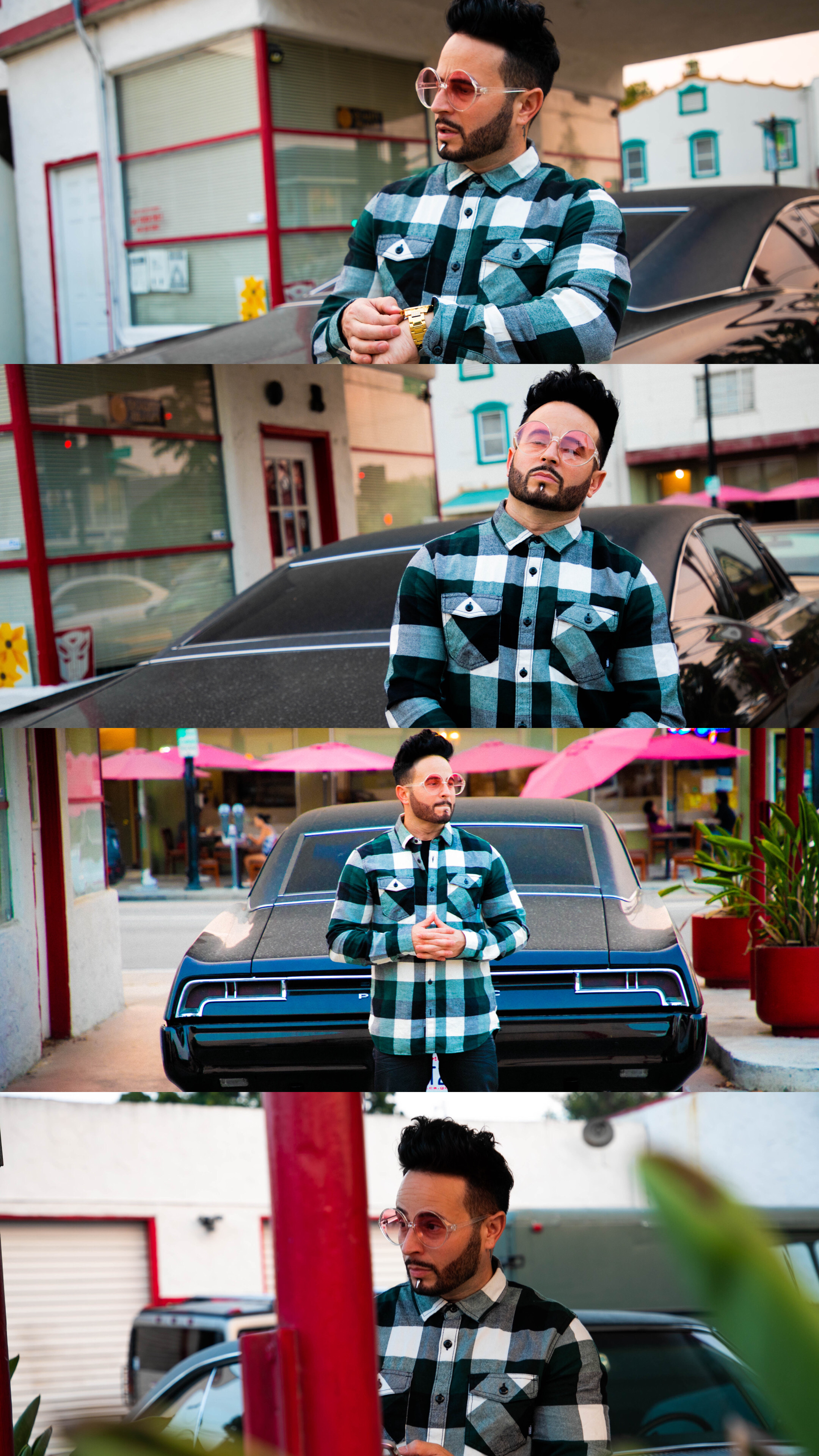

Kung Fu Vampire's musical style fuses hip hop, gothic rock, funk and electro. His influences are Danny Elfman, Nine Inch Nails, Talking Heads, the Doors, Whodini, Eric B. & Rakim and N.W.A. He rejected the classification of horrorcore, preferring to call his music "gothic hip hop". He generally avoids rapping about graphic violence, and makes little or no reference to campy horror films or smoking cannabis. His lyrics have spoken out against drug use, in particular meth and alcohol, and advocated for healthy living. He was initially known for making appearances with a shaved head and pale face paint. In 2011, he grew his hair out and has stopped using face paint in his performances stating that he would rather spend that time connecting with fans at concert as opposed to preparation.

== Live band members ==
Current

- Kung Fu Vampire — vocals
- Jeremy Pollett — bass
- Chris Paxton — drums

== Production team ==
Current & Past

- ProHoezak

• TunnA Beatz

- Skytzo Beatz

• Subliminal Beats

- Action Paxton

• Nobe of Inf Gang

- GodSynth

• MOK Beatz

- Cruels

• Jawsh Crespo

- Jazz Mafia

• K-Oddic Beats

- Duranamo

• Michael “Seven” Summers

- Charlie Beans

• Starkore

- MOK Beatz

• The Butler

== Discography ==
=== Studio albums ===
Title	Album details
Blood Bath Beyond	Released: October 13, 2003; Label: Kung Fu Vampire Publishing, Journees Music
Dead Sexy	Released: October 31, 2008; Label: Kung Fu Vampire Publishing, Mad Insanity Records
Love Bites	Released: October 31, 2012; Label: Kung Fu Vampire Publishing, Mad Insanity Records
Look Alive	Released: July 8, 2016; Label: Kung Fu Vampire Publishing
Come Dawn	Released: August 30, 2019; Label: Ultra Violet Entertainment
Black Heart Machine	Released: Apr 23, 2023; Label: Ultra Violet Entertainment

=== Compilations ===
Year	Album
Womb Til Tomb	Released: April 20, 2002; Label: Shotcallers Recordings, Journees Music, Kung Fu Vampire Publishing
Re-Animated	Released: September 9, 2014; Label: Kung Fu Vampire Publishing

=== Collaboration albums ===
Year	Album
Double Dragon with Bukshot	Released: 2020; Label: Kung Fu Vampire Publishing

=== Singles ===
Year	Single	Album
2013	"Turnt Up" featuring Hopsin	Re-Animated
2016	"Little Girl Big Mouth" featuring Lex The Hex Master	Look Alive
2018	"Neighborhood"	Come Dawn
2019	"Trapped In Hell" featuring Futuristic	Come Dawn
2020	"Don't Get Beat Up" w/ Bukshot	Double Dragon
2021	"These Days" w/ Action Paxton	Black Heart Machine
2021	"5AM" w/ Action Paxton	Black Heart Machine

=== Features ===
- Twisted Insane track "Voices" featuring Bleezo, Kung Fu Vampire, Bishop, and Poverty's Posterboy from the album The Insane Asylum (2013)
- Twiztid track "Wasted Part 2" featuring Kung Fu Vampire, Chris Webby, RA The Rugged Man and Three Six Mafia from the album Get Twiztid (2014)
- Bloodstepp track "Rave In My Grave" featuring Koshir and Kung Fu Vampire from the album Grand Theft Ufo: Floppy Disk Edition (2014)
- Scum track "It Is Not" feat. Kung Fu Vampire from the Album One Track Mind (2016)
- Blaze Ya Dead Homie track "Ghost" featuring Kung Fu Vampire from the album Casket Factory (2016)
- Whitney Peyton track "Word Of Mouth" featuring Kung Fu Vampire from the album Break The Frame (2016)
- Gorilla Voltage track "Rocks For Brains" featuring Kung Fu Vampire from the album Ape-X (2017)
- Gorilla Voltage track "Lit" featuring Kung Fu Vampire from the album Ape-X (2017)
- When They Hear It (The R.O.C. ft. Kung Fu Vampire & Prozak) on the album Digital Voodoo (2017)
