= Lex The Hex Master =

American rapper from Queens, New York

- Born: May 14, 1986 (age 40) Philadelphia, Pennsylvania
- Origin: Queens, New York
- Genres: Hip hop, Horror core
- Occupation: Rapper
- Years active: 2009-present
- Label: Majik Ninja (2015–2024) LSP (2024–present)
- Website: lexthehexmaster.com

Lex The Hex Master (born May 14, 1986) is an American rapper from Queens, New York. He signed to Twiztid's label Majik Ninja Entertainment in mid 2015 and left sometime in early 2024. In April 2024 it was announced he signed to Scum's label Lyrikal Snuff Productions.

== Background ==
First influenced by Nas, 2Pac and DMX, he later turned to Insane Clown Posse, Twiztid and Blaze Ya Dead Homie.

== Signing to Majik Ninja Entertainment (2015 – present) ==
After uploading songs to YouTube and catching the attention of Twiztid he was signed to the label in mid 2015 with it being announced via social media and a music video titled "Bomb On Em". Lex "The Hex" Master did his first set as a Majik Ninja Entertainment artist at Twiztid's "New Year's Evil 8".

== The Black Season EP ==
His first album on the label during Blaze Ya Dead Homie's "The Casket Factory Tour", titled The Black Season EP. The album reached No. 10 on the Billboard Top Heatseekers album chart, No. 49 on the Independent Albums chart and No. 40 on the Top R&B/Hip-Hop Albums chart, all on the chart week for April 30, 2016.

== Mr. Ugly ==
In March 2016, Lex appeared on Kung Fu Vampire's single "Little Girl Big Mouth" which was his first ever guest appearance outside of MNE since signing. July 10, 2016 it was announced that his mixtape Mr. Ugly at the Gathering of the Juggalos 2016.

== Contact Era (2016–2017) ==
On August 8, 2016 it was announced via Facebook that he would release his first full-length album, Contact, on November 11, 2016. The first single from the album is titled I Don't Like Your Face featuring Jamie Madrox and was accompanied by a music video. The second single titled "The Boss, The Teacher & The Preacher" was released on October 31, 2016. The third single titled "My House" featuring Chris Rivers and Billy Danze was released on November 11, 2016. The third single titled "Army Of One" was released on November 21, 2016.

On January 1, 2017 Lex "The Hex" Master was invited to participate in the Juggalo March On Washington. On Majik Ninja Entertainment's Facebook account it was announced that no artist from the label would take part in the March, but would participate in the 2017 Juggalo Day Show: Tales From The Lotus Pod. Lex will join the Eat Your Heart Out Tour (Twiztid, Blaze Ya Dead Homie, Boondox, Lex "The Hex" Master, G-Mo Skee, The R.O.C.) leading up to Juggalo Day Show 2017: Tales From The Lotus Pod. In a January 19, 2017 Insane Clown Posse interview with Faygoluvers.net, it was announced that all Majik Ninja Entertainment artists have been removed from the lineup and will be replaced.

Since late 2016 Lex has been posting on social media of him working on new music in the studio.

== Beyond Redemption Era: (2017) ==
In early January 2017, Lex posted a video snippet of his upcoming album. In mid January 2017, Majik Ninja Entertainment announced its upcoming album releases for the year and it was announced that Lex's 2nd studio album will be titled Beyond Redemption, with no release date given. On March 7, 2017 it was announced that Lex is also working on Mr. Ugly 2.

== Discography ==
Studio albums

- Born in Hell (2015) (Independent)
- Contact (November 11, 2016) (Majik Ninja Entertainment)
- Beyond Redemption (October 31, 2017) (Majik Ninja Entertainment)

Extended plays

- The Black Season (The Casket Factory Tour 2016) (Majik Ninja Entertainment)
- Lex the Hex Master and the Unholy Trinity (Spooktacular Horror Show Tour 2016) (Majik Ninja Entertainment)

Mixtapes

- Mr. Ugly (GOTJ 2016) (Majik Ninja Entertainment)
- Mr. Ugly 2 (May 17, 2017) (Majik Ninja Entertainment)
- Shadow King (August 24, 2018) (Majik Ninja Entertainment)
- Strictly 4 My N.I.N.J.A.S. (2019) (Majik Ninja Entertainment)
