= Prozak (rapper) =

American rapper

- Born: Steven T. Shippy; August 25, 1977 (age 48); Saginaw, Michigan, U.S.
- Genres: Hip-hop; horrorcore
- Occupations: Rapper; songwriter; director
- Years active: 1999–present
- Label: Strange Music
- Website: www.strangemusicinc.com/artists/prozak

Steven T. Shippy, better known by his stage name Prozak, (born August 25, 1977) is an American independent rapper and film director. He is a member of the group Project:Deadman with Mike E. Clark as well as the group Bedlam with Madness and Staplez. He is one of few rappers of Assyrian descent. In 2011, he officially signed with Strange Music, although he had previously released albums with the label.

== Discography ==
=== Studio albums ===
List of studio albums, with selected chart positions
| Title | Album details | Peak chart positions | | | |
| Title | Album details | US | US Ind | US R&B | US Rap |
|---|---|---|---|---|---|
| Tales from the Sick | Released: June 3, 2008; Label: Strange Music; Format: CD, digital download | — | 25 | 50 | 20 |
| Paranormal | Released: April 24, 2012; Label: Strange Music; Format: CD, digital download | 90 | 15 | 13 | 8 |
| We All Fall Down | Released: September 17, 2013; Label: Strange Music; Format: CD, digital download | 122 | 23 | 20 | 11 |
| Black Ink | Released: October 9, 2015; Label: Strange Music; Format: CD, digital download | 97 | 24 | 18 | 13 |

=== Collaborative albums ===
| Title | Album details |
|---|---|
| Chemical Imbalancez Vol. 1 (with Bedlam) | Released: 1999; Label: Mentality; Format: CD, digital download |
| Chemical Imbalancez Vol. 2 (with Bedlam) | Released: 2001; Label: Ghetto; Format: CD, digital download |
| Shock Treatment (with Bedlam) | Released: 2002; Label: Redrum; Format: CD, digital download |
| Self Inflicted (with Project: Deadman) | Released: 2004; Label: Strange Music; Format: CD, digital download |
| Bedlamitez Rize (with Bedlam) | Released: 2004; Label: Long Range; Format: CD, digital download |
| 9 (with Bedlam) | Released: 2015; Label: Self-released; Format: CD, digital download |

=== Extended plays ===
| Title | EP details |
|---|---|
| Aftabirth | Released: 2000; Label: Self-released; Format: CD, digital download |
| Nocturnal | Released: December 11, 2012; Label: Strange Music; Format: CD, digital download |

=== Guest appearances ===
| Title | Year | Artist(s) | Album |
|---|---|---|---|
| "Trapped" | 2006 | Prozak and Mike E. Clark as Project: Deadman | Everready (The Religion) |
| "Holy War" | 2006 | Prozak and Mike E. Clark as Project: Deadman | Everready (The Religion) |
| "You Don't Want It" | 2007 | Tech N9ne (feat. Krizz Kaliko, Mr. Reece and Prozak) | Misery Loves Kompany |
| "Peek-A-Boo" | 2008 | Krizz Kaliko (feat. Prozak and Twiztid) | Vitiligo |
| "Horns" | 2009 | Tech N9ne (feat. King Gordy and Prozak) | K.O.D. |
| "My Favorite" | 2011 | Tech N9ne (feat. Brotha Lynch Hung, Prozak and Krizz Kaliko) | Welcome to Strangeland |
| "Dream of a King" | 2012 | Krizz Kaliko (feat. Prozak, Bernz and Wrekonize) | Kickin' and Screamin' |
| "Strangeulation IV" | 2014 | Tech N9ne (feat. Prozak, Big Scoob, Krizz Kaliko and Rittz) | Strangeulation |
| "Tell Me If I'm Trippin'" | 2015 | Tech N9ne (feat. Brotha Lynch Hung, Prozak and Tyler Lyon) | Strangeulation Vol. II |
| "Strangeulation Vol. II Cypher IV" | 2015 | Tech N9ne (feat. Krizz Kaliko, Rittz and Prozak) | Strangeulation Vol. II |
| "Jesus and a Pill" | 2017 | Tech N9ne (feat. Prozak and Krizz Kaliko) | Dominion |
| "These Hands" | 2017 | Tech N9ne (feat. Prozak, Wrekonize and Mackenzie Nicole) | Strange Reign |

== Filmography ==
Released a VHS with his group Bedlam entitled HellRidez

He has also directed music videos, notably Tech N9ne's Bout ta Bubble, as well as several of his own videos.

Shippy and his paranormal crew filmed a movie called SEEKERS: A Haunting on Hamilton Street, which is based in Saginaw, MI, where Shippy, Brian Harnois, Father Calder, and his crew go into reportedly haunted places and try to find evidence of the paranormal by video and EVP (Electronic Voice Phenomenon). The DVD was released Friday, October 29, 2010.

Vol. 2 - A Haunting on Hamilton Street 2 premiered at the Temple Theater in Saginaw, MI on October 28 and 29, 2011.

Vol. 3 - A Haunting on Potter Street was released in 2012.

Vol. 4 - A Haunting in Saginaw, Michigan was released in 2013

Vol. 5 - A Haunting on Washington Avenue: The Temple Theatre was released in 2014

Vol. 6 - A Haunting at the Hoyt Library was released in 2015

Vol. 7 - A Haunting on Dice Road: The Hell House was released in 2016

Vol. 8 - A Haunting on Dice Road 2: Town of the Dead was released November 3, 2017

Vol. 9 - A Haunting on Finn Road: The Devil's Grove was released on October 26, 2018

Vol. 10 - A Haunting on Brockway Street was released on November 15, 2019

== See also ==
- Strange Music
