= Boondox =

American rapper

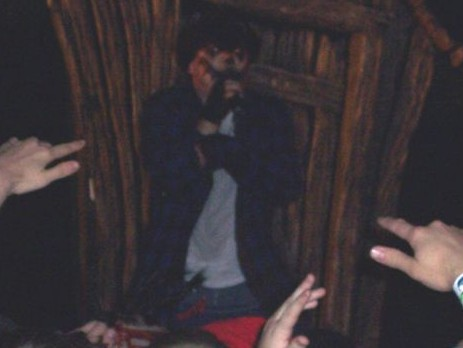
- Boondox performing in Topeka, KS on December 6, 2014

Background information
- Also known as: Turncoat Dirty
- Born: David Haskell Hutto; September 4, 1975 (age 51); Richmond County, Georgia, United States
- Origin: Covington, Georgia, United States
- Genres: Hip-hop
- Occupation: Rapper
- Instrument: Bass guitar
- Years active: 2006–present
- Labels: Majik Ninja; Psychopathic
- Member of: Underground Avengers
- Formerly of: Southern Hustlas, Inc.; Psychopathic Rydas

Boondox (born David Haskell Hutto; September 4, 1975) is an American rapper from Covington, Georgia. Known for his killer scarecrow stage persona and horror-themed country-influenced rap style, he gained prominence after signing with Psychopathic Records, where he released his debut album, The Harvest, in 2006. He later signed with Majik Ninja Entertainment.

== Biography ==
Hutto was born in Richmond County, Georgia, but grew up in Covington, Georgia. Hutto grew up in a negative family environment as a child, he was not popular at his school, frequently got into fights, and experimented with drug use. He played bass guitar in several local rock bands before starting his rap career as part of a local group, Southern Hustlas, Inc.

Hutto caught the attention of Insane Clown Posse while selling his cassettes at one of their concerts. Following several phone calls with Violent J, Hutto signed to Psychopathic Records, becoming the first Southern rapper to join the label. His debut album, The Harvest, produced by Mike E. Clark, was released in 2006, and promoted in the summer of that year on Blaze Ya Dead Homie's Tombstone Terror Tour, which Hutto was a featured performer on. On May 1, 2007, Hutto released the extended play PunkinHed. During the same year, he joined the gangsta rap supergroup Psychopathic Rydas, where he performed under the alias Yung Dirt.

On May 13, 2008, Hutto released his second studio album, Krimson Creek, a more personal work drawing from his past. It peaked at No. 113 on the Billboard 200. South of Hell was released in 2010, accompanied by a documentary entitled Southern Bled; the album was his highest-charting album to date, peaking at 54 on the Billboard album chart. Following this album, Hutto temporarily moved away from the Boondox branding, leaving Psychopathic Records, recording gangsta rap under the name Turncoat Dirty and forming a supergroup called the Underground Avengers, before returning to Psychopathic as Boondox in 2014 to release Abaddon, which featured guest appearances by Big Hoodoo, ICP and Jelly Roll. The following year, Hutto left Psychopathic for Twiztid's Majik Ninja label. His first album for the label, The Murder, was released in 2017.

== Style ==
Hutto's stage persona is a killer scarecrow. He dresses in hillbilly clothing, including a cowboy hat, flannel shirt, and country boots; this appearance, along with the rural instrumentation of Hutto's music, has been noted as a divergence from the more urban style of his rap scene. However, as Anthony Tognazzini wrote, "Despite his unique getup, Boondox falls in line with labelmates Insane Clown Posse and Twiztid in his penchant for horror movie imagery and eerie atmospherics". Hearth Music, writing for the American folk music magazine No Depression, said that Hutto's music video for "They Pray With Snakes", which features black and white clips from documentary films on Southern snake handler religions, "assures his place in the hillbilly hip-hop hall of fame."

Hutto's music has been described as "Combining Kid Rock’s country-ish side with the horror show hip-hop of the Insane Clown Posse". It is an amalgamation of the "Southern twang of banjos and harmonicas" with hip-hop, incorporating live instrumentation, including slide guitar.

His lyrics center around Southern culture, doom, gloom, and murder, as well as partying. Hutto is also known for his confessional lyrics dealing with his childhood; one of Hutto's songs described an incident in which his uncle tried to kill him by drowning him in a swimming pool, and other lyrics have dealt with his getting into fights at his school and experiments with drugs.

Steve "Flash" Juon noted that "Southern Nights" illustrated that Hutto was "a strange fit" for Psychopathic, as Hutto's "drunk in the Waffle House" lyrics had more in common with Bubba Sparxxx than any of his labelmates, while songs like "Suffering" see Hutto "[attempting] to get as dark and gothic" as his labelmates, "and [he is] convincing enough to pass". AllMusic's David Jeffries said that Hutto's rapping and lyricism "often sounds more Vinnie Paz or Sick Jacken than the rest of the Psychopathic crew". Jeffries described the song "Family Tree" as an example of Hutto as "a strong and even serious lyricist".

== Discography ==
- The Harvest (2006)
- Krimson Creek (2008)
- South of Hell (2010)
- Abaddon (2014)
- The Murder (2017)
- Krimson Crow (2020)
