= Shaggy 2 Dope discography =

- Studio albums: 2
- Extended plays: 2
- Video albums: 1
- Music videos: 2

The discography of Joseph Utsler, an American rapper better known by his hip hop persona of the wicked clown Shaggy 2 Dope, consists of two studio albums and two extended plays. Collaborations are also included, as are film and television appearances and home video releases. In addition to his solo career, Utsler has also been involved with eight hip hop groups; JJ Boys, Inner City Posse, Insane Clown Posse, Golden Goldies, Dark Lotus, Psychopathic Rydas, Soopa Villainz and The Killjoy Club.

He has gained success predominantly as a member of the duo Insane Clown Posse, where he has earned three gold albums and two platinum albums. Along with member Joseph "Violent J" Bruce, Utsler founded the independent record label Psychopathic Records with Alex Abbiss as manager in 1991. He has also produced and starred in the feature films Big Money Hustlas and Big Money Rustlas.

== Solo albums ==
=== Studio albums ===
List of studio albums, with selected chart positions
Title	Album details	Peak chart positions							
Title	Album details	US	US Current	US Rock	US R&B/HH	US Sales	US Indie	US Taste	US Artist
F.T.F.O.	Released: February 21, 2006; Label: Psychopathic Records	88	88	24	—	88	7	11	—
F.T.F.O.M.F.	Released: May 26, 2017; Label: Psychopathic Records	72	16	—	39	18	1	—	96
"—" denotes releases that did not chart, or was not released in that country.

=== Extended plays ===
List of extended plays, with selected chart positions
Title	Album details	Peak chart positions
Title	Album details	US Indie
Fuck Off!	Released: November 22, 1994; Label: Psychopathic	42
Gloomy Sunday	Released: January 10, 2019; Label: Psychopathic	—
Professor Shaggs And The Quest For The Ultimate Groove	Released: May 26, 2023; Label: Psychopathic	—
"—" denotes releases that did not chart, or was not released in that country.		

== Music videos ==
Year	Title	Director(s)	Album	Featured artist
2017	"Tell These Bitches"		F.T.F.O.M.F.	
2018	"The Knife"		F.T.F.O.M.F.	

== Group albums ==
=== w/Inner City Posse ===
Year	Album details
1990	Ghetto Territory: Released: 1990; Format: CS
1991	Bass-ment Cuts: Released: 1991; Label: Rude Time Records/Psychopathic Records; Format: CD, CS
1991	Dog Beats: Released: 1991; Label: Psychopathic Records; Format: CD, CS

*Performed as 2 Dope

=== w/Golden Goldies ===
Year	Album details
1995	Gimme Them Fuckin' Nuggets Bitch, Or I'll Punch Your Fuckin' Face: Released: 1995; Label: Psychopathic Records; Format: CD, CS

*Performed as Gold D

=== w/Psychopathic Rydas ===
*Performed as Full Clip

=== w/Soopa Villainz ===
*Performed as Mr. Club

== Guest appearances ==
=== Solo ===
Year	Song	Artist	Album	Label	Performed As
2001	She Ain't Afraid	Twiztid	Cryptic Collection Vol. 2		
2003	Now You Know	Anybody Killa	Hatchet Warrior	Psychopathic Records	
2003	I'm The Only 1	Twiztid	The Green Book	Psychopathic Records	
2003	The Wizards Palace	Violent J	Wizard of the Hood EP	Psychopathic Records	
2004	Nevahoe	Anybody Killa	Dirty History	Psychopathic Records	
2005	Entity	Twiztid	Man's Myth (Vol. 1)	Psychopathic Records	
2008	Hello	The R.O.C.	Welcome to the Dark Side EP	Hatchet House	
2009	Home Invasion	Violent J	The Shining	Psychopathic Records	
2010	We Got It	Chop Shop	Welcome to the Chop Shop	Hatchet House	
2017	She Ain't Afraid	Twiztid	Cryptic Collection: Valentine's Day Edition	Majik Ninja Entertainment	
2017	After School Special	Fisty Cuffs			
2018	Da Way We Live	Myzery	20th Anniversary: Para la Isla	Psychopathic Records/Poor Manz Entertainment	
2018	Black Eye Kids	Violent J	Brother EP	Psychopathic Records	

=== w/Violent J (Insane Clown Posse) ===
Year	Song	Artist	Album	Label	Performed As
1995	Graveyard	Project Born	Born Dead EP	Psychopathic Records	
1996	Cykosis	Coup Detroit			
1997	85 Bucks And Hour	Twiztid	Mostasteless	Psychopathic Records	
1997	Spin The Bottle	Twiztid	Mostasteless	Psychopathic Records	
1997	Meat Cleaver (w/Myzery)	Twiztid	Mostasteless	Psychopathic Records	
1997	Hound Dogs (w/Blaze Ya Dead Homie)	Twiztid	Mostasteless	Psychopathic Records	
2000	Shittalkaz	Blaze Ya Dead Homie	Blaze Ya Dead Homie EP	Psychopathic Records/Gotham Zone Entertainment	
2000	All I Ever Wanted	Twiztid	Freek Show	Psychopathic Records	
2000	Wut Tha Dead Like	Twiztid	Freek Show	Psychopathic Records	
2000	Maniac Killa	Twiztid	Freek Show	Psychopathic Records	
2001	Given Half A Chance	Blaze Ya Dead Homie	1 Less G n da Hood	Psychopathic Records	
2001	Hatchet Execution	Blaze Ya Dead Homie	1 Less G n da Hood	Psychopathic Records	
2001	I Don't Care	Twiztid	Cryptic Collection Vol. 2	Psychopathic Records	
2001	Drunken Ninja Master	Twiztid	Cryptic Collection Vol. 2	Psychopathic Records	Dark Lotus
2002	Ninjas In Action (w/Twiztid & Drive-By)	Jumpsteady	The Chaos Theory EP	Psychopathic Records	
2002	Migraine Headache	Esham	Acid Rain	Psychopathic Records	
2002	P-P-P-POW!!!!	Esham	Acid Rain	Psychopathic Records	
2003	Hard Times	Esham	Repentance	Psychopathic Records	
2004	Keep It Movin	Twiztid	Cryptic Collection Vol. 3	Psychopathic Records	
2006	Calm Down	Axe Murder Boyz	Blood In, Blood Out	Psychopathic Records	
2006	Lady In The Jaguar	Boondox	The Harvest	Psychopathic Records	
2007	Monsters Ball	Twiztid	Independents Day	Psychopathic Records	
2008	Walking After Midnight	Boondox	Krimson Creek	Psychopathic Records	
2008	U Ain't No Killa	Anybody Killa	Mudface	Psychopathic Records/Native World Inc.	
2010	Watch Your Back	Boondox	South Of Hell	Psychopathic Records	
2010	Birthday	Blaze Ya Dead Homie	Gang Rags	Psychopathic Records	
2010	Keep It Wicked	Anybody Killa	Medicine Bag	Psychopathic Records/Native World Inc.	
2011	The Gathering	The Dayton Family	Charges of Indictment	Hatchet House	
2011	Gimmie More	Twiztid	Cryptic Collection Vol. 4	Psychopathic Records	
2012	Abominationz	Twiztid	Abominationz	Psychopathic Records	
2013	Spells	Big Hoodoo	Crystal Skull	Psychopathic Records	
2014	Might Go Mad	Axe Murder Boyz	The Garcia Brothers	Psychopathic Records/Canonize Productions	
2014	My Night	Boondox	Abaddon	Psychopathic Records	
2015	Fuck Off	Kottonmouth Kings	Krown Power	United Family Music	
2016	Monster Squad (w/Axe Murder Boyz, Anybody Killa & DJ Paul)	Big Hoodoo	Asylum	Psychopathic Records	
2017	FTTBBR	Lyte	Psychopathic Monstar EP	Psychopathic Records	
2018	Diamonds	Ouija Macc	Gutterwater	Psychopathic Records	

=== w/Violent J & Esham (Soopa Villainz) ===
Year	Song	Artist	Album	Label	Performed As
2003	Soopa Doopa	Esham	Repentance	Psychopathic Records	Soopa Villainz
2005	Bonus Flavor	Twiztid	Man's Myth (Vol. 1)	Psychopathic Records	Soopa Villainz

- Anybody Killa: Hatchet Warrior (2003) - "Now You Know"
- Anybody Killa: Dirty History (2004) - "Nevahoe"
- Anybody Killa: Mudface (2008) - "You aint a Killa"
- The R.O.C.: Welcome to the Dark Side (2008) - "Hello"
- Twiztid: Cryptic Collection Vol. 3 (2004) - "She Said (Remix)"
- Twiztid: The Green Book (album) (2003) - "I'm the Only 1"
- Twiztid: Man's Myth (Vol. 1) - (2005) "Entity"
- Violent J: Wizard of the Hood (2003) - "The Wizard's Palace"
- Violent J: The Shining (2009) - "Home Invasion"

== Original contributions to compilations ==
=== Solo ===
Year	Song	Artist	Album	Label	Performed As
2003	24's On A '84		Psychopathics from Outer Space 2	Joe & Joey Records	
2003	Do It!		Psychopathics from Outer Space 2	Joe & Joey Records	
2007	Last Day Alive		Psychopathics from Outer Space 3	Joe & Joey Records	
2008	Fall Apart	DJ Clay	Let 'Em Bleed: The Mixxtape, Vol. 1	Hatchet House	
2008	Knee Crakaz	DJ Clay	Let 'Em Bleed: The Mixxtape, Vol. 2	Hatchet House	
2008	Filthy	DJ Clay	Let 'Em Bleed: The Mixxtape, Vol. 2	Hatchet House	
2008	They Shootin' (Rock Mixx)	DJ Clay	Let 'Em Bleed: The Mixxtape, Vol. 3	Hatchet House	
2008	Can't Hold Me Back '08	DJ Clay	Let 'Em Bleed: The Mixxtape, Vol. 3	Hatchet House	
2008	Can't Fuck Wit Us	DJ Clay	Let 'Em Bleed: The Mixxtape, Vol. 3	Hatchet House	
2010	I Live My Life On Stage	DJ Clay	Book of the Wicked Chapter, One	Hatchet House	
2010	Down Wit Tha Wicked Shit	DJ Clay	Book of the Wicked, Chapter Two		

=== w/Violent J (Insane Clown Posse) ===
Year	Song	Artist	Album	Label	Performed As
2000	The Dirtball	Various	Psychopathics from Outer Space	Joe & Joey Records	
2000	$50 Bucks	Various	Psychopathics from Outer Space	Joe & Joey Records	
2000	Sleep Walker	Various	Psychopathics from Outer Space	Joe & Joey Records	
2000	Slim Anus	Various	Psychopathics from Outer Space	Joe & Joey Records	
2000	Dead End	Various	Psychopathics from Outer Space	Joe & Joey Records	
2000	Red Neck Hoe '99	Various	Psychopathics from Outer Space	Joe & Joey Records	
2000	The Amazing Maze	Various	Psychopathics from Outer Space	Joe & Joey Records	
2000	Meat Cleaver	Various	Psychopathics from Outer Space	Joe & Joey Records	
2003	Out There	Various	Psychopathics from Outer Space 2	Joe & Joey Records	
2003	Demon Faces	Various	Psychopathics from Outer Space 2	Joe & Joey Records	
2003	Wicked Wild	Various	Psychopathics from Outer Space 2	Joe & Joey Records	
2003	Under The Big Top	Various	Psychopathics from Outer Space 2	Joe & Joey Records	
2003	Free Studio	Various	Psychopathics from Outer Space 2	Joe & Joey Records	
2007	Truth Dare	Various	Psychopathics from Outer Space 3	Joe & Joey Records	
2007	Hatchet Man	Various	Psychopathics from Outer Space 3	Joe & Joey Records	
2008	Alley Rat (Remix)	DJ Clay	Let 'Em Bleed: The Mixxtape, Vol. 1	Hatchet House	
2008	Get Ya Wicked On (Remix)	DJ Clay	Let 'Em Bleed: The Mixxtape, Vol. 1	Hatchet House	
2008	Rollin' Over (Rock Remix)	DJ Clay	Let 'Em Bleed: The Mixxtape, Vol. 2	Hatchet House	
2008	Kept Grindin'	DJ Clay	Let 'Em Bleed: The Mixxtape, Vol. 3	Hatchet House	
2009	I Shot A Hater	DJ Clay	Let 'Em Bleed: The Mixxtape, Vol. 4	Hatchet House	
2009	Hi-Rize (Remix)	DJ Clay	Let 'Em Bleed: The Mixxtape, Vol. 4	Hatchet House	
2010	Whoop!	DJ Clay	Book of the Wicked, Chapter One	Hatchet House	
2010	Who Is It?	DJ Clay	Book of the Wicked, Chapter Two	Hatchet House	
2013	Goblin	DJ Clay	A World Upside Down: The Mixxtape	Psychopathic Records/Hatchet House	
2013	When I'm Clownin' (Ceemix)	DJ Clay	A World Upside Down: The Mixxtape	Psychopathic Records/Hatchet House	
2013	SKREEEM!!!! (Joe Strange Remix)	DJ Clay	A World Upside Down: The Mixxtape	Psychopathic Records/Hatchet House	

- Let 'Em Bleed: The Mixxtape, Vol. 1 (2008) - "Fall Apart"
- Let 'Em Bleed: The Mixxtape, Vol. 2 (2008) - "Knee Crakaz", "Filthy"
- Let 'Em Bleed: The Mixxtape, Vol. 3 (2008) - "Can't Hold Us Back '08", "Can't Fuck With Us"
- Psychopathics from Outer Space Part 2 (2003)- Do It
- Psychopathics from Outer Space 3 (2008)- Last Day Alive

== Videography ==
- ICP's Strangle-Mania (1995), as "Handsome" Harley 'Gweedo' Guestella
- Shockumentary (1997), as Shaggy 2 Dope
- ECW Hardcore Heaven 1997, as Shaggy 2 Dope
- WWF Summerslam (1998), as Shaggy 2 Dope
- Backstage Sluts (1999), as Shaggy 2 Dope
- Strangle Mania 2 (1999), as "Handsome" Harley 'Gweedo' Guestella
- WCW Road Wild (1999), as Shaggy 2 Dope
- The Shaggy Show (2000), as Shaggy 2 Dope
- JCW, Volume One (2000), as "Handsome" Harley 'Gweedo' Guestella, and as Shaggy 2 Dope
- JCW, Volume 2 (2001), as "Handsome" Harley 'Gweedo' Guestella, and as Shaggy 2 Dope
- XPW Redemption (2001), as Shaggy 2 Dope
- Bootlegged in L.A. (2003), as Shaggy 2 Dope
- Psychopathic: The Videos (2007), as Shaggy 2 Dope
- JCW: SlamTV - Episodes 1 thru 9 (2007), as "Handsome" Harley 'Gweedo' Guestella
- JCW: SlamTV - Episodes 10 thru 15 featuring Bloodymania (2007), as "Handsome" Harley 'Gweedo' Guestella, and as Shaggy 2 Dope

== Filmography ==
=== Film appearances ===
- Big Money Hustlas (2000), as Sugar Bear
- Bowling Balls (2004), as Shaggy
- Death Racers (2008), as Shaggy 2 Dope
- Big Money Rustlas (2010), as Sugar Wolf

=== Television and internet programs ===
- The Shaggy Show (2000), as Shaggy 2 Dope
- Mad TV (2002), as Shaggy 2 Dope
- G4 TV (2006), as Shaggy 2 Dope
- Aqua Teen Hunger Force (2010), as Shaggy 2 Dope
- The Shaggy and The Creep Show (2020), as Shaggy 2 Dope w/ Kegan The Creep
