= Violent J discography =

- Studio albums: 1
- Extended plays: 3
- Singles: 4
- Music videos: 1

The discography of Joseph Bruce, an American rapper better known by his hip hop persona of the wicked clown Violent J, consists of one studio album, one single, and three extended plays. Music videos and collaborations are also included, as are film and television appearances, home video releases, and literary releases. In addition to his solo career, Bruce has also been involved with seven hip hop groups; JJ Boys (1988–1989), Inner City Posse (1989–1991), Insane Clown Posse (1991–present), Golden Goldies (1995), Dark Lotus (1998–2017), Psychopathic Rydas (1999–2017), Soopa Villainz (2002–2005) and The Killjoy Club (2013–2016).

He has gained success predominantly as a member of the duo Insane Clown Posse, where he has earned three gold albums and two platinum albums. Along with member Joseph Utsler, Bruce founded the independent record label Psychopathic Records with Alex Abbiss as manager in 1991. He has also produced, written, and starred in the feature films Big Money Hustlas and Big Money Rustlas.

== Solo albums ==
=== Studio albums ===
List of studio albums, with selected chart positions
Title	Album details	Peak chart positions			
Title	Album details	US	US R&B/HH	US Rap	US Indie
The Shining	Released: April 28, 2009; Label: Psychopathic Records	48	28	14	5
Bloody Sunday	Released: February 17, 2023; Label: Psychopathic Records	—	—	—	—
"—" denotes releases that did not chart, or was not released in that country.

=== Extended plays ===
List of extended plays, with selected chart positions
Title	Album details	Peak chart positions		
Title	Album details	US	US R&B/HH	US Indie
Enter the Ghetto Zone	Released: 1990; Label: N/A	—	—	—
Wizard of the Hood	Released: July 22, 2003; Label: Psychopathic	89	31	3
Brother!	Released: December 31, 2018; Label: Psychopathic	—	—	—
"—" denotes releases that did not chart, or was not released in that country.

== Singles ==
Year	Song	Artist	Album	Label
2003	Shiny Diamonds	Violent J	Wizard of the Hood EP	Psychopathic Records
2009	Jealousy	Violent J	The Shining	Psychopathic Records
2013	Fuck My Dad (Richard Bruce)	Violent J	Father's Day 2013 Single	Psychopathic Records
2016	Sick Kidz	Violent J, Young Wicked, Nova Rockafeller, Lil Eazy-E	Violent J Charity Solo Tour Single	Psychopathic Records

== Group albums ==
=== With Inner City Posse ===
Year	Album details
1990	Ghetto Territory: Released: 1990; Format: CS
1990	Intelligence and Violence: Released: 1990; Format: CS
1991	Bass-ment Cuts: Released: 1991; Label: Rude Time Records/Psychopathic Records; Format: CD, CS
1991	Dog Beats: Released: 1991; Label: Psychopathic Records; Format: CD, CS

=== With Insane Clown Posse ===
Year	Album details
1992	Carnival of Carnage: Released: October 18, 1992; Format: CS, CD
1994	Ringmaster: Released: March 8, 1994; Format: CS, CD
1995	Riddle Box: Released: October 10, 1995; Format: CS, CD
1997	The Great Milenko: Released: June 24, 1997; Format: CD
1999	The Amazing Jeckel Brothers: Released: May 25, 1999; Format: CD
2000	Bizaar: Released: October 31, 2000; Format: CD
2000	Bizzar: Released: October 31, 2000; Format: CD
2002	The Wraith: Shangri-La: Released: November 5, 2002; Format: CD
2004	The Wraith: Hell's Pit: Released: August 31, 2004; Format: CD
2007	The Tempest: Released: March 20, 2007; Format: CD
2009	Bang! Pow! Boom!: Released: September 1, 2009; Format: CD
2012	The Mighty Death Pop!: Released: August 14, 2012; Format: CD, Digital
2015	The Marvelous Missing Link: Lost: Released: April 28, 2015; Format: CD, Digital
2015	The Marvelous Missing Link: Found: Released: July 31, 2015; Format: CD, Digital
2019	Fearless Fred Fury: Released: December 7, 2018; Format: CD, Digital
2021	Yum Yum Bedlam: Released: October 31, 2021; Format: CD, Digital
2025	The Naught: Released: August 12, 2025; Format: CD, Digital

=== With Golden Goldies ===
Year	Album details
1995	Gimme Them Fuckin' Nuggets Bitch, Or I'll Punch Your Fuckin' Face: Released: 1995; Label: Psychopathic Records; Format: CD, CS

*Performed as Golden Jelly

=== With Dark Lotus ===
Year	Album details
2001	Tales from the Lotus Pod: Released: July 17, 2001; Format: CS, CD
2004	Black Rain: Released: April 6, 2004; Format: CS, CD
2008	The Opaque Brotherhood: Released: April 15, 2008; Format: CS, CD
2014	The Mud, Water, Air & Blood: Released: July 29, 2014; Format: CS, CD

=== With Psychopathic Rydas ===
*Performed as Bullet

Year	Album details
1999	Dumpin': Released: December 1999; Format: CS, CD
2001	Ryden Dirtay: Released: GOTJ 2001; Format: CS, CD
2004	Check Your Shit In Bitch!: Released: GOTJ 2004; Format: CS, CD
2007	Duk Da Fuk Down: Released: GOTJ 2007; Format: CS, CD
2011	Eat Shit N Die: Released: GOTJ 2011; Format: CS, CD

=== With Soopa Villainz ===
*Performed as Mr. Diamond

Year	Album details
2005	Furious: Released: August 11, 2005; Format: CS, CD

=== W/The Killjoy Club ===
Year	Album details
2014	Reindeer Games: Released: September 2, 2014; Format: CS, CD

=== W/3 Headed Monster ===
Year	Album details
2023	Obliteration: Released: June 1, 2023; Format: CS, CD
2023	Rampage: Released: September 13, 2023; Format: CS, CD

== Guest appearances ==
=== Solo ===
Year	Song	Artist	Album	Label	Role	Performed as
1998	Witching Hour	Myzery	Para la Isla EP	Psychopathic Records	Guest Verse	
2001	Panic Attack	Esham	Tongues	Reel Life Productions		
2001	Everyone	Esham	Tongues	Reel Life Productions		
2001	Str8 Outta Detroit (w/Anybody Killa)	Blaze Ya Dead Homie	1 Less G n da Hood	Psychopathic Records		
2002	Leff Field	Twiztid	Mirror Mirror EP	Psychopathic Records		
2003	Sticky Icky Situation (w/Blaze Ya Dead Homie & Esham)	Anybody Killa	Hatchet Warrior	Psychopathic Records		
2003	Gang Related	Anybody Killa	Hatchet Warrior	Psychopathic Records		
2003	Marsh Lagoon	Twiztid	The Green Book	Psychopathic Records		
2003	Boom!	Esham	Repentance	Psychopathic Records		
2003	Dem Boyz	Esham	Repentance	Psychopathic Records		
2004	Lil Secret	Twiztid	Cryptic Collection Vol. 3	Psychopathic Records		
2004	Down Here	Anybody Killa	Dirty History	Psychopathic Records		
2004	Mr. Deadfolx	Blaze Ya Dead Homie	Colton Grundy: The Undying	Psychopathic Records		
2005	Ima	Jumpsteady	Master of the Flying Guillotine	Psychopathic Records		
2005	So High	Twiztid	Man's Myth, Vol. 1	Psychopathic Records		
2005	Get Ready	Twiztid	Man's Myth, Vol. 1	Psychopathic Records		
2005	Manakin	Twiztid	Mutant, Vol. 2	Psychopathic Records		
2006	This Bitch (Mic Mix) (w/Monoxide Child)	Jamie Madrox	Phatso: Earth 2 Version	Psychopathic Records		
2007	Zip Codes N Time Zones	Blaze Ya Dead Homie	Clockwork Gray	Psychopathic Records		
2008	Freak Bitch	Boondox	Krimson Creek	Psychopathic Records		
2008	Trailer Park Creepin'	Boondox	Krimson Creek	Psychopathic Records		
2008	Sex, Drugs, Money & Murder pt. 2	Twiztid	Toxic Terror EP	Psychopathic Records		
2009	Hell Ride	Twiztid	End Of Days EP	Psychopathic Records		
2010	3 Evil Wizards	Blaze Ya Dead Homie	Gang Rags	Psychopathic Records		
2011	Born On Halloween	Vanilla Ice	W.T.F.			
2011	Nightline	Axe Murder Boyz	Body In A Hole EP	Hatchet House		
2012	Homies To Smoke With	Twiztid	Kronik Collection	Psychopathic Records		
2012	So High	Twiztid	Kronik Collection	Psychopathic Records		
2013	Mountain Climbing (w/Awesome Dre)	Big Hoodoo	Crystal Skull	Psychopathic Records		
2014	Kickdoe	Boondox	Abaddon	Psychopathic Records		
2014	Infectshun	Various	The Wormwood Tour EP	Mobstyle Music	Backing Vocals (w/Sugar Slam)	
2014	Knocking On Heavens Door (w/T.O.N.E.-z)	Myzery	Demon Angel	Poor Manz Entertainment		
2015	F U 2 (w/Yelawolf)	DJ Paul	Master Of Evil	Psychopathic Records		
2016	Run (w/JellyRoll & Madchild)	Bukshot	Non Album Single	Mobstyle Music		
2017	Foggin' Up The Window	Shaggy 2 Dope	F.T.F.O.M.F.	Psychopathic Records		
2018	Witching Hour	Myzery	20th Anniversary: Para la Isla	Psychopathic Records/Poor Manz Entertainment		
2018	The Demon Angel	Myzery	Knocking On Heavens Door	Psychopathic Records/Poor Manz Entertainment		
2022	Saddle Up And Ride	The Lucid	Saddle Up and Ride	SpoilerHead Records		
2023	Sweet Toof	The Lucid	Saddle Up and Ride	SpoilerHead Records		
2024	Til Death Do Us Part	Viking Barbie	N/A	Swenson Entertainment		

== w/Shaggy 2 Dope (Insane Clown Posse) ==
Year	Song	Artist	Album	Label	Performed As
1995	Graveyard	Project Born	Born Dead EP	Psychopathic Records	
1997	$85 Bucks An Hour	Twiztid	Mostasteless	Psychopathic Records	
1997	Spin The Bottle	Twiztid	Mostasteless	Psychopathic Records	
1997	Meat Cleaver (w/Myzery)	Twiztid	Mostasteless	Psychopathic Records	
1997	Hound Dogs (w/Blaze Ya Dead Homie)	Twiztid	Mostasteless	Psychopathic Records	Dark Lotus
2000	Wickit Klowns	Kottonmouth Kings	High Society	Suburban Noize Records	
2000	Just Another Crazy Click (w/Twiztid)	Three 6 Mafia	When the Smoke Clears: Sixty 6, Sixty 1		
2000	Shittalkaz (w/Twiztid)	Blaze Ya Dead Homie	Blaze Ya Dead Homie EP	Psychopathic Records	
2000	Maniac Killa	Twiztid	Freek Show	Psychopathic Records	
2000	All I Ever Wanted	Twiztid	Freek Show	Psychopathic Records	
2000	Wut Tha Dead Like	Twiztid	Freek Show	Psychopathic Records	
2001	Given Half A Chance (w/Twiztid)	Blaze Ya Dead Homie	1 Less G n da Hood	Psychopathic Records	
2001	Hatchet Execution (w/Twiztid)	Blaze Ya Dead Homie	1 Less G n da Hood	Psychopathic Records	
2001	I Don't Care	Twiztid	Cryptic Collection Vol. 2	Psychopathic Records	Dark Lotus
2001	Drunken Ninja Master (w/Drive-By)	Twiztid	Cryptic Collection Vol. 2	Psychopathic Records	Dark Lotus
2002	Ninjas In Action (w/Twiztid & Drive-By)	Jumpsteady	The Chaos Theory EP	Psychopathic Records	
2003	Hard Times	Esham	Repentance	Psychopathic Records	
2004	Keep It Movin	Twiztid	Cryptic Collection Vol. 3	Psychopathic Records	
2004	Shock & Awe	Twiztid	Cryptic Collection Vol. 3	Psychopathic Records	Dark Lotus
2005	Bonus Flavor	Twiztid	Man's Myth (Vol. 1)	Psychopathic Records	
2006	Lady In The Jaguar	Boondox	The Harvest	Psychopathic Records	
2007	Monsters Ball	Twiztid	Independents Day	Psychopathic Records	
2007	Think 4 Yourself (w/Lady Love)	Kottonmouth Kings	Cloud Nine	Suburban Noize Records	
2008	Walking After Midnight	Boondox	Krimson Creek	Psychopathic Records	
2008	Insane	Prozak	Tales from the Sick	Strange Music	
2008	U Ain't No Killa	Anybody Killa	Mudface	Psychopathic Records	
2010	Fuck The Police	Kottonmouth Kings	Long Live The Kings	Suburban Noize Records	
2010	Birthday	Blaze Ya Dead Homie	Gang Rags	Psychopathic Records	
2010	Keep It Wicked	Anybody Killa	Medicine Bag	Psychopathic Records	
2011	Gimme More	Twiztid	Cryptic Collection Vol. 4	Psychopathic Records	
2012	Abominationz	Twiztid	Abominationz	Psychopathic Records	
2013	Spells	Big Hoodoo	Crystal Skull	Psychopathic Records	
2014	Might Go Mad	Axe Murder Boyz	The Garcia Brothers	Psychopathic Records	
2014	My Night	Boondox	Abaddon	Psychopathic Records	
2015	Fuck Off	Kottonmouth Kings	Krown Power	United Family Music	
2016	Monster Squad (w/Axe Murder Boyz, Anybody Killa & DJ Paul)	Big Hoodoo	Asylum	Psychopathic Records	
2017	FTTBBR	Lyte	Psychopathic Monstar EP	Psychopathic Records	
2018	Diamonds	Ouija Macc	Gutterwater	Psychopathic Records	
2018	Let Me Go	Myzery	The Demon Angel	Psychopathic Records	

- Anybody Killa: Hatchet Warrior (2003) - "Gang Related", "Sticky Icky Situation"
- Anybody Killa: Dirty History (2004) - "Down Here", "Charlie Brown"
- Blaze Ya Dead Homie: 1 Less G n da Hood - (2001) "Str8 Outta Detroit", "Given Half The Chance", "Hatchet Execution"
- Blaze Ya Dead Homie: Colton Grundy: The Undying - (2004) "Mr. Dead Folx"
- Blaze Ya Dead Homie: Clockwork Gray - (2007) "Zip Codes 'n Time Zones"
- Boondox: South of Hell (2010) - "Watch Your Back"
- Boondox: The Harvest (2006)
- Boondox: Krimson Creek (2008) - "Freak Bitch", "Trailer Park Creepin'"
- Boondox: PunkinHed (2007) - "Sleep Stalker"
- Cold 187um a.k.a. Big Hutch: From Pomona With Love: The Mixtape (2011) - "Rock The Hate"
- Esham: Repentance (album) (2003) - "Dem Boyz"
- Esham: Race Riot (compilation) (2000) - "Cunt Killer"
- Jumpsteady: Chaos Theory (album) (2002) - "Joke Ya Mind"
- Jumpsteady: Master of the Flying Guillotine (album) (2005) - "Ima"
- Prozak:Tales from the Sick (2008) - "Insane"
- Shaggy 2 Dope: F.T.F.O. (2006) - "Fuck the Fuck Off", "They Shootin'" and "Half Full"
- Shaggy 2 Dope: Fuck Off! (1994) - "3 Rings","Fuck Off" and "Clown Love"
- Twiztid: Mirror Mirror - (2002) "Leff Field"
- Twiztid: The Green Book - (2004) "Marsh Lagoon"
- Twiztid: Cryptic Collection Vol. 3 - 2004 "Lil Secret"
- Twiztid: Man's Myth (Vol. 1) - (2005) - "So High", "Get Ready"
- Twiztid: Mutant (Vol. 2) - (2005) - "Manikin"
- Twiztid: The Toxic Terror Tour EP - (2008) - "Sex, Drugs, Money & Murder Ver. 2"
- Zug Izland: Cracked Tiles - (2003) - "Fire"
- Ol' Dirty Bastard: The Trials and Tribulations of Russell Jones - "Dirty & Stinkin'" & "Dirty & Stinkin'(Remix)"
- Myzery: Demon Angel - (2014) - "Knocking On Heaven's Door"

== Original contributions to compilation ==
=== Solo ===
Year	Song	Album Artist	Album	Label	Performed As
2003	Conquer (w/Esham & Anybody Killa)	Various	Psychopathics from Outer Space 2	Joe & Joey Records	Soopa Villainz (ft. Anybody Killa)
2003	Some Fuckin How	Various	Psychopathics from Outer Space 2	Joe & Joey Records	
2003	Mr. Sesame Seed (w/Anybody Killa)	Various	Psychopathics from Outer Space 2	Joe & Joey Records	
2007	Put It Down (w/Blaze Ya Dead Homie & Jamie Madrox)	Various	Psychopathics from Outer Space 3	Joe & Joey Records	
2007	If I Was God	Various	Psychopathics from Outer Space 3	Joe & Joey Records	
2008	Frankenstein	DJ Clay	Let 'Em Bleed: The Mixxtape, Vol. 1	Hatchet House	
2008	Global Warming	DJ Clay	Let 'Em Bleed: The Mixxtape, Vol. 1	Hatchet House	
2008	In Love With A Hooker (w/Esham)	DJ Clay	Let 'Em Bleed: The Mixxtape, Vol. 2	Hatchet House	
2008	4Ever Detroit (w/Blaze Ya Dead Homie & Awesome Dre)	DJ Clay	Let 'Em Bleed: The Mixxtape, Vol. 2	Hatchet House	
2008	Dead Man Walking	DJ Clay	Let 'Em Bleed: The Mixxtape, Vol. 2	Hatchet House	
2008	Duke Of The Wicked	DJ Clay	Let 'Em Bleed: The Mixxtape, Vol. 3	Hatchet House	
2010	The Opener	DJ Clay	Book of the Wicked, Chapter One	Hatchet House	
2010	Soopa Ninja	DJ Clay	Book of the Wicked, Chapter One	Hatchet House	
2010	Fuck The Radio (w/Bonez Dubb)	DJ Clay	Book of the Wicked, Chapter Two	Hatchet House	
2010	Hey Hoe (w/Young Wicked)	DJ Clay	Book of the Wicked, Chapter Two	Hatchet House	
2013	Officer Hatchet	DJ Clay	A World Upside Down: The Mixxtape	Hatchet House	

=== w/Shaggy 2 Dope ===
Year	Song	Album Artist	Album	Label	Performed As
2000	The Dirtball (w/Twiztid)	Various	Psychopathics from Outer Space	Joe & Joey Records	
2000	$50 Bucks	Various	Psychopathics from Outer Space	Joe & Joey Records	
2000	Sleep Walker	Various	Psychopathics from Outer Space	Joe & Joey Records	
2000	Slim Anus	Various	Psychopathics from Outer Space	Joe & Joey Records	
2000	Dead End (w/Ice-T)	Various	Psychopathics from Outer Space	Joe & Joey Records	
2000	The Amazing Maze	Various	Psychopathics from Outer Space	Joe & Joey Records	
2000	Meat Cleaver (w/Twiztid & Myzery)	Various	Psychopathics from Outer Space	Joe & Joey Records	
2003	Out There (w/Bushwick Bill)	Various	Psychopathics from Outer Space 2	Joe & Joey Records	
2003	Demon Faces (w/Twiztid, Esham & Anybody Killa)	Various	Psychopathics from Outer Space 2	Joe & Joey Records	
2003	Wicked Wild (w/Esham & 2 Live Crew)	Various	Psychopathics from Outer Space 2	Joe & Joey Records	
2003	Under The Big Top	Various	Psychopathics from Outer Space 2	Joe & Joey Records	
2007	Further Away	Various	Psychopathics from Outer Space 3	Joe & Joey Records	Dark Lotus
2007	Truth Dare	Various	Psychopathics from Outer Space 3	Joe & Joey Records	
2008	Alley Rat (Remix)	DJ Clay	Let 'Em Bleed: The Mixxtape, Vol. 1	Hatchet House	
2008	Get Ya Wicked On (Remix)	DJ Clay	Let 'Em Bleed: The Mixxtape, Vol. 1	Hatchet House	
2008	Rollin Over (Rock Remix)	DJ Clay	Let 'Em Bleed: The Mixxtape, Vol. 2	Hatchet House	
2008	Rare Never Before Heard "The Great Milenko Skit"	DJ Clay	Let 'Em Bleed: The Mixxtape, Vol. 3	Hatchet House	
2008	Kept Grindin (w/Twiztid, Drive-By, Axe Murder Boyz, Boondox & DJ Clay)	DJ Clay	Let 'Em Bleed: The Mixxtape, Vol. 3	Hatchet House	
2009	I Shot A Hater (w/Twiztid & Three 6 Mafia)	DJ Clay	Let 'Em Bleed: The Mixxtape, Vol. 4	Hatchet House	
2009	Hi-Rize (Remix)	DJ Clay	Let 'Em Bleed: The Mixxtape, Vol. 4	Hatchet House	
2010	Whoop! (w/Axe Murder Boyz & DJ Clay)	DJ Clay	Book of the Wicked, Chapter One	Hatchet House	
2010	Who Is It?	DJ Clay	Book of the Wicked, Chapter Two	Hatchet House	
2013	Goblin	DJ Clay	A World Upside Down: The Mixxtape	Hatchet House	
2013	When I'm Clownin (w/Kreayshawn) (Ceemix)	DJ Clay	A World Upside Down: The Mixxtape	Hatchet House	
2013	SKREEEM!!!! (w/Tech N9ne & Hopsin)	DJ Clay	A World Upside Down: The Mixxtape	Hatchet House	

- Psychopathics from Outer Space (2000) - "The Dirtball", "$50 Bucks", "Sleepwalker", "R-U-A Ryda?(as Psychopathic Rydas)", "Slim Anus", "Dead End(w/Ice-T)", "Red Neck Hoe '99(w/Twiztid)", "The Amazing Maze", "Who?(as Psychopathic Rydas)", "Meatcleaver(w/Twiztid & Myzery)"
- Psychopathics from Outer Space 2 (2003) - "Demon Face", "Conquer"(as Soopa Villainz featuring ABK), "Some Fuckin' How", "Graverobbers"(as Dark Lotus), "Wicked Wild featuring Esham, Fish & Gritz and Fresh Kid Ice of 2-Live Crew", "Mr. Sesame Seed", "Free Studio"(as Psychopathic Family)
- Psychopathics from Outer Space 3 (2007) - "Put It Down", "If I Was God", "Last Day Alive(Shaggy 2 Dope, Monoxide & Boondox)"
- The Butcher Shop (2008) - "Global Warming"
- Let 'Em Bleed: The Mixxtape, Vol. 1 (2008) - "Frankenstein", "Global Warming"
- Let 'Em Bleed: The Mixxtape, Vol. 2 (2008) - "In Love With A Hooker featuring Esham", "4Ever Detroit", "Dead Man Walking"
- Let 'Em Bleed: The Mixxtape, Vol. 3 (2008) - "Duke Of The Wicked", "Kept Grindin"
- Let 'Em Bleed: The Mixxtape, Vol. 4 (2009) - "I Shot a Hater"

== Videography ==
- ICP's Strangle-Mania (1995), as Diamond Donovan '3D' Douglas
- Shockumentary (1997), as Violent J
- ECW Hardcore Heaven (1997), as Violent J
- WWF Summerslam (1998), as Violent J
- Backstage Sluts (1999), as Violent J
- Strangle Mania 2 (1999), as Diamond Donovan '3D' Douglas
- WCW Road Wild (1999), as Violent J
- WCW Fall Brawl (1999), as Violent J
- Born Twiztid: Beyond the Freakshow (2000), as Violent J
- JCW, Volume 1 (2000), as Diamond Donovan '3D' Douglas, and as Violent J
- JCW, Volume 2 (2001), as "Diamond Donovan '3D' Douglas, and as Violent J
- XPW Redemption (2001), as Violent J
- JCW, Volume 3 (2003), as "Diamond Donovan '3D' Douglas, and as Violent J
- Bootlegged in L.A. (2003), as Violent J
- Psychopathic: The Videos (2007), as Violent J
- JCW: SlamTV - Episodes 1 thru 9 (2007), as Diamond Donovan '3D' Douglas
- JCW: SlamTV - Episodes 10 thru 15 featuring Bloodymania (2007), as Diamond Donovan '3D' Douglas, and as Violent J

== Filmography ==
=== Film appearances ===
- Big Money Hustlas (2000), as Big Baby Sweets/Ape Boy
- Bowling Balls (2004), as J
- Death Racers (2008), as Violent J
- Big Money Rustlas (2009), as Big Baby Chips

=== Television and internet programs ===
- ECW Hardcore TV (1997), as Violent J
- Monday Night Raw (1998), as Violent J
- WCW Monday Nitro (1999–2000), as Violent J
- WCW Thunder (1999), as Violent J
- The Shaggy Show (1999), as Violent J
- Mad TV (2002), as Violent J
- NWA Total Nonstop Action (2004), as Violent J
- Aqua Teen Hunger Force (2010), as Violent J

== Bibliography ==
- Behind the Paint by Violent J with Hobey Echlin (2003) - Autobiography ISBN 0-9741846-0-8

== Music videos ==
Year	Song	Additional Performers	Album	Label	Director
2009	Jealousy		The Shining	Psychopathic Records	
