= Insane Clown Posse discography =

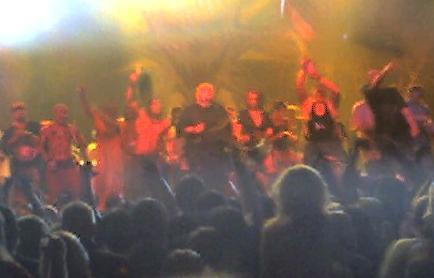
- Insane Clown Posse performing live
- Studio albums: 17
- Extended plays: 22
- Compilation albums: 19
- Singles: 84
- B-sides: 2
- Video albums: 11
- Music videos: 46
- Box sets: 3
- Other albums: 17

The discography of Insane Clown Posse, an American hip hop duo from Delray, Detroit, composed of Joseph Bruce and Joseph Utsler, who perform under the respective personas of the wicked clowns Violent J and Shaggy 2 Dope, consists of 17 studio albums introduced supernatural—and horror-themed lyrics as a means of distinguishing itself stylistically. Insane Clown Posse founded the independent record label Psychopathic Records with Alex Abbiss as manager, and produced and starred in the feature films Big Money Hustlas and Big Money Rustlas. They have collaborated with many famous hip hop and rock musicians. They have earned three gold albums, one platinum album, and one multi-platinum album.

They have been in several supergroups such as Golden Goldies (1995), Dark Lotus (1998–2018), Psychopathic Rydas (1999–2018), Soopa Villainz (2002–2005), The Killjoy Club (2013–2016; 2018–present), The Loony Goons (2018–2023) and 3 Headed Monster (2023–present).

== Albums ==
=== Studio albums ===
Year	Album details	Joker's card position	Peak chart positions						RIAA certification (sales thresholds)	Sales
Year	Album details	Joker's card position	US	US Indie	US Rap	US Heat	AUS	UK	RIAA certification (sales thresholds)	Sales
1992	Carnival of Carnage: Released: October 1992; Label: Psychopathic; Format: CD, CS	First Deck, First Card	—	—	—	—	—	—		
1994	Ringmaster: Released: March 8, 1994; Label: Psychopathic; Format: CD, CS	First Deck, Second Card	—	—	—	—	—	—	RIAA: Gold	
1995	Riddle Box: Released: October 10, 1995; Label: Psychopathic; Format: CD, CS, LP	First Deck, Third Card	—	—	—	16	—	—	RIAA: Gold	
1997	The Great Milenko: Released: June 24, 1997; Label: Hollywood; Format: CD, CS, LP	First Deck, Fourth Card	63	—	—	—	—	169	RIAA: 2× Platinum	US: 1,700,000
1999	The Amazing Jeckel Brothers: Released: May 25, 1999; Label: Psychopathic; Format: CD, CS, LP	First Deck, Fifth Card	4	—	—	—	—	99	RIAA: Platinum	
2000	Bizaar: Released: October 31, 2000; Label: Psychopathic; Format: CD, CS	—N/a	20	—	—	—	—	—		US: 200,000
2000	Bizzar: Released: October 31, 2000; Label: Psychopathic; Format: CD, CS	—N/a	21	—	—	—	—	—		US: 200,000
2002	The Wraith: Shangri-La: Released: November 5, 2002; Label: Psychopathic; Format: CD, LP	First Deck, Sixth Card, Part One	15	1	—	—	71	—		
2004	The Wraith: Hell's Pit: Released: August 31, 2004; Label: Psychopathic; Format: CD, download	First Deck, Sixth Card, Part Two	12	1	—	—	49	184		US: 220,000
2007	The Tempest: Released: March 20, 2007; Label: Psychopathic; Format: CD, download	—N/a	20	2	8	—	—	—		
2009	Bang! Pow! Boom!: Released: September 1, 2009; Label: Psychopathic; Format: CD, download	Second Deck, First Card	4	1	3	—	—	—		US: 164,000
2012	The Mighty Death Pop!: Released: August 14, 2012; Label: Psychopathic; Format: CD, download	Second Deck, Second Card	4	1	3	—	—	—		US: 99,000
2015	The Marvelous Missing Link: Lost: Released: April 28, 2015; Label: Psychopathic; Format: CD, download	Second Deck, Third Card, Part One	15	2	2	—	—	—		
2015	The Marvelous Missing Link: Found: Released: July 31, 2015; Label: Psychopathic; Format: CD, download	Second Deck, Third Card, Part Two	136	9	9	—	—	—		
2019	Fearless Fred Fury: Released: February 15, 2019; Label: Psychopathic; Format: CD, download	Second Deck, Fourth Card	44	2	24	—	—	—		
2021	Yum Yum Bedlam: Released: October 31, 2021; Label: Psychopathic; Format: CD, download	Second Deck, Fifth Card	—	—	—	—	—	—		
2025	The Naught: Released: August 12, 2025; Label: Psychopathic; Format: CD, download	Second Deck, Sixth Card	—	—	—	—	—	—		
"—" denotes releases that did not chart or were not released in that territory.

=== Cover albums ===
Year	Album details
2012	Smothered, Covered & Chunked: Released: August 14, 2012; Label: Psychopathic; Format: CD, download

=== Compilations ===
Year	Album details	Peak chart positions			RIAA certification (sales thresholds)
Year	Album details	US	US Indie	US Rap	RIAA certification (sales thresholds)
1995	Forgotten Freshness: Released: August 22, 1995; Label: Psychopathic; Format: CD, CS	—	—	—	
1997	Mutilation Mix: Released: April 1, 1997; Label: Island/Psychopathic; Format: CD, CS	—	—	—	
1998	Forgotten Freshness Volumes 1 & 2: Released: August 18, 1998; Label: Island/Psychopathic; Format: CD, CS	46	—	—	RIAA: Gold
2001	Forgotten Freshness Volume 3: Released: December 18, 2001; Label: Psychopathic; Format: CD	—	10	—	
2002	The Pendulum: Released: August 20, 2002; Label: Psychopathic; Format: CD	—	—	—	
2005	Forgotten Freshness Volume 4: Released: November 29, 2005; Label: Psychopathic; Format: CD, download	88	4	20	
2006	The Wraith: Remix Albums: Released: November 14, 2006; Label: Psychopathic; Format: CD, download	158	9	23	
2007	Jugganauts: The Best of Insane Clown Posse: Released: October 30, 2007; Label: Island/Psychopathic; Format: CD, download	124	—	23	
2010	The Old Shit: Released: May 14, 2010; Label: Psychopathic; Format: CD, download	—	—	—	
2011	Icon: Released: June 21, 2011; Label: Island/UMe; Format: CD, download	—	—	—	
2011	Featuring Freshness: Released: November 1, 2011; Label: Psychopathic; Format: CD, download	193	30	14	
2012	Mike E. Clark's Extra Pop Emporium: Released: August 14, 2012; Label: Psychopathic; Format: CD, download	—	—	—	
2013	Forgotten Freshness Volume 5: Released: October 29, 2013; Label: Psychopathic; Format: CD, download	—	41	13	
2014	20th Anniversary Hallowicked: Released: ShockFest Tour (October 2014); Label: Psychopathic; Format: CD	—	—	—	
2015	The Marvelous Missing Link: Outtakes: Released: October 9, 2015; Label: Psychopathic; Format: CD, download	—	—	—	
2015	20th Anniversary: Riddle Box: Released: November 20, 2015; Label: Psychopathic; Format: CD, download	—	—	—	
2017	Incredible Collectable Collection: Released: GOTJ 2017; Label: Psychopathic; Format: CD	—	—	—	
2017	20th Anniversary: The Great Milenko: Released: September 1, 2017; Label: Psychopathic; Format: CD, download	—	—	—	
2019	Forgotten Freshness, Vol. 6: Released: June 14, 2019; Label: Psychopathic; Format: CD, download	—	—	—	
"—" denotes releases that did not chart or were not released in that territory.

=== Collaboration albums ===
List of studio albums, with selected chart positions and certifications
Title	Album details	Peak chart positions			
Title	Album details	US	US Indie	US Rap	US R&B
GOTJ 2005 (with ABK, Twiztid, Blaze)	Released: GOTJ 2005; Label: Psychopathic; Format: CD	—	—	—	—
American Psycho (with Twiztid)	Released: American Psycho Tour 2011; Label: Psychopathic; Format: CD	—	—	—	—
Reindeer Games (as The Killjoy Club with Da Mafia 6ix)	Released: September 2, 2014; Label: Psychopathic; Formats: CD, digital download	133	24	12	20
"—" denotes releases that did not chart or were not released in that territory.

=== Extended plays ===
Year	EP details	Peak chart positions		
Year	EP details	US	US Indie	US Rap
1990	Enter the Ghetto Zone: Released: 1990; Label: N/A; Format: CS	—	—	—
1990	Ghetto Territory: Released: 1990; Label: Rude Time Productions; Format: CS	—	—	—
1990	Intelligence and Violence: Released: 1990; Label: Rude Time Productions; Format: CS	—	—	—
1991	Bass-ment Cuts: Released: 1991; Label: Double A Productions; Format: CD, CS	—	—	—
1991	Dog Beats: Released: February 4, 1991; Label: Psychopathic; Format: CD, CS	—	—	—
1993	Beverly Kills 50187: Released: July 16, 1993; Label: Psychopathic; Format: CD, CS	—	—	—
1994	The Terror Wheel: Released: August 5, 1994; Label: Psychopathic; Format: CD, CS	—	—	—
1994	A Carnival Christmas: Released: December 6, 1994; Label: Psychopathic; Format: CD, CS	—	—	—
1996	Tunnel of Love: Released: June 11, 1996; Label: Psychopathic; Format: CD, CS	—	—	—
2000	Dark Carnival Action Figures: Released: 2000; Label: Psychopathic; Format: CD	—	—	—
2005	The Calm: Released: May 17, 2005; Label: Psychopathic; Format: CD, download	32	1	5
2007	Eye of the Storm: Released: August 20, 2007; Label: Psychopathic; Format: CD, download	—	—	—
2014	House of Wax: Released: November 25, 2014; Label: Psychopathic; Format: CD, download	—	—	—
2015	Phantom X-tra Spooky Edition: Released: December 10, 2015; Label: Psychopathic; Format: CD, download	—	—	—
2018	Hell's Cellar: Released: GOTJ 2018; Label: Psychopathic; Format: CD, download	—	—	—
2018	Willaby Rags: Magical Bag of Poop: Released: GOTJ 2018; Label: Psychopathic; Format: CD, download	—	—	—
2019	Flip the Rat: Released: February 15, 2019; Label: Psychopathic; Format: CD, download	—	—	—
2021	You Produce (ICP's House Party Peep Show): Released: February 12, 2021; Label: Psychopathic; Format: CD	—	—	—
2021	Yum Yum's Lure: Released: February 17, 2021; Label: Psychopathic; Format: CD, download	—	—	—
2022	Wicked Vic the Weed: Released: February 17, 2022; Label: Psychopathic; Format: CD, download	—	—	—
2022	Pug Ugly the Stink Bud: Released: August 5, 2022; Label: Psychopathic; Format: CD, download	—	—	—
2023	Woh the Weeping Weirdo: Released: July 5, 2023; Label: Psychopathic; Format: CD, download	—	—	—

=== Box sets ===
Year	Album details
2000	Hallowicked 2000: Release: October 31, 2000; Label: Psychopathic; Format: 4×CD
2002	The Juggalo Show: The Complete Collection: Release: May 15, 2002; Label: Psychopathic; Format: 8×CD
2014	The First Six: Release: November 25, 2014; Label: Psychopathic; Format: 8×CD+2×DVD

=== Solo albums ===
Year	Artist	Album details	Peak chart positions		
Year	Artist	Album details	US	US Indie	US Rap
1994	Shaggy 2 Dope	Fuck Off! EP: Release: 1994; Label: Psychopathic; Format: CD	—	42	—
2003	Violent J	Wizard of the Hood EP: Release: July 22, 2003; Label: Psychopathic; Format: CD	89	3	—
2006	Shaggy 2 Dope	F.T.F.O.: Release: February 21, 2006; Label: Psychopathic; Format: CD	88	7	—
2009	Violent J	The Shining: Release: April 28, 2009; Label: Psychopathic; Format: CD, digital	48	5	14
2017	Shaggy 2 Dope	F.T.F.O.M.F.: Release: May 26, 2017; Label: Psychopathic; Format: CD, digital	72	1	—
2019	Violent J	Brother EP: Release: January 3, 2019; Label: Psychopathic; Format: CD, digital	—	—	—
2019	Shaggy 2 Dope	Gloomy Sunday EP: Release: January 10, 2019; Label: Psychopathic; Format: CD, digital	—	—	—
2023	Violent J	Bloody Sunday: Release: February 17, 2023; Label: Psychopathic; Format: CD, digital	—	—	—
2023	Shaggy 2 Dope	Professor Shaggs and the Quest for the Ultimate Groove EP: Release: May 25, 2023; Label: Psychopathic; Format: CD, digital	—	—	—
"—" denotes releases that did not chart or were not released in that territory.

=== Group albums ===
Year	Group	Album	Peak chart positions				Label
Year	Group	Album	US	US Indie	US Rap	US Heat	Label
December 1999	Psychopathic Rydas	Dumpin'	—	—	—	—	Joe & Joey Records
July 17, 2001	Dark Lotus	Tales from the Lotus Pod	158	6	—	1	Psychopathic Records
GOTJ 2001	Psychopathic Rydas	Ryden Dirtay	—	—	—	—	Joe & Joey Records
GOTJ 2001	Psychopathic Rydas	The Ryda EP	—	—	—	—	Joe & Joey Records
April 6, 2004	Dark Lotus	Black Rain	71	3	—	—	Psychopathic Records
GOTJ 2004	Psychopathic Rydas	Check Your Shit in Bitch!	—	—	—	—	Joe & Joey Records
GOTJ 2004	Psychopathic Rydas	Limited Edition EP	—	—	—	—	Joe & Joey Records
August 11, 2005	Soopa Villainz	Furious	92	9	—	—	Psychopathic Records
GOTJ 2007	Psychopathic Rydas	Duk Da Fuk Down	—	—	—	—	Joe & Joey Records
April 15, 2008	Dark Lotus	The Opaque Brotherhood	45	4	7	—	Psychopathic Records
GOTJ 2011	Psychopathic Rydas	EatShitNDie	—	—	—	—	Joe & Joey Records
GOTJ 2011	Psychopathic Rydas	Backdoor Ryda EP	—	—	—	—	Joe & Joey Records
July 29, 2014	Dark Lotus	The Mud, Water, Air & Blood	43	4	4	—	Psychopathic Records
September 2, 2014	The Killjoy Club	Reindeer Games	133	24	12	—	Psychopathic Records
March 1, 2018	Psychopathic Family	Hurricane of Diamonds	—	—	—	—	Psychopathic Records
June 2023	3 Headed Monster	Obliteration	—	—	—	—	Psychopathic Records
September 2023	3 Headed Monster	Rampage	—	—	—	—	Psychopathic Records

=== Label compilation albums ===
Year	Group	Album	Label
2000	Various	Psychopathics from Outer Space	Psychopathic/Joe & Joey
2003	Various	Psychopathics from Outer Space 2	Psychopathic/Joe & Joey
2007	Various	Psychopathics from Outer Space 3	Psychopathic/Joe & Joey
2018	Various	Hurricane of Diamonds	Psychopathic/Joe & Joey

== Singles ==
=== As lead artist ===
Year	Single	Peak chart positions		Certifications	Album
Year	Single	US	UK	Certifications	Album
1989	"Party at the Top of the Hill" (as JJ Boys)	—	—		Non-album single
1994	"Psychopathic"	—	—		Carnival of Carnage
1994	"Chicken Huntin'"	—	—		Ringmaster
1995	"Chicken Huntin' (Slaughter House Remix)"	—	—		Riddle Box
1995	"Fat Sweaty Betty"	—	—		Forgotten Freshness
1995	"The Joker's Wild"	—	—		Riddle Box
1997	"Halls of Illusions"	—	56		The Great Milenko
1997	"Hokus Pokus (Headhunta'z Remix)"	—	53	RIAA: Gold	Forgotten Freshness Volumes 1 & 2
1997	"Santa's a Fat Bitch"	67	—		Forgotten Freshness Volumes 1 & 2
1998	"How Many Times?"	—	—		The Great Milenko
1999	"The Dirt Ball" (with Twiztid)	—	—		Heavy Metal 2000 Soundtrack
1999	"Another Love Song"	—	—		The Amazing Jeckel Brothers
1999	"Fuck the World"	—	—		The Amazing Jeckel Brothers
1999	"Mad Professor"	118	—		The Amazing Jeckel Brothers
1999	"Terrible"	—	—		The Amazing Jeckel Brothers
2000	"Jacob's Word"	—	—		Dark Carnival Action Figures EP
2000	"Let's Go All the Way"	—	—		Bizzar
2000	"Tilt-A-Whirl"	—	—		Bizaar
2002	"Homies" (with Twiztid)	—	—		The Wraith: Shangri-La
2002	"Hell's Forecast"/"Murder Rap"	—	—		The Wraith: Shangri-La
2004	"Bowling Balls"	—	—		The Wraith: Hell's Pit
2005	"The People"	—	—		Forgotten Freshness Volume 4
2007	"I Do This!"	—	—		The Tempest
2007	"The Tower"	—	—		The Tempest
2009	"The Bone"	—	—		Bang! Pow! Boom!
2009	"In Yo Face"	—	—		Bang! Pow! Boom!
2010	"Miracles"	—	—		Bang! Pow! Boom!
2010	"Juggalo Island"	—	—		Bang! Pow! Boom!
2010	"Fonz Pond"	—	—		Bang! Pow! Boom!
2011	"It's All Over"	—	—		Bang! Pow! Boom!
2011	"Leck mich im Arsch" b/w "Mountain Girl"	—	—		Music: W.A.Mozart / Music: Jack White III
2012	"Chris Benoit"	—	—		The Mighty Death Pop!
2012	"Freaky Tales"	—	—		The Mighty Death Pop!
2012	"Night of the Chainsaw"	—	—		The Mighty Death Pop!
2013	"Jump Around"	—	—		Smothered, Covered & Chunked
2013	"Hate Her to Death"	—	—		The Mighty Death Pop!
2013	"Where's God?"	—	—		The Mighty Death Pop!
2013	"When I'm Clownin' (Danny Brown Remix)" (with Boondox & Danny Brown)	—	—		The Mighty Death Pop!
2014	"Forever"	—	—		The Mighty Death Pop!
2015	"Vomit"	—	—		The Marvelous Missing Link: Lost
2015	"Explosions"	—	—		The Marvelous Missing Link: Lost
2015	"Juggalo Party"	—	—		The Marvelous Missing Link: Found
2016	"Falling Apart"	—	—		The Marvelous Missing Link: Lost
2016	"I See the Devil"	—	—		The Marvelous Missing Link: Lost
2017	"Beautiful (Indestructible)"	—	—		Covered, Smothered & Chunked
2017	"4 Life"	—	—		Non-album singles
2017	"6 Foot 7 Foot" (with Lyte)	—	—		Non-album singles
2017	"Fuck My Dad (Richard Bruce)" (with Lyte, Jumpsteady & Shaggy 2 Dope)	—	—		Non-album singles
2017	"Black Blizzard"	—	—		20th Anniversary: The Great Milenko
2018	"Cusswords"	—	—		Hurricane of Diamonds
2018	"Hair Up"	—	—		Hurricane of Diamonds
2018	"Bleep"	—	—		Hurricane of Diamonds
2018	"W.T.F.!"	—	—		Fearless Fred Fury
2019	"Fury"	—	—		Fearless Fred Fury
2019	"Satellite"	—	—		Fearless Fred Fury
2020	"Nobody's Fault"	—	—		Fearless Fred Fury
2020	"Ding Ding Doll"	—	—		Yum Yum Lure
2000	"Bizaar Bizzar Sampler"	—	—		Bizaar/Bizzar
2025	"Dark Side" (with Whitney Peyton)	—	—		Non-album singles
"—" denotes singles that did not chart.

=== Other certified songs ===
Year	Song	Certifications	Album
1997	"Boogie Woogie Wu"	RIAA: Gold	The Great Milenko
1997	"Neden Game"	RIAA: Gold	The Great Milenko
2000	"My Axe"	RIAA: Gold	Bizzar
2004	"In My Room"	RIAA: Platinum	Hell's Pit

=== Hallowicked singles ===
Year	Single
1994	Dead Pumpkins
1995	Mr. Rotten Treats
1996	Witches and Warlocks: 1. Dead Pumpkins; 2. Mr. Rotten Treats; 3. Halloween on Military St.; 4. Witches and Warlocks Interview
1997	Mr. Johnson's Head Remix
1998	Pumpkin Carver: 1. Pumpkin Carver; 2. Interview
1999	Sleep Walker
2000	Hallowicked 2000: 1. Toxic Love; 2. Pumpkin Carver; 3. Halloween on Military St.; 4. Dead Pumpkins; 5. Mr. Rotten Treats; 6. Mr. Johnson's Head Remix; 7. Sleep Walker; 8. Twiztid – Juggalo Party
2001	Hallowicked 2001: 1. Insane Clown Posse – Every Halloween; 2. Blaze Ya Dead Homie – Children of the Wasteland; 3. Twiztid – Waited Til Halloween
2002	Hallowicked 2002: 1. Soopa Villainz – Silence of the Hams; 2. Blaze – Dead Body Man 2002
2003	Thug Pit
2004	Murda Cloak
2005	Wicked Hellaween
2006	Blood Redrum: 1. Blood Redrum; 2. Blood Redrum (Instrumental)
2007	Evil Is Afraid
2008	I'm Your Killer
2009	If I Ate Your Brains
2010	Hallowicked 2010: 1. Insane Clown Posse – This Halloween is Crazy; 2. Insane Clown Posse – Scary Kidz; 3. Axe Murder Boyz – My House
2011	I Saw A Monster
2012	Amber Alert
2013	Hallowicked 2013: 1. Insane Clown Posse – Halloween Head; 2. Boondox – Devil's Night
2014	Red Moon Howl
2015	Haunted By The Devil
2016	Who U Know?
2017	Bloody Screams of 17: 1. Intro; 2. Violent J, Lyte & Ouija – Noided, Heated & Jelly; 3. Big Hoodoo – Legacy; 4. Zug Izland – Brick in the Wall; 5. Esham – THEDEADAWINNER; 6. Myzery & The Spanish Side – A Psycho; 7. Motown Rage – Hummer; 8. Mike E. Clark – Satan Is Her Name; 9. Ouija – Dead Body Man 3
2018	Judgement Day 2018
2019	The Dark
2020	Mr. Nothing Man
2021	FUN!
2022	Something's In My Room
2023	Bite Night
2024	Devil's Night
2025	Dead Bodies

== Guest appearances ==
Year	Artist(s)	Album	Song	Member
1995	Cykosis	Cykodelichell Bold	Bloodstains	
1995	Project Born	Born Dead	Graveyard	
1996	Coup Detroit	Coup Detroit	Get Yo Ass Off The Couch	
1996	Humble Gods	No Heroes	Running Out of Time	
1997	Twiztid	Mostasteless	85 Bucks an Hour, Meat Cleaver	
1998	Myzery	Para La Isla	Witching Hour	Violent J
1998	Mancow	In The Kingdom Of The Blind The One Eyed Man Is King	3 Little Piggies	
1998	Mancow	In The Kingdom Of The Blind The One Eyed Man Is King	We Down With The Cow!	
1999	Twiztid	Mostasteless	Spin the Bottle	
1999	Twiztid	Mostasteless	Hound Dogs	
2000	Blaze Ya Dead Homie	Blaze Ya Dead Homie	Shittalkaz	
2000	Kottonmouth Kings	High Society	Wickit Klowns	
2000	Three 6 Mafia	When the Smoke Clears: Sixty 6, Sixty 1	Just Anotha Crazy Click	
2000	Twiztid	Cryptic Collection	Meat Cleaver	
2000	Twiztid	Freek Show	All I Ever Wanted	
2000	Twiztid	Freek Show	Wut tha Dead Like	
2000	Twiztid	Freek Show	Maniac Killa	
2001	Blaze Ya Dead Homie	1 Less G n da Hood	Given Half the Chance	
2001	Blaze Ya Dead Homie	1 Less G n da Hood	Hatchet Execution	
2001	Twiztid	Cryptic Collection Vol. 2	I Don't Care	
2001	Twiztid	Cryptic Collection Vol. 2	Drunken Ninja Master	
2001	Vanilla Ice	Bi-Polar	Insane Killas	
2002	Anybody Killa	Hatchet Warrior	Sticky Icky Situation	Violent J
2002	Anybody Killa	Hatchet Warrior	Now You Know	Shaggy 2 Dope
2002	Anybody Killa	Hatchet Warrior	Gang Related	
2002	Esham	Acid Rain	Narration 1-3	
2002	Esham	Acid Rain	Panic Attack	
2002	Esham	Acid Rain	Everyone	
2002	Esham	Acid Rain	Migraine Headache	
2002	Esham	Acid Rain	La La La	
2002	Esham	Acid Rain	P-P-P-Pow!	
2002	Esham	Acid Rain	How Do I Plead to Homicide	
2002	Esham	Acid Rain	Redemption	
2002	Ol' Dirty Bastard	The Trials and Tribulations of Russell Jones	Dirty & Stinkin	
2002	Ol' Dirty Bastard	The Trials and Tribulations of Russell Jones	Dirty & Stinkin (Remix)	
2002	Jumpsteady	The Chaos Theory	Ninjas In Action	Insane Clown Posse
2003	Twiztid	The Green Book	Call Me	
2003	Twiztid	The Green Book	I'm the Only 1	Shaggy 2 Dope
2003	Twiztid	The Green Book	Marsh Lagoon	Violent J
2003	Zug Izland	Cracked Tiles	Fire	
2003	Zug Izland	Cracked Tiles	Prison Song	
2003	Zug Izland	Cracked Tiles	Fly	
2003	Zug Izland	Cracked Tiles	Small Town	
2003	Zug Izland	Cracked Tiles	Always	
2003	Zug Izland	Cracked Tiles	Hiroshima	
2003	Esham	Repentance	Hard Times	
2003	Esham	Repentance	Boom	
2004	Blaze Ya Dead Homie	Colton Grundy: The Undying	Climbing	
2004	Fresh Kid Ice	Freaky Chinese	Swingin Hatchets	
2004	Fresh Kid Ice	Freaky Chinese	Tour Bus	
2005	Twiztid	Man's Myth	Bonus Flavor	
2005	Twiztid	Mutant (Vol. 2)	Manikin	
2006	Axe Murder Boyz	Blood In, Blood Out	Calm Down	
2006	Axe Murder Boyz	Blood In, Blood Out	Heatseeker	
2006	Boondox	Krimson Creek	Lady In The Jaguar	
2007	Twiztid	Independents Day	Monster's Ball	
2007	Kottonmouth Kings	Cloud Nine	Think 4 Yourself	
2008	Anybody Killa	Mudface	You Ain't No Killa	
2008	Boondox	The Harvest	Walking After Midnight	
2008	DJ Clay	Let 'Em Bleed: The Mixxtape, Vol. 1	"Alley Rat [Remix]"	
2008	DJ Clay	Let 'Em Bleed: The Mixxtape, Vol. 1	"Frankenstein"	Violent J
2008	DJ Clay	Let 'Em Bleed: The Mixxtape, Vol. 1	"Fall Apart"	Shaggy 2 Dope
2008	DJ Clay	Let 'Em Bleed: The Mixxtape, Vol. 1	"Get Ya Wicked On [Remix]"	
2008	DJ Clay	Let 'Em Bleed: The Mixxtape, Vol. 1	"Global Warming"	
2008	DJ Clay	Let 'Em Bleed: The Mixxtape, Vol. 2	"Rollin' Over [Rock Mix]"	
2008	DJ Clay	Let 'Em Bleed: The Mixxtape, Vol. 3	"They Shootin (Rock Mix)"	
2008	DJ Clay	Let 'Em Bleed: The Mixxtape, Vol. 3	"Rare Never Heard Before Milenko Skit"	
2008	DJ Clay	Let 'Em Bleed: The Mixxtape, Vol. 3	"Duke Of Tha Wicked"	
2008	DJ Clay	Let 'Em Bleed: The Mixxtape, Vol. 3	"Can't Hold Me Back '08"	
2008	DJ Clay	Let 'Em Bleed: The Mixxtape, Vol. 3	"Can't Fuck Wit Us	
2008	DJ Clay	Let 'Em Bleed: The Mixxtape, Vol. 3	"Kept Grindin"	
2008	Project Born	Born Dead 2	Fuck With Me	
2008	Prozak	Tales From The Sick	Insane	
2009	Mike E. Clark	Psychopathic Murder Mix Volume 1	"Whoz Goin Next (Triple X Mash Up)"	
2009	Mike E. Clark	Psychopathic Murder Mix Volume 1	"Chickin "Pluckin" Huntin Remix"	
2009	Mike E. Clark	Psychopathic Murder Mix Volume 1	"Rock The Dead Body Man"	
2009	Mike E. Clark	Psychopathic Murder Mix Volume 1	"Neck Cutter"	
2009	Mike E. Clark	Psychopathic Murder Mix Volume 1	"How Long Will You Juggalos Be Down"	
2009	Mike E. Clark	Psychopathic Murder Mix Volume 1	"Willabe Rags Argues With Violent J"	
2009	Mike E. Clark	Psychopathic Murder Mix Volume 1	"Southwest Mash Up"	
2009	DJ Clay	Let 'Em Bleed: The Mixxtape, Vol. 4	"I Shot A Hater"	
2009	DJ Clay	Let 'Em Bleed: The Mixxtape, Vol. 4	"Hi-Rize (Remix)"	
2009	Twiztid	Twiztid Presents: Cryptic Collection Holiday Edition	"Murder City Christmas"	
2010	Kottonmouth Kings	Long Live the Kings	Fuck the Police	
2010	Boondox	South of Hell	Watch Your Back	
2010	Chop Shop	Welcome To The Chop Shop	We Got It	
2010	Anybody Killa	Medicine Bag	Kept It Wicked	
2011	Vanilla Ice	WTF	Born on Halloween	Violent J
2011	Jack White	Non-Album Single	Leck Mich Im Arsch	
2011	Jack White	Non-Album Single	Mountain Girl	
2011	The Dayton Family	Charges of Indictment	The Gathering	
2012	DJ Paul	For I've Sinned: Hosted By DJ Scream & DJ Black	Go and Kill	
2012	Twiztid	Abominationz	Abominationz	
2013	Big Hoodoo	Crystal Skull	Spells	
2013	Myzery	Demon/Angel	Knockin On Heaven's Door	
2014	Axe Murder Boyz	The Garcia Brothers	Might Go Mad	
2014	Boondox	Abbadon	Kikdoe	Violent J
2014	Boondox	Abbadon	My Night	
2015	Da Mafia 6ix	Watch What U Wish...	Mosh Pit (w/ Lil' White)	
2015	Kottonmouth Kings	Krown Power	Fuck Off	
2015	DJ Paul	Master Of Evil	F U 2 (w/ Yelawolf)	Violent J
2016	Twiztid	Mutant: Remixed and Remastered	Manikin	
2016	Big Hoodoo	Asylum	Monster Squad (w/Anybody Killa, Axe Murder Boyz & DJ Paul)	
2016	JellyRoll & Lil Wyte	No Filter 2	Zombie (w/Madchild)	
2017	Twiztid	Cryptic Collection: Valentine's Day Edition	She Ain't Afraid	Shaggy 2 Dope
2017	Fisty Cuffs		After School Special	
2017	Lyte	Psychopathic Monstar EP	FTTBBR	
2017	Bukshot	Weirdo	Run (w/Madchild)	
2018	Ouija Macc	GutterWater	Diamonds	
2018	Myzery	20th Anniversary: Para la Isla	Da Way We Live (w/Nitemare)	
2018	Myzery	20th Anniversary: Para la Isla	Witching Hour	
2018	Myzery	The Demon Angel	Let Me Go	
2018	Myzery	The Demon Angel	Knocking On Heavens Door	
2020	Project Born	Born Dead 3: The Reapers Revenge	Techniques & Tactics	
2020	Project Born	Born Dead 3: The Reapers Revenge	Round Here	
2022	Ouija Macc	Stalewind	You're Dead	Violent J
2023	Hexxx	Tales Of A Cursed G	Another Day	Shaggy 2 Dope
2023	The Lucid	Saddle Up and Ride	Saddle Up and Ride	Violent J
2023	The Lucid	Saddle Up and Ride	Sweet Toof	Violent J
2024	Ouija Macc & Darby O'Trill	Anemoia	The Trees Have Eyes	Violent J
2024	Merkules	Non-Album Single	SWISH!	
2025	Tierre Diaz	Maniflex	Trending Topics	
2025	Ouija Macc	Sunken Church	Chinchilla	

== Original contributions to compilations ==
Year	Tracks	Album	Other contributing artists	Performed As	Members Of ICP
1998	"Oddities"	WWF The Music, Vol. 3			Insane Clown Posse
1999	"Take It"	WCW Mayhem: The Music			Insane Clown Posse
2000	"The Dirt Ball"	Psychopathics from Outer Space	Twiztid		Insane Clown Posse
2000	"$50 Bucks"	Psychopathics from Outer Space			Insane Clown Posse
2000	"Sleep Walker"	Psychopathics from Outer Space			Violent J
2000	R-U-A Ryda?	Psychopathics from Outer Space	Twiztid, Blaze Ya Dead Homie & Myzery	Psychopathic Rydas	Insane Clown Posse
2000	"Slim Anus"	Psychopathics from Outer Space	Jamie Madrox		Insane Clown Posse
2000	"Dead End"	Psychopathics from Outer Space	Ice-T		Insane Clown Posse
2000	"Red Neck Hoe '99"	Psychopathics from Outer Space	Twiztid		Insane Clown Posse
2000	"The Amazing Maze"	Psychopathics from Outer Space			Violent J
2000	Who?	Psychopathics from Outer Space	Twiztid, Blaze Ya Dead Homie & Myzery	Psychopathic Rydas	Insane Clown Posse
2000	"Meat Cleaver"	Psychopathics from Outer Space	Twiztid & Myzery		Insane Clown Posse
2000	"C*nt Killer"	Race Riot	Esham		Violent J
2000	"Posse on Broadway"	Take a Bite Outta Rhyme: A Rock Tribute to Rap			Violent J
2003	Conquer	Psychopathics from Outer Space 2	Esham & Anybody Killa		Violent J
2003	"Out There"	Psychopathics from Outer Space 2	Bushwick Bill		Insane Clown Posse
2003	"Demon Faces"	Psychopathics from Outer Space 2	Twiztid, Esham & Anybody Killa		Insane Clown Posse
2003	Some Fuckin' How	Psychopathics from Outer Space 2			Violent J
2003	24's On An 84	Psychopathics from Outer Space 2	Esham & T-N-T		Shaggy 2 Dope
2003	Mr. Sesame Seed	Psychopathics from Outer Space 2	Anybody Killa		Violent J
2003	Do It!	Psychopathics from Outer Space 2			Shaggy 2 Dope
2003	"Wicked Wild"	Psychopathics from Outer Space 2	2 Live Crew & Esham		Insane Clown Posse
2003	"Under the Big Top"	Psychopathics from Outer Space 2			Insane Clown Posse
2003	Graverobbers	Psychopathics from Outer Space 2	Twiztid, Blaze Ya Dead Homie & Anybody Killa	Dark Lotus	Insane Clown Posse
2003	Free Studio	Psychopathics from Outer Space 2	Twiztid, Blaze Ya Dead Homie, Anybody Killa, Esham		Insane Clown Posse
2006	"Like It Like That"	Evil Bong (soundtrack)			Insane Clown Posse
2007	"Further Away"	Psychopathics from Outer Space 3	Twiztid & Blaze Ya Dead Homie	Dark Lotus	Insane Clown Posse
2007	"Truth Dare"	Psychopathics from Outer Space 3			Insane Clown Posse
2007	"Put It Down"	Psychopathics from Outer Space 3	Blaze Ya Dead Homie & Jamie Madrox		Violent J
2007	"Last Day Alive"	Psychopathics from Outer Space 3	Boondox & Monoxide Child		Shaggy 2 Dope
2007	"If I Was God"	Psychopathics from Outer Space 3			Violent J
2007	"Hatchet Man"	Psychopathics from Outer Space 3	Twiztid, Blaze Ya Dead Homie		Insane Clown Posse
2008	Frankenstein	Let 'Em Bleed: The Mixxtape, Vol. 1			Violent J
2008	Fall Apart (Remix)	Let 'Em Bleed: The Mixxtape, Vol. 1			Shaggy 2 Dope
2008	Global Warming	Let 'Em Bleed: The Mixxtape, Vol. 1			Violent J
2008	"Global Warming"	The Butcher Shop			Insane Clown Posse
2008	Knee Crackaz	Let 'Em Bleed: The Mixxtape, Vol. 2			Shaggy 2 Dope
2008	In Love With A Hooker	Let 'Em Bleed: The Mixxtape, Vol. 2	Esham		Violent J
2008	Filthy	Let 'Em Bleed: The Mixxtape, Vol. 2			Shaggy 2 Dope
2008	4Ever Detroit	Let 'Em Bleed: The Mixxtape, Vol. 2	Blaze Ya Dead Homie & Awesome Dre		Violent J
2008	Dead Man Walking	Let 'Em Bleed: The Mixxtape, Vol. 2			Violent J
2008	Duke Of The Wicked	Let 'Em Bleed: The Mixxtape, Vol. 3			Violent J
2008	Can't Hold Me Back '08	Let 'Em Bleed: The Mixxtape, Vol. 3	Esham, Big Herk, Awesome Dre & Merciless Amir		Shaggy 2 Dope
2008	Can't Fuck With Us	Let 'Em Bleed: The Mixxtape, Vol. 3			Shaggy 2 Dope
2008	Kept Grindin'	Let 'Em Bleed: The Mixxtape, Vol. 3	Twiztid, Blaze Ya Dead Homie, Anybody Killa, Axe Murder Boyz, Boondox & DJ Clay		Insane Clown Posse
2009	I Shot A Hater	Let 'Em Bleed: The Mixxtape, Vol. 4	Twiztid & Three 6 Mafia		Insane Clown Posse
2010	The Opener	Book of the Wicked, Chapter One			Violent J
2010	Soopa Ninja	Book of the Wicked, Chapter One			Violent J
2010	Whoop!	Book of the Wicked, Chapter One	Axe Murder Boyz & DJ Clay		Insane Clown Posse
2010	I Live My Life On Stage	Book of the Wicked, Chapter One			Shaggy 2 Dope
2010	Down With The Wicked Shit	Book of the Wicked, Chapter Two	Blaze Ya Dead Homie		Shaggy 2 Dope
2010	Fuck The Radio	Book of the Wicked, Chapter Two	Bonez Dubb		Violent J
2010	Hey Hoe	Book of the Wicked, Chapter Two	Otis		Violent J
2010	Who Is It?	Book of the Wicked, Chapter Two			Insane Clown Posse
2013	Goblin	A World Upside Down: The Mixxtape			Insane Clown Posse
2013	When I'm Clownin' (CeeMix)	A World Upside Down: The Mixxtape	Kreayshawn		Insane Clown Posse
2013	Officer Hatchet	A World Upside Down: The Mixxtape			Violent J
2013	SKREEEM! (Joe Strange Remix)	A World Upside Down: The Mixxtape	Hopsin & Tech N9ne		Insane Clown Posse

== Videography ==
=== Video albums ===
- Shockumentary (1997, 1998 VHS, 2004 DVD) RIAA: Platinum
- Bootlegged in L.A. (2003 DVD) RIAA: Gold
- Psychopathic: The Videos (2007 DVD)
- Hatchet Attacks: Live From Red Rocks (2008 DVD)
- A Family Underground (2009 DVD)
- American Psycho Tour Documentary (2012 DVD)
- The Riddle Box Weekend (2013 2xDVD)
- Psychopathic: The Videos Volume 2 (2014 2xDVD)
- 2012 New Years Eve Ninja Party (2015 DVD)
- Bootlegged In Detroit (2020 DVD)
- Historical Tours (2021 DVD)

=== Films ===
- Big Money Hustlas (2000 VHS/DVD) RIAA: Platinum
- Bowling Balls (2004 DVD)
- Chronicles of the Dark Carnival (2006 TV, 2013 DVD, 2016 Ltd. Ed. DVD)
- Death Racers (2008 DVD)
- Big Money Rustlas (2010 DVD, 2015 DVD)

=== Appearances ===
- Backstage Sluts (1999 VHS)
- Backstage Pass (1999 VHS/DVD)
- Born Twiztid: Beyond the Freakshow (2000 VHS/DVD)

=== Wrestling ===
- ICP's Strangle-Mania (1995)
- ECW Hardcore Heaven (1997)
- WWF Summerslam (1998)
- Strangle Mania 2 (1999)
- WCW Road Wild (1999)
- WCW Fall Brawl (1999)
- JCW, Volume 1 (2000)
- JCW, Volume 2 (2001)
- XPW Redemption (2001)
- JCW, Volume 3 (2003)
- JCW: SlamTV – Episodes 1 thru 9 (2007)
- JCW: SlamTV – Episodes 10 thru 15 featuring Bloodymania (2007)

== Music videos ==
=== As lead artist ===
Year	Title	Director(s)	Album	Artist	Role
1994	Chicken Huntin'		Ringmaster	Insane Clown Posse	Main Performers
1995	Chicken Huntin' (Slaughter House Mix)	Paris Mayhew	Riddle Box	Insane Clown Posse	Main Performers
1997	Halls of Illusions	Kevin Kerslake	The Great Milenko	Insane Clown Posse	Main Performers
1998	Hokus Pokus	Steven Hanft	The Great Milenko	Insane Clown Posse	Main Performers
1998	How Many Times		The Great Milenko	Insane Clown Posse	Main Performers
1998	Piggie Pie		The Great Milenko	Insane Clown Posse	Main Performers
1999	Another Love Song		The Amazing Jeckel Brothers	Insane Clown Posse	Main Performers
2000				Insane Clown Posse	Main Performers
2000	Let's Go All the Way		Bizzar	Insane Clown Posse	Main Performers
2000	Tilt-A-Whirl		Bizaar	Insane Clown Posse	Main Performers
2000	We Don't Die		Freek Show	Twiztid	Cameo
2002	Homies (w/Twiztid)	Paul Andresen	The Wraith: Shangri-La	Insane Clown Posse	Main Performers
2004	Bowling Balls	Paul Andresen	The Wraith: Hell's Pit	Insane Clown Posse	Main Performers
2004	Real Underground Baby	Ryan Hernandez	The Wraith: Hell's Pit	Insane Clown Posse	Main Performers
2005	The People		Forgotten Freshness Volume 4	Insane Clown Posse	Main Performers
2006	Blood Redrum		Hallowicked 2006	Insane Clown Posse	Main Performers
2007	Evil is Afraid		Hallowicked 2007	Insane Clown Posse	Main Performers
2008	The Tower		The Tempest	Insane Clown Posse	Main Performers
2009	In Yo Face	Paul Andresen	Bang! Pow! Boom!	Insane Clown Posse	Main Performers
2010	Miracles	Paul Andresen	Bang! Pow! Boom!	Insane Clown Posse	Main Performers
2010	Juggalo Island	Paul Andresen	Bang! Pow! Boom!	Insane Clown Posse	Main Performers
2010	Fonz Pond	Paul Andresen	Bang! Pow! Boom!	Insane Clown Posse	Main Performers
2011	It's All Over	Paul Andresen	Bang! Pow! Boom!	Insane Clown Posse	Main Performers
2012
2012	Chris Benoit	The Deka Brothers	The Mighty Death Pop!	Insane Clown Posse	Main Performers
2012	Night of The Chainsaw	Roy Knyrim	The Mighty Death Pop!	Insane Clown Posse	Main Performers
2012	Dub Sack		Gang Rags	Blaze Ya Dead Homie	Cameo
2013
2013	Jump Around	Brian Kuma	Smothered, Covered & Chunked	Insane Clown Posse	Main Performers
2013	Hate Her To Death	The Deka Brothers	The Mighty Death Pop!	Insane Clown Posse	Main Performers
2013	Where's God?	Douglas Schulze	The Mighty Death Pop!	Insane Clown Posse	Main Performers
2013	When I'm Clownin' (Danny Brown Remix) (w/Boondox & Danny Brown)	Brian Kuma	The Mighty Death Pop!	Insane Clown Posse	Main Performers
2014	Might Go Mad		The Garcia Brothers	Axe Murder Boyz	Featured Performers
2014	Forever	Unknown	The Mighty Death Pop!	Insane Clown Posse	Main Performers
2014	The Mighty Death Pop	Unknown	The Mighty Death Pop!	Insane Clown Posse	Main Performers
2014	The Kreayshawn Song	Unknown	Forgotten Freshness Volume 5	Insane Clown Posse	Main Performers
2014	Beautiful Doom	Unknown	Bang! Pow! Boom!	Insane Clown Posse	Main Performers
2014	Red Moon Howl	Official fan made video	Hallowicked 2014	Insane Clown Posse	Main Performers
2015	Explosions	Unknown	The Marvelous Missing Link: Lost	Insane Clown Posse	Main Performers
2016	Falling Apart	Brain Archibald	The Marvelous Missing Link: Lost	Insane Clown Posse	Main Performers
2016	I See The Devil		The Marvelous Missing Link: Lost	Insane Clown Posse	Main Performers
2017	Beautiful (Indestructible)	Unknown	Covered, Smothered & Chunked	Insane Clown Posse	Main Performers
2017	4 Life	Unknown	Non-album video	Insane Clown Posse	Main Performers
2017	7 Foot 8 Foot (w/Lyte)	Brian Archibald	Non-album video	Insane Clown Posse	Main Performers
2017	Fuck My Dad (Richard Bruce) Jumpsteady & Shaggy 2 Dope)	Brian Kuma	Non-album video	Insane Clown Posse	Main Performers
2017	FTTBBR	Unknown	Psychopathic Monstar EP	Lyte	Featured Performers
2018	Fury	Unknown	Fearless Fred Fury	Insane Clown Posse	Main Performers
2018	Satellite	Unknown	Fearless Fred Fury	Insane Clown Posse	Main Performers
2019	Nobody's Fault	Unknown	Fearless Fred Fury	Insane Clown Posse	Main Performers
2021	Wretched	DEADBUG	Yum Yum Bedlam		

=== Solo music videos ===
Year	Title	Director(s)	Album	Artist
May 8, 2009	Jealousy		The Shining	Violent J
May 25, 2017	Tell These Bitches		F.T.F.O.M.F.	Shaggy 2 Dope
February 9, 2018	The Knife		F.T.F.O.M.F.	Shaggy 2 Dope

=== Group music videos ===
Year	Title	Director(s)	Album	Artist
2007	"Duk Da Fuk Down"		Duk Da Fuk Down	Psychopathic Rydas
2014	"Surprize"		Reindeer Games	The Killjoy Club

=== Psypher music videos ===
Year	Title	Producer	Director(s)	Location	Artists
2011	Psypher 1	DJ Clay		Record Time (Roseville, MI)	Violent J, Anybody Killa, Jamie Madrox & Bootleg
2011	Psypher 2	DJ Clay		St. Andrews Hall (Detroit, MI)	Shaggy 2 Dope, Blaze Ya Dead Homie, Monoxide Child, Boondox & Shoestring
2011	Psypher 3	DJ Clay	Brian Kuma	The Fillmore (Detroit, MI)	Insane Clown Posse, Twiztid, Drive-By & Cold 187um
2012	Psypher 4	DJ Clay		Zug Island	Insane Clown Posse, Twiztid, Drive-By, Cold 187um & The R.O.C.
2017	Psypher 5 (If We Were A Gang)	DJ Carlito			Insane Clown Posse, Anybody Killa, DJ Clay, Big Hoodoo, Blahzay Roze & Lyte
2017	Psypher 6 (Juggalo Love)	Seven		Columbus, OH	Insane Clown Posse, Big Hoodoo, Lyte & Ouija Macc (1st The Loony Goons song)
2019	Psypher 8 (8 ways to die)	Psychopathic Records, Rotten Cake	Jason Shaltz		Insane Clown Posse, DJ Paul, Stitches, Esham, Mac Lethal, Ouija Macc, Cage
