= The Calm (EP) =

EP by Insane Clown Posse
- Released: May 17, 2005
- Studio: The Lotus Pod (Detroit, MI)
- Genre: Horrorcore
- Length: 27:23
- Label: Psychopathic Records
- Producer: Insane Clown Posse

Insane Clown Posse chronology
Dark Carnival Action Figures (2000)	The Calm (2005)	Eye of the Storm (2007)

Professional ratings
Review scores
Source	Rating
AllMusic	3/5 stars

The Calm is the eleventh extended play by American hip hop duo Insane Clown Posse. It was released on May 17, 2005, via Psychopathic Records. Recording sessions took place at the Lotus Pod in Detroit. Production was handled entirely by ICP themselves. It features the lone guest appearance from Esham. The EP peaked at number 32 on the Billboard 200, number five on the Top Rap Albums and topped the Independent Albums in the United States.

The album's title refers to the popular phrase "the calm before the storm". According to Violent J, the EP serves as "a prelude to The Tempest, this was only the beginning of the end, the coming storm". On the cover art, the crop circles make up the letters "ICP" in a logo adopted by the group since the end of the first Deck of the Dark Carnival saga. Several tracks on the album make references to crop circles.

== Track listing ==
All tracks are written by Joseph Bruce and Joseph Utsler.

No.	Title	Length
1.	"Intro"	1:30
2.	"Rollin' Over"	3:42
3.	"Rosemary"	3:40
4.	"Crop Circles"	3:49
5.	"Deadbeat Moms" (featuring Esham)	3:07
6.	"We'll Be Alright"	4:37
7.	"Like It Like That"	3:02
8.	"Off the Track"	3:56
Total length:		27:23

== Personnel ==
- Joseph "Violent J" Bruce – songwriter, vocals, programming, producer, engineering, recording, mixing
- Joseph "Shaggy 2 Dope" Utsler – songwriter, vocals, programming, producer, engineering, recording, mixing
- Esham Smith – vocals (track 5)
- Fritz "The Cat" Van Kosky – additional mixing
- Brian Debler – graphic design

== Charts ==
Chart (2005)	Peak position
US Billboard 200	32
US Top Rap Albums (Billboard)	5
US Independent Albums (Billboard)	1
