= Jugganauts: The Best of Insane Clown Posse =

Jugganauts

Greatest hits album by Insane Clown Posse
- Released: October 30, 2007
- Recorded: 1996–2000
- Genres: Hip hop, horrorcore
- Length: 1:15:26
- Label: Island
- Producer: Mike E. Clark

Insane Clown Posse chronology
Eye of the Storm (2007)	Jugganauts (2007)	Bang! Pow! Boom! (2009)

Professional ratings
Review scores
Source	Rating
AllMusic	3.5/5 stars

Jugganauts: The Best of Insane Clown Posse is the ninth compilation album by American hip hop group Insane Clown Posse. Released by Island Records, the album contains songs from 1997 to 2000, from the albums The Great Milenko, The Amazing Jeckel Brothers, Bizzar and Bizaar. It is the group's 25th overall release.

All tracks are digitally remastered by Gavin Lurssen.

== Track listing ==
No.	Title	Length
1.	"The Great Milenko"	1:56
2.	"Hokus Pokus"	4:26
3.	"Piggy Pie (Old School)"	4:22
4.	"The Neden Game"	4:01
5.	"Halls of Illusions" (featuring Slash)	4:17
6.	"Mad Professor"	5:50
7.	"Boogie Woogie Wu"	4:25
8.	"Cherry Pie (I Need a Freak)"	4:32
9.	"Another Love Song"	4:12
10.	"Rainbows & Stuff"	4:11
11.	"I Want My Shit"	5:20
12.	"Fuck the World"	3:42
13.	"Bitches" (featuring Ol' Dirty Bastard)	4:33
14.	"My Axe"	3:53
15.	"Tilt-A-Whirl"	3:57
16.	"Please Don't Hate Me"	4:17
17.	"Let's Go All the Way"	3:34
18.	"What Is a Juggalo?"	3:58
Total length:		1:15:26

== Charts ==
Chart (2007)	Peak position
US Billboard 200	124
US Top Rap Albums (Billboard)	23
US Top Hard Rock Albums (Billboard)	19
