= Let 'Em Bleed: The Mixxtape, Vol. 3 =

Mixtape by DJ Clay
- Released: November 11, 2008
- Recorded: 2008
- Genre: Hip hop
- Length: 56:08
- Label: Hatchet House
- Producer: DJ Clay

DJ Clay chronology
Let 'Em Bleed: The Mixxtape, Vol. 2 (2008)	Let 'Em Bleed: The Mixxtape, Vol. 3 (2008)	Let 'Em Bleed: The Mixxtape, Vol. 4 (2009)

Let 'Em Bleed: The Mixxtape, Vol. 3 is a mixtape by DJ Clay. Released in 2008, it is the third installment of a three-per-year series of mixtapes which contain brand new and remixed songs from artists from the Psychopathic Records and Hatchet House roster. The song "Can't Hold Me Back '08" was created in honor of the 20th anniversary of the original Awesome Dre version, and features some of the biggest Detroit rappers of then and now.

== Track listing ==
#	Title	Performer(s)	Producer(s)
1	"Opening"	DJ Clay	DJ Clay; Eric Davie
2	"Ima Get Mine"	AMB; DJ Clay	Otis (of Axe Murder Boyz)
3	"They Shootin" (Rock Mixx)	Shaggy 2 Dope	DJ Clay; Razor Ray
4	"Let's Ride"	Tech N9ne; DJ Clay	DJ Clay
5	"Walk Away"	ABK	Tre Pound
6	"Rare Never Heard Before Milenko Skit"	Insane Clown Posse	
7	"Touch of Death" (remix)	Blaze	DJ Clay; Eric Davie; Willie E
8	"Fuck the Devil"	AMB	DJ Clay
9	"Duke of the Wicked"	Violent J	Big Larkwood
10	"Get Paid"	Jamie Madrox; Bailz	DJ Clay
11	"Another Love Song"	Boondox	Eric Davie; Akuma; J.Russin; M.Fortunate; Nathan Xtra
12	"Can't Hold Me Back '08"	Awesome Dre; Big Herk; Esham; Merciless Amir; Shaggy 2 Dope (credited as ICP); Boss	Akuma
13	"Can't Fuck Wit Us"	Shaggy 2 Dope	Tre Pound
14	"You're the Reason" (remix)	Twiztid	Eric Davie; DJ Clay
15	"Keys 2 Life"	DJ Clay	Jaywan
16	"Kept Grindin"	The Entire Hatchet Family	Jaywan
17	"Closer"	DJ Clay	DJ Clay; Eric Davie

== Charts ==
Chart (2008)	Peak position
US Top Heatseekers	10
