= Let 'Em Bleed: The Mixxtape, Vol. 2 =

Mixtape by DJ Clay
- Released: July 8, 2008
- Recorded: 2007–2008
- Genre: Hardcore hip hop, Midwest hip hop
- Length: 49:53
- Label: Hatchet House
- Producer: DJ Clay

DJ Clay chronology
Let 'Em Bleed: The Mixxtape, Vol. 1 (2008)	Let 'Em Bleed: The Mixxtape, Vol. 2 (2008)	Let 'Em Bleed: The Mixxtape, Vol. 3 (2008)

Let 'Em Bleed: The Mixxtape, Vol. 2 is a mixtape by DJ Clay. Released in 2008, it is the second installment of a four-part series of mixtapes which contain brand new and remixed songs from artists from the Psychopathic Records and Hatchet House roster. This volume also features a solo song by Bizarre of D12, an artist not signed to Psychopathic Records or Hatchet House. A third volume was released on November 11, 2008.

== Track listing ==
#	Title	Time	Performer(s)	Producer(s)
1	Intro	2:08	DJ Clay	DJ Clay
2	Snake Bite	2:37	Boondox	Akuma
3	Knee Crakaz	2:04	Shaggy 2 Dope	Tre Pound
4	Get 'Em All	2:32	DJ Clay; Jamie Madrox	DJ Clay
5	Karma [Rock Mix]	3:57	Twiztid	DJ Clay; Razor Ray; 2 Def
6	They Know	3:37	Boondox	Akuma
7	In Love With A Hooker	3:12	Violent J Esham	Eric Davie
8	Filthy	2:11	Shaggy 2 Dope	Tre Pound
9	Rollin' Over [Rock Mix]	3:02	Insane Clown Posse	DJ Clay; Razor Ray; 2 Def
10	Juggalo	3:14	Bizarre	Tre Pound
11	My Life	3:06	DJ Clay	Dub Musik
12	So Preventable	3:22	Boondox	Akuma
13	Dangerous	3:46	R.O.C. King Gordy	Violent J
14	4Ever Detroit	4:31	Blaze Ya Dead Homie; Violent J Awesome Dre	Tre Pound
15	Birds and Bees	2:15	Twiztid	Eric Davie
16	Dead Man Walking	4:00	Violent J	Violent J
17	Outro	0:15		DJ Clay

== Charts ==
Chart (2008)	Peak position
US Billboard 200	156
US Top Heatseekers	9
US Top Independent Albums	23
US Top Internet Albums	200
