= F.T.F.O.M.F. =

Studio album by Shaggy 2 Dope
- Released: May 26, 2017
- Genre: Rap rock
- Length: 55:07
- Label: Psychopathic
- Producers: DJ Clay; Shaggy 2 Dope

Shaggy 2 Dope chronology
F.T.F.O. (2006)	F.T.F.O.M.F. (2017)	Professor Shaggs and the Quest for the Ultimate Groove (2023)

F.T.F.O.M.F. (an abbreviation for Fuck The Fuck Off Mother Fucker) is the second solo studio album by American rapper Shaggy 2 Dope. It was released in 2017 through Psychopathic Records. Production was handled by DJ Clay and Shaggy 2 Dope himself. It features the lone guest appearance from Violent J. The album debuted at No. 72 on the US Billboard 200, No. 39 on the Top R&B/Hip-Hop Albums, No. 18 on the Top Album Sales and topped the Independent Albums chart.

A music video for "Tell These Bitches" was published the day before the album release, while the music video for "The Knife" was released on February 10, 2018. The song "Psychopathic Soldier" is a diss track aimed at Majik Ninja Entertainment.

== Tour ==
Shaggy 2 Dope (accompanied by Ouija Macc) embarked on a US concert tour, F.T.F.O.M.F. Tour, in support of the album. The first show took place on December 31, 2018 at the Foundry Concert Club in Lakewood, OH, and ended on February 16, 2019, at House of Blues in New Orleans, Louisiana. Also on this tour, the rapper's second extended play Gloomy Sunday was available for purchase.

== Track listing ==
All lyrics are written by Joseph Utsler, except for track 8 written with Joseph Bruce; all music is composed by DJ Clay and Shaggy 2 Dope.

F.T.F.O.M.F. track listing
No.	Title	Length
1.	"Intro"	0:39
2.	"Tell These Bitches"	4:00
3.	"F.T.F.O.M.F."	3:17
4.	"Too Dope"	4:21
5.	"The Knife"	2:47
6.	"Tonight I'm Yours"	4:02
7.	"Dickhead"	3:03
8.	"Foggin' Up the Window" (featuring Violent J)	4:54
9.	"Stretch Nuts: A Legend Was Born"	3:16
10.	"Electric Kool-Aid"	4:28
11.	"Don't Ask Me"	3:49
12.	"Celebrate"	3:47
13.	"Seven Deadliest"	4:06
14.	"Psychopathic Soldier"	3:47
15.	"Revolution 17" (Outro)	4:51
Total length:		55:07

2×LP and digital bonus track
No.	Title	Length
16.	"Aww Shit" (featuring DJ Clay)	3:03
Total length:		58:10

== Personnel ==
- Joseph "Shaggy 2 Dope" Utsler – lyrics, vocals, producer, arranger
- Joseph "Violent J" Bruce – lyrics & vocals (track 8)
- Michael "DJ Clay" Velasquez – producer, arranger, recording, mixing
- Jim Kissling – mastering
- Domaine – additional engineering
- Nicky the Beard – additional engineering
- Little Jimmy G – additional engineering
- Matt Fenner – design
- Gary Alford – artwork
- Intro - Str8Jaket, Mean Dean.

== Charts ==
Chart performance for F.T.F.O.M.F.
Chart (2017)	Peak position
US Billboard 200	72
US Top R&B/Hip-Hop Albums (Billboard)	39
US Independent Albums (Billboard)	1

== Release history ==
Release dates and formats for F.T.F.O.M.F
Region	Date	Format	Edition	Label
United States	May 26, 2017	CD	Standard	Psychopathic
United States	May 26, 2017	Digital download	+ Bonus track	Psychopathic
United States	May 26, 2017	LP	Standard	Psychopathic
United States	May 26, 2017	2×LP	+ Bonus track	Psychopathic
