= Let 'Em Bleed: The Mixxtape, Vol. 1 =

Mixtape by DJ Clay
- Released: February 19, 2008
- Recorded: 2007
- Genre: Hardcore hip hop, Midwest hip hop, underground hip hop
- Length: 46:48
- Label: Hatchet House
- Producer: DJ Clay

DJ Clay chronology
| Let 'Em Bleed: The Mixxtape, Vol. 1 (2008) | Let 'Em Bleed: The Mixxtape, Vol. 2 (2008) |

Let 'Em Bleed: The Mixxtape, Vol. 1 is a mixtape by DJ Clay. Released in 2008, it is the first installment of a four cd series of mixtapes which contain brand new and remixed songs from artists from the Psychopathic Records and Hatchet House roster.

== Track listing ==
| # | Title | Time | Performer(s) | Producer(s) | Additional Information |
|---|---|---|---|---|---|
| 1 | Start | 1:46 | DJ Clay | DJ Clay | |
| 2 | Follow Me | 3:47 | DJ Clay | DJ Clay | Additional guitar by Razor Ray |
| 3 | Let 'Em Know | 2:12 | Jamie Madrox | DJ Clay | |
| 4 | Alley Rat [Remix] | 2:23 | Insane Clown Posse | DJ Clay | |
| 5 | Frankenstein | 2:47 | Violent J | Violent J | |
| 6 | I Murder | 4:37 | Boondox; Esham | Seven | |
| 7 | Sickness | 2:52 | Twiztid; Blaze Ya Dead Homie | Eric Davie | |
| 8 | Fall Apart | 2:59 | Shaggy 2 Dope | Twiztid | Additional vocals by Shante McClure |
| 9 | Somethin' Outta Horror Flick | 2:03 | Jamie Madrox; R.O.C. | DJ Clay | |
| 10 | Diemuthafuckadie! | 2:22 | R.O.C. | Twiztid; Scott Summers | |
| 11 | Get Ya Wicked On [Remix] | 2:29 | Insane Clown Posse | Shaggy 2 Dope | |
| 12 | Off the Post | 2:38 | Boondox | Akuma | |
| 13 | Blaze & Monoxide | 1:36 | Blaze; Monoxide | Violent J | |
| 14 | Write A Letter | 1:20 | Jamie Madrox | Jamie Madrox; DJ Clay | |
| 15 | Kill 4 You | 2:45 | DJ Clay; Bailz | Lost Koast Productions | |
| 16 | Trife | 3:08 | DJ Clay | Tre Pound | Additional vocals by Young Hood |
| 17 | Global Warming | 4:14 | Violent J | Eric Davie | |
| 18 | End | 0:50 | DJ Clay | DJ Clay | |

== Charts ==
| Chart (2008) | Peak position |
|---|---|
| US Top Heatseekers | 19 |
| US Top Independent Albums | 48 |
