= Psychopathics from Outer Space 2 =

Psychopathics from Outer Space Part 2

Compilation album by Psychopathic artists
- Released: December 18, 2003
- Recorded: The Lotus Pod
- Genre: Hardcore hip hop, horrorcore, underground hip hop
- Length: 78:37
- Label: Psychopathic Records
- Producer: Mike Puwal, Fritz the Cat, Esham

Psychopathic artists chronology
Psychopathics from Outer Space (2000)	Psychopathics from Outer Space Part 2 (2003)	Psychopathics from Outer Space Part 3 (2007)

Professional ratings
Review scores
Source	Rating
AllMusic	3/5 stars

Psychopathics from Outer Space Part 2 is a 2003 compilation album featuring rare and previously unreleased material by Psychopathic Records artists, including Insane Clown Posse, Twiztid, Anybody Killa, Blaze Ya Dead Homie, Esham, Jumpsteady, and Zug Izland. Guest appearances are made by Bushwick Bill, TNT, Fresh Kid Ice, and Fish & Grits.

== Overview ==
This is the only PFOS album that features Esham, who left Psychopathic after releasing three albums, Zug Izland, who left Psychopathic after releasing two albums, Anybody Killa, who left Psychopathic but rejoined later, and Jumpsteady, who retired from music after releasing two albums.

== Track listing ==
No.	Title	Producers(s)	Length
1.	"Intro"		0:13
2.	"Conquer" (performed by Violent J, Esham, & Anybody Killa)	Mike P. & Violent J	3:47
3.	"Hollywood, I'm Coming" (performed by Twiztid)	Systasyrosis Soundsquad	2:47
4.	"Oldie But Goodie" (performed by Esham)	Esham	3:19
5.	"Warrior" (performed by Anybody Killa)	Fritz the Cat & Violent J	3:57
6.	"10 Bodies" (performed by Blaze Ya Dead Homie)	Mike P.	3:37
7.	"Out There" (performed by the Insane Clown Posse & Bushwick Bill)	Mike P. & Insane Clown Posse	3:31
8.	"Y?" (performed by Zug Izland)	Zug Izland	2:53
9.	"Demon Faces" (performed by the Insane Clown Posse, Twiztid, Anybody Killa & Esham)	Mike P., Insane Clown Posse & Esham	2:54
10.	"True Stories" (performed by Jumpsteady)	Mike P.	3:02
11.	"Some Fuckin' How" (performed by Violent J)	Mike P.	3:11
12.	"24's on a '84" (performed by Esham, Shaggy 2 Dope & TNT)	Mike P. & Esham	3:23
13.	"Mr. Sesame Seed" (performed by Violent J & Anybody Killa)	Mike P. & Violent J	4:21
14.	"Do It!" (performed by Shaggy 2 Dope)	Mike P. & Shaggy 2 Dope	2:21
15.	"Yuwannahoe" (performed by Twiztid)	Systasyrosis Soundsquad	3:54
16.	"Wicked Wild" (performed by the Insane Clown Posse, Esham, Fresh Kid Ice and Fish & Grits)	Esham, Insane Clown Posse, Fresh Kid Ice and Fish & Grits	5:24
17.	"We Live" (performed by Zug Izland)	Zug Izland	3:29
18.	"Bitch Shut Up" (performed by Blaze Ya Dead Homie & Esham)	Mike P.	3:49
19.	"Under the Big Top" (performed by Insane Clown Posse)	Mike P. & Insane Clown Posse	3:00
20.	"Stayin' Alive" (performed by Anybody Killa)	Fritz the Cat & Violent J	3:35
21.	"Killin' Spree" (performed by Esham)	Esham	2:57
22.	"Graverobbers" (performed by Dark Lotus)	Fritz the Cat & Dark Lotus	4:11
23.	"Free Studio" (performed by The Entire Hatchet Family)	Mike P.	4:53
Total length:			78:37
