= Charges of Indictment =

Studio album by The Dayton Family
- Released: June 21, 2011
- Genre: Midwest hip hop; gangsta rap; underground hip hop; horrorcore
- Length: 1:04:31
- Label: Hatchet House; Psychopathic
- Producer: Mike E. Clark, Bernard Terry, DJ Paul, KLC, Mr. Porter. mixed by Chuck Alkazian @Pearl Sound Studios, Canton MI

The Dayton Family chronology
The Return: The Right to Remain Silent (2009)	Charges of Indictment (2011)

Singles from Charges of Indictment
- 1. "Cocaine" Released: March 28, 2011

Charges of Indictment is the seventh studio album by American hip-hop group The Dayton Family. It was released on June 21, 2011 via Hatchet House/Psychopathic Records, making it the group's first full-length release on the label, and their second album since 1994's What's on My Mind? to feature the three original core members, Bootleg, Shoestring and Backstabber, following 2009's The Return: The Right to Remain Silent. The album features guest appearances from Dink Sosa, Flex of Top Authority, Gucci Mane, Insane Clown Posse, Philly Cocaine and Twiztid.

The lyrical themes of the album derive from horrorcore and gangsta rap, focusing on subject matter which includes murder, crime and drug use.

Reaching a peak position of number 75 on the US Billboard Top R&B/Hip-Hop Albums, the album remained on the chart for a week.

== Reception ==
Professional ratings
Review scores
Source	Rating
AllMusic	3.5/5 stars

David Jeffries of AllMusic gave the album 3.5 out of 5 stars, writing "Charges of Indictment is a Dayton Family album in the classic Flint style, although only their loyal, proudly lecherous following would think of it as such". Spin ranked Charges of Indictment as the 25th best rap album of 2011.

== Track listing ==
No.	Title	Length
1.	"Intro"	0:39
2.	"When the Feds Come Run'n"	3:25
3.	"Blood on My Knife"	3:33
4.	"Prostitute Killa" (featuring Flex of Top Authority)	4:20
5.	"Bill Collector"	3:11
6.	"Psycho"	4:09
7.	"War Time"	3:25
8.	"Live My Life"	4:50
9.	"Kill" (featuring Twiztid)	3:28
10.	"Quit Snitch'n" (featuring Dink Sosa)	4:06
11.	"I'm Ill"	3:54
12.	"Cocaine" (featuring Philly Cocaine)	5:07
13.	"Pill Pop'n" (featuring Gucci Mane)	3:59
14.	"Sunshine"	3:48
15.	"Murder City"	3:28
16.	"The Gathering" (featuring Insane Clown Posse)	4:52
17.	"Yall Niggas Know Not to Fuck with Us"	4:17
Total length:		1:04:31

== Chart history ==
Chart (2011)	Peak position
US Top R&B/Hip-Hop Albums (Billboard)	75
