= Psychopathics from Outer Space =

Compilation album by Insane Clown Posse & Twiztid
- Released: September 30, 2000
- Recorded: Various dates
- Length: 70:03
- Labels: Joe & Joey

Psychopathic Records chronology
Psychopathics from Outer Space (2000)	Psychopathics from Outer Space Part 2 (2003)

Insane Clown Posse chronology
Forgotten Freshness Volumes 1 & 2 (1998)	Psychopathics from Outer Space (2000)	Forgotten Freshness Volume 3 (2001)

Twiztid chronology
Psychopathics from Outer Space (2000)	Cryptic Collection (2000)

Professional ratings
Review scores
Source	Rating
Allmusic	2/5 stars

Psychopathics from Outer Space is a compilation album featuring Insane Clown Posse, Twiztid, Blaze Ya Dead Homie, Psychopathic Rydas, Ice-T, and Myzery. Released on September 30, 2000, on Joe & Joey Records, the album is a collection of outtakes and unreleased tracks.

== Overview ==
"The Dirt Ball" was featured in the film Heavy Metal 2000. "Slim Anus" is a diss track towards Eminem. "Dead End", featuring a guest appearance by Ice-T, was originally intended for The Amazing Jeckel Brothers.

Many of Twiztid's contributions appeared on the original version of Mostasteless. The Psychopathic Rydas tracks were omitted from the album when it was issued on iTunes and Amazon MP3 by Psychopathic Records.

== Track listing ==
No.	Title	Performer (s)	Length
1.	"The Dirt Ball"	ICP; Twiztid	5:25
2.	"Murder, Murder, Murder"	Twiztid	3:23
3.	"$50 Bucks"	ICP	4:10
4.	"Blam!"	Twiztid	5:32
5.	"Sleep Walker"	ICP	5:53
6.	"R-U-A Ryda?"	Psychopathic Rydas (ICP/Twiztid/Blaze/Myzery)	3:41
7.	"She Ain't Afraid"	Twiztid	6:01
8.	"Slim Anus"	ICP; Jamie Madrox	4:24
9.	"Dead End"	ICP; Ice-T	5:24
10.	"Red Neck Hoe '99"	ICP; Twiztid	5:33
11.	"Somebody Dissin' U"	Twiztid	3:29
12.	"The Amazing Maze"	ICP	4:40
13.	"Old School Pervert"	Jamie Madrox	4:32
14.	"Who?"	Psychopathic Rydas (ICP/Twiztid/Blaze)	3:21
15.	"Meat Cleaver"	ICP; Twiztid; Myzery	4:34
Total length:			70:03
