= Furious (album) =

Studio album by Soopa Villainz
- Released: August 16, 2005
- Genre: Hip hop
- Length: 44:14
- Label: Psychopathic Records
- Producer: Soopa Villainz; Polar Bear

Furious is the only studio album by American hip hop supergroup Soopa Villainz. It was released on August 16, 2005, via Psychopathic Records. Production was handled by Soopa Villainz themselves except for the song "Pussy", which was produced by Polar Bear. The album debuted at number 92 on the Billboard 200, number 42 on the Top R&B/Hip-Hop Albums and number 8 on the Top Internet Albums in the United States. The entire full-length is a concept album based upon a story of the 4 members coming from another planet to take over the world.

== Background and recording ==
Originally planned to be recorded and released in 2003, the project was put on hold due to solo releases from Violent J, who was releasing his debut solo extended play Wizard of the Hood, and Esham was preparing to release an album titled Repentance. The project was put on the backburner until 2004 when rumours were debunked at the 2004 Gathering of the Juggalos about name changes and added members like Tech N9ne and Layzie Bone by J and Esham themselves. In late 2004 Lavel was seen onstage with Violent J's brother Jumpsteady's hypeman during a 2005 tour sporting a hatchet man charm. When asked it was revealed that Lavel would be part of the project as well. Recording of the album lasted 4 months and it would turn out to be a true tour-de-force for Esham as he was also working on material for an unreleased solo album titled Club Evil.

AllMusic reviewer described the project as wrote: "sarcastically violent, rhythmically aggressive, and comically excessive, Furious sounds basically like an Insane Clown Posse album that includes an extra pair of voices and drops the horror-movie schtick in favour of a sardonic EC Comics vibe".

== Track listing ==
No.	Title	Length
1.	"Intro"	1:20
2.	"To the Rescue"	2:14
3.	"Furious"	3:14
4.	"Mr. Club"	2:56
5.	"The Van"	3:41
6.	"Guided Missiles"	3:24
7.	"Black Plague"	2:25
8.	"Hostile"	2:45
9.	"List of Demands"	3:49
10.	"Pussy"	3:32
11.	"So What"	3:27
12.	"I Shot the DJ"	3:07
13.	"Hook Up the Cut"	2:38
14.	"Danger"	2:58
15.	"It's Over"	2:44
Total length:		44:14

== Charts ==
Chart (2005)	Peak position
US Billboard 200	92
US Top R&B/Hip-Hop Albums (Billboard)	42
US Independent Albums (Billboard)	9
US Top Internet Albums (Billboard)	8
