= Fuck Off! =

Debut solo release by Shaggy 2 Dope

Single by Shaggy 2 Dope

from the album Shaggs The Clown
- B-side: "I'm Not Alone"
- Released: November 22, 1994
- Studio: Pulsar Sound Studio
- Genre: Hip hop
- Length: 3:26
- Label: Psychopathic
- Songwriter(s): Joseph Utsler; Joseph Bruce
- Producer(s): Mike E. Clark

Fuck Off! is an EP by American rapper Shaggy 2 Dope inspired by the success of "Fuck Off!", the rapper's first solo single. "Fuck Off!", the single, was released on November 22, 1994 through Psychopathic Records. Written by Insane Clown Posse, it was recorded at Pulsar Sound Studio and produced by Mike E. Clark.

Copies of the single sported a cover drawn by Shaggy 2 Dope himself; the same artwork would be used on the Fuck Off! EP's cover.

Copies of the single also contained a booklet with an advertisement for a Shaggy solo LP titled Shaggs The Clown. After sampling problems and numerous delays, however, the album was eventually scrapped.

== Track listing for the single ==
Nut
No.	Title	Length
1.	"Fuck Off!"	3:26

Sac
No.	Title	Length
2.	"I'm Not Alone"	5:03

=== Personnel ===
- Joseph "Shaggy 2 Dope" Utsler – lyrics, vocals, cover art
- Joseph "Violent J" Bruce – lyrics
- Mike E. Clark – programming, engineering, producer

== Fuck Off! EP ==
Fuck Off!

EP by Shaggy 2 Dope
- Released: 1999
- Studio: The Fun House
- Genre: Rap rock
- Length: 19:01
- Label: Psychopathic
- Producer: Mike E. Clark

Shaggy 2 Dope chronology
Fuck Off! (1999)	Gloomy Sunday (2019)

Professional ratings
Review scores
Source	Rating
AllMusic	3.5/5 stars

After the release of the eponymous single, Fuck Off! was repackaged as an extended play in 1994, containing the single's main track and flipside track and two additional tracks. A reissue of the EP was released in late 1999. Another reissue of the EP was released on July 22, 2003, which peaked at No. 42 on the US Billboard Independent Albums chart. The EP was reissued again for a vinyl edition on November 29, 2019.

=== Track listing for the EP ===
All lyrics are written by Joseph Utsler and Joseph Bruce; all music is composed by Mike E. Clark.

Fuck Off! EP (2003 reissue)
No.	Title	Length
1.	"Fuck Off!"	5:34
2.	"Clown Luv"	3:42
3.	"I'm Not Alone"	5:04
4.	"3 Rings" (featuring Violent J)	4:41
Total length:		19:01

=== Charts ===
Chart (2003)	Peak position
US Independent Albums (Billboard)	42

== Release history ==
Release dates and formats for Fuck Off!
Region	Date	Format	Edition	Label
United States	1994	Cassette single	Standard	Psychopathic
United States	1994	Cassette EP	Reissue	Psychopathic
United States	1999	CD EP	Reissue	Psychopathic
United States	2003	CD EP	Reissue	Psychopathic
United States	2019	Vinyl EP	Reissue	Psychopathic
