= DJ Clay =

American rapper

- Born: Michael Velasquez; January 4, 1984 (age 42)
- Origin: Detroit, Michigan, U.S.
- Genres: Hip hop
- Occupations: Producer, rapper, disc jockey
- Years active: 1997–present
- Label: Armed Robbery Entertainment (2019-present)

Michael Velasquez (born January 4, 1984), better known by his stage name DJ Clay, is an American record producer, rapper and disc jockey from Detroit, Michigan. He was signed to Psychopathic Records, but is now on his own label, Armed Robbery Entertainment. As of 2010, Velasquez has sold over 200,000 units.

== Biography ==
While DJing in Southwest Detroit, starting at the age of 13, he started making a name by age 16, by 17 Michael Velasquez performed at several events hosted by Psychopathic Records, including Big Balla X-Mas Party events, Juggalo Championship Wrestling events, charity events, and the release party for Twiztid’s album Man's Myth. In 2006, he was asked by Shaggy 2 Dope to DJ for him on his national "F.T.F.O." tour. After the tour, Velasquez was approached by Insane Clown Posse to DJ all of their tours exclusively . Velasquez was signed by Psychopathic Records in 2007 and began producing songs for several of the label's releases.

At the 2007 Gathering of the Juggalos music festival, it was announced that Velasquez had been signed to Psychopathic Records and their subsidiary label Hatchet House. The following year, it was announced that Velasquez would be releasing a series of mixtapes titled Let 'Em Bleed that would feature artists on Psychopathic Records, Hatchet House and other labels. After releasing four volumes, Velasquez announced in 2010 that he would be releasing a new series of mixtapes titled Book of the Wicked. On June 4, 2013, DJ Clay released a new mixtape titled A World Upside Down.

DJ Clay appeared at the Juggalo March On Washington. In August 2018, it was announced that DJ Clay would be working on a collaboration EP with Danny Diablo. In September 2018, DJ Clay took to social media to announce a "black out" meaning he would be stepping away from social media to work on his new album with Psychopathic and would not return to social media until it was complete.

== Influences ==
Velasquez cites Insane Clown Posse, DJ Q-bert, Mix Master Mike, DMX, Korn, Michael Jackson and The Beatles among his influences.

== Discography ==
- End Of Your Career: The Mixxtape (2006)
- Let 'Em Bleed: The Mixxtape, Vol. 1 (February 19, 2008) (Hatchet House)
- Let 'Em Bleed: The Mixxtape, Vol. 2 (July 2008) (Hatchet House)
- Let 'Em Bleed: The Mixxtape, Vol. 3 (November 11, 2008) (Hatchet House)
- Let 'Em Bleed: The Mixxtape, Vol. 4 (August 6, 2009) (Hatchet House)
- Book of the Wicked, Chapter One (June 8, 2010) (Hatchet House)
- Book of the Wicked, Chapter Two (December 7, 2010) (Hatchet House)
- A World Upside Down: The Mixxtape (June 4, 2013) (Hatchet House)
- Hands of Odd EP (Tour Exclusive EP) (March 2014) (Hatchet House)
- The SidewayZ Room (December 2016) (Psychopathic Records)
- Over The Fear (August 30, 2019) (Armed Robbery Entertainment)

== Features ==
He was featured on the Bloodstepp track "Underground MVP" which also featured Big Hoodoo, Axe Murder Boyz, Spice 1, KidCrusher, Syn and Mike Puwal of Zug Izland from the album Grand Theft UFO: Floppy Disk Edition released in 2014.
