= Hatchet House =

Sub-label of Psychopathic Records

- Parent company: Psychopathic Records
- Founded: 2007
- Founder: Insane Clown Posse
- Distributors: Red Distribution (2007–2010), Fontana Distribution (2010–present)
- Genre: Hip hop
- Country of origin: US
- Location: Royal Oak, Michigan

Hatchet House is the sub-label of independent record label Psychopathic Records, based in Royal Oak, Michigan in the United States, which was formed in 2007 by American hip hop group Insane Clown Posse.

== History ==
Hatchet House was created as a testing ground for underground artists, to see how the Psychopathic Records fan base reacts to them. The label may produce any genre of music. Successful artists on Hatchet House may eventually be signed to Psychopathic Records themselves. At the 2007 Gathering of the Juggalos, Insane Clown Posse released the names of the artists signed to the Hatchet House label: Tali Demon, DJ Clay, and Motown Rage.

On the January 18, 2008, edition of Insane Clown Posse's Weekly Freekly Weekly internet news broadcast, R.O.C. was confirmed to be officially signed to Hatchet House and had begun production on the album Digital Voodoo. He later retired from music following a period of inactivity. Also announced on the Weekly Freekly Weekly is DJ Clay's newest series of mixtapes, which feature "the entire Psychopathic Records family, in ways you've never heard the before [...] redos, remixes, remakes, and collaborations, all unheard of." The entire Psychopathic, as well as Hatchet House, labels will be featured on the series of Let 'Em Bleed Mixxtapes, which is planned to be releasing at least three mixtapes per year. The first volume, Let 'Em Bleed: The Mixxtape, Vol. 1, was released on February 19, 2008. It featured such tracks as Shaggy 2 Dope performing Twiztid's "Fall Apart" and an Esham and Boondox collaboration. Let 'Em Bleed: The Mixxtape, Vol. 2 was released on July 8, 2008, and featured a guest appearance by Detroit rap legend Awesome Dre, and a solo track by non-Psychopathic artist Bizarre of the D12. The third volume was released on November 11, 2008.

On the August 19, 2008 edition of Shaggy 2 Dope's internet radio show, he confirmed that the band Chop Shop had signed to Hatchet House. As explained by Shaggy 2 Dope, "[The band consists of] my little brother and his crew." No date was given for their debut album. The same day, Hatchet House release the compilation Tunnel Runners, featuring material from underground rappers and groups not signed to Hatchet House, such as Mars, Claas, F. Dux, Intrinzik, J Reno, Jason Porter, King Gordy, Lo Key, KidCrusher, Mastamindz, Playaz Lounge Crew, Psycho Jesus, and Q Strange.

In an interview with "Murder Dog Magazine", Violent J stated that he had considered putting out the Axe Murder Boyz' album, Gods Hand. On June 26, 2008, Axe Murder Boyz record company, Canonize Productions, released an advertisement for their new album. The commercial featured flashing images of the Hatchet House logo, as well as the Canonize Productions logo. On August 22, Axe Murder Boyz announced on their website that they were signed to Hatchet House. Gods Hand was released on September 16, 2008. On July 14, 2010 it was announced that The Dayton Family had been signed to the label. The Dayton Family released 2 albums on Hatchet House Psycho EP on February 1, 2011 and Charges of Indictment on June 21, 2011. Shortly after Charges of Indictment was released, The Dayton Family and Hatchet House quietly departed ways with nothing being announced, and hearing nothing about the band's future on the label, causing fans to wonder if TDF was still signed to Hatchet House. Ever since then, Mike E. Clark and DJ Clay have been the only artists to stay with the label. Since they're both producers for the most part, the status of Hatchet House is currently unknown.

== Artists ==
Current

Artist	Year signed	Description
DJ Clay	2007 -	DJ for Psychopathic Records artists.
Mike E. Clark	2009 -	Producer and DJ for Insane Clown Posse.

Former

Artist	Year(s) signed	Albums released on Hatchet House	Description
Tali Demon	2007	-	Left due to a disagreement with the label.
Motown Rage	2007 - 2009	1	A rap metal band from Detroit, Michigan. Released one album on Hatchet House titled With Us Or Against Us.
The R.O.C.	2008 - 2009	1	Released an EP titled Welcome To The Darkside on Hatchet House before retiring from music in 2009. He came out of retirement and signed to Psychopathic. He did not stay long on Psychopathic after Twiztid left.
Chop Shop	2008 - 2010	1	Composed of Shaggy 2 Dope's little brother (Tre Pound) and Southwest Sol, they released one album titled Welcome to the Chop Shop independently with no support from Hatchet House.
Axe Murder Boyz	2008 - 2011	2	First signed to the main label, Psychopathic. Later signed with Hatchet House to release the album Gods Hand and the EP Body in a Hole. After briefly leaving Hatchet House, AMB re-signed with Psychopathic for the second time.
The Dayton Family	2010 - 2011	2	Composed of Bootleg, Shoestring, and Backstabba, The Dayton Family signed to Hatchet House in 2010. They released one EP titled Psycho, and one full-length album titled Charges of Indictment. Shortly after Charges of Indictment was released TDF left Hatchet House.
