= Psychopathic Records discography =

American record label

Psychopathic Records is an American independent record label based in Farmington Hills, Michigan that specializes in hip hop music. Owned by Insane Clown Posse members Joseph Bruce and Joseph Utsler, the label was founded by the group and their manager Alex Abbiss in 1991. Then known as Inner City Posse, the group released the label's first album, Dog Beats, that year. Since its foundation, the label has featured 23 artists and bands from the United States, predominantly around Detroit, Michigan.

Two now defunct subsidiary labels, Ax & Smash Records and Urban Music Zone, were created under Psychopathic Records. In 2007, Psychopathic founded its third subsidiary label, Hatchet House.

== Album releases ==
Year	Artist	Title	Peak chart positions							RIAA Certification (sales thresholds)	Co-labels
Year	Artist	Title	US	US Indie	US Rap	US Heat	US Hip-Hop/R&B	US Tastemakers	US Top Album Sales	RIAA Certification (sales thresholds)	Co-labels
1991	Inner City Posse	Dog Beats	—	—	—	—	—	—	—	—	—
1992	Insane Clown Posse	Carnival of Carnage	—	—	—	—	—	—			—
1993	Insane Clown Posse	Beverly Kills 50187 EP	—	—	—	—	—	—	—	—	—
1994	Insane Clown Posse	Ringmaster	—	—	—	—	—	—	—	Gold	—
1994	Shaggy 2 Dope	Fuck Off! EP	—	—	—	—	—	—	—	—	—
1994	Insane Clown Posse	The Terror Wheel EP	—	—	—	—	—	—	—	—	—
1994	Insane Clown Posse	A Carnival Christmas EP	—	—	—	—	—	—	—	—	—
1995	Project Born	Born Dead EP	—	—	—	—	—	—	—	—	—
1995	Insane Clown Posse	Forgotten Freshness	—	—	—	—	—	—	—	—	—
1995	Insane Clown Posse	Riddle Box	—	—	—	16	—	—	—	Gold	Battery Records
1996	Insane Clown Posse	Tunnel of Love EP	—	—	—	—	—	—	—	—	—
1997	Insane Clown Posse	Mutilation Mix	—	—	—	—	—	—	—	—	—
1997	Insane Clown Posse	The Great Milenko	63	—	—	—	—	—	—	Platinum	Hollywood Records/Island Records
1998	Twiztid	Mostasteless	149	—	—	8	—	—	—	—	—
1998	Myzery	Para La Isla EP	—	—	—	—	—	—	—	—	—
1998	Insane Clown Posse	Forgotten Freshness Volumes 1 & 2	46	—	—	—	—	—	—	Gold	Island Records
1999	Insane Clown Posse	The Amazing Jeckel Brothers	4	—	—	—	—	—	—	Platinum	Island Records
1999	Psychopathic Rydas	Dumpin'	—	—	—	—	—	—	—	—	Joe & Joey Records
2000	Blaze Ya Dead Homie	Blaze Ya Dead Homie EP	—	—	—	—	—	—	—	—	Phantom Zone
2000	Insane Clown Posse	Bizzar	21	—	—	—	—	—	—	—	Island Records
2000	Insane Clown Posse	Bizaar	20	—	—	—	—	—	—	—	Island Records
2000	Twiztid	Freek Show	51	—	—	—	—	—	—	—	—
2000	Twiztid	Cryptic Collection	—	—	—	—	—	—	—	—	—
2001	Various	Big Money Hustlas soundtrack	—	—	—	—	—	—	—	—	—
2001	Dark Lotus	Tales from the Lotus Pod	158	6	—	1	—	—	—	—	—
2001	Blaze Ya Dead Homie	1 Less G n da Hood	—	25	—	19	86	—	—	—	—
2001	Twiztid	Cryptic Collection Vol. 2	—	—	—	—	—	—	—	—	—
2001	Insane Clown Posse	Forgotten Freshness Volume 3	—	10	—	—	—	—	—	—	—
2001	Psychopathic Rydas	Ryden Dirtay	—	46	—	—	—	—	—	—	Joe & Joey Records
2002	Twiztid	Mirror Mirror EP	103	5	—	—	—	—	—	—	—
2002	Jumpsteady	The Chaos Theory EP	—	—	—	—	—	—	—	—	—
2002	Various	Hatchet History: Ten Years of Terror	—	—	—	—	—	—	—	—	—
2002	Insane Clown Posse	The Pendulum	—	—	—	—	—	—	—	—	—
2002	Esham	Acid Rain	—	39	—	—	—	—	—	—	—
2002	Insane Clown Posse	The Wraith: Shangri-La	15	1	—	—	—	—	—	—	—
2003	Zug Izland	Cracked Tiles	—	31	—	48	—	—	—	—	Ax & Smash Records
2003	Anybody Killa	Hatchet Warrior	98	4	—	—	42	—	—	—	—
2003	Twiztid	The Green Book	52	2	—	—	—	—	—	—	—
2003	Violent J	Wizard of the Hood EP	89	3	—	—	31	—	—	—	—
2003	V—Sinizter	Hunting Season	—	—	—	—	—	—	—	—	—
2003	Esham	Repentance	—	10	—	9	71	—	—	—	—
2003	Various	Psychopathics from Outer Space 2	—	10	—	—	—	—	—	—	—
2004	Dark Lotus	Black Rain	71	3	—	—	—	—	—	—	—
2004	Twiztid	Cryptic Collection Vol. 3	85	2	—	—	—	—	—	—	—
2004	Zug Izland	3:33	—	22	—	26	—	—	—	—	Ax & Smash Records
2004	Anybody Killa	Dirty History	152	10	—	7	53	—	—	—	—
2004	MC Breed	The New Prescription	—	—	—	—	—	—	—	—	Urban Music Zone
2004	Insane Clown Posse	The Wraith: Hell's Pit	12	1	—	—	—	—	—	—	—
2004	Blaze Ya Dead Homie	Colton Grundy: The Undying	167	16	—	9	57	—	—	—	—
2004	Monoxide Child	Chainsmoker LP	191	14	—	3	—	—	—	—	—
2004	Psychopathic Rydas	Check Your Shit In Bitch!	—	—	—	—	—	—	—	—	Joe & Joey Records
2005	Jumpsteady	Master of the Flying Guillotine	—	31	—	21	78	—	—	—	—
2005	Anybody Killa	Road Fools EP	—	23	—	—	—	—	—	—	—
2005	Esham	A-1 Yola	176	12	—	—	48	—	—	—	—
2005	Insane Clown Posse	The Calm EP	32	1	—	—	—	—	—	—	—
2005	Twiztid	Man's Myth (Vol. 1)	62	4	14	—	—	—	—	—	—
2005	Twiztid	Mutant (Vol. 2)	80	11	20	—	—	—	—	—	—
2005	Soopa Villainz	Furious	92	—	9	—	42	—	—	—	—
2005	Drive-By	Pony Down (Prelude) EP	—	—	—	—	—	—	—	—	—
2005	Insane Clown Posse	Forgotten Freshness Volume 4	88	4	—	—	—	—	—	—	—
2006	Shaggy 2 Dope	F.T.F.O.	88	7	—	—	—	—	—	—	—
2006	Axe Murder Boyz	Blood In, Blood Out	199	22	—	11	—	—	—	—	—
2006	Jamie Madrox	Phatso	107	3	14	1	—	—	—	—	—
2006	Boondox	The Harvest	—	18	—	12	—	—	—	—	—
2006	Insane Clown Posse	The Wraith: Remix Albums	158	9	—	—	—	—	—	—	—
2007	Insane Clown Posse	The Tempest	20	2	8	—	—	9	20	—	—
2007	Boondox	PunkinHed EP	—	27	—	10	—	—	—	—	—
2007	Twiztid	Independents Day	57	4	9	—	—	—	—	—	—
2007	Insane Clown Posse	Eye of the Storm EP	—	—	—	—	—	—	—	—	—
2007	Blaze Ya Dead Homie	Clockwork Gray	—	14	—	—	34	—	—	—	—
2007	Various	Psychopathics from Outer Space 3	—	34	—	—	—	—	—	—	—
2007	Psychopathic Rydas	Duk Da Fuk Down	—	—	—	—	—	—	—	—	Joe & Joey Records
2008	Dark Lotus	The Opaque Brotherhood	45	4	7	—	23	15	—	—	—
2008	Boondox	Krimson Creek	113	13	12	1	—	—	—	—	—
2008	Anybody Killa	Mudface	—	43	15	—	—	—	—	—	—
2009	Twiztid	W.I.C.K.E.D.	11	1	4	—	—	—	—	—	—
2009	Violent J	The Shining	48	5	14	—	28	—	—	—	—
2009	Insane Clown Posse	Bang! Pow! Boom!	4	1	3	—	—	—	—	—	—
2010	Boondox	South of Hell	54	9	6	—	—	13	—	—	—
2010	Insane Clown Posse	The Old Shit	—	—	—	—	—	—	—	—	—
2010	Blaze Ya Dead Homie	Gang Rags	52	5	9	—	13	—	—	—	—
2010	Twiztid	Heartbroken & Homicidal	29	3	3	—	—	22	29	—	—
2010	Anybody Killa	Medicine Bag	117	15	12	—	—	—	—	—	—
2011	Twiztid	Cryptic Collection Vol. 4	108	17	13	—	—	—	—	—	—
2011	Insane Clown Posse	Featuring Freshness	193	30	14	—	—	—	—	—	—
2011	Psychopathic Rydas	EatShitNDie	—	—	—	—	—	—	—	—	Joe & Joey Records
2011	Psychopathic Rydas	Backdoor Rydas EP	—	—	—	—	—	—	—	—	Joe & Joey Records
2012	Insane Clown Posse	The Mighty Death Pop!	4	—	—	—	—	—	—	—	—
2012	Twiztid	Abominationz	18	4	2	—	—	6	18	—	—
2012	Cold 187um	The Only Solution	133	32	17	6	19	—	—	—	—
2012	Various Artists	Psychopathic Psyphers Collectors Disc EP	—	—	—	—	—	—	—	—	—
2013	Legz Diamond & The Purple Gang	9 Pistolas	—	—	—	—	—	—	—	—	—
2013	DJ Clay	A World Upside Down: The Mixxtape	—	—	—	—	—	—	—	—	Hatchet House
2013	Big Hoodoo	Crystal Skull	—	48	20	3	—	—	—	—	—
2013	Zug Izland	Toxicology: Zug Izland's Dopest Bangers	—	—	—	—	—	—	—	—	—
2013	Jumpsteady	The Road And Other True Stories	—	—	—	—	—	—	—	—	—
2013	Insane Clown Posse	Forgotten Freshness Volume 5	—	—	—	—	—	—	—	—	—
2014	Axe Murder Boyz	The Garcia Brothers	—	—	—	24	—	—	—	—	Canonize Productions
2014	Boondox	Abaddon	147	29	13	—	—	—	—	—	—
2014	Anybody Killa	The Perfection Collection	—	—	—	—	—	—	—	—	—
2014	Dark Lotus	The Mud, Water, Air & Blood	43	4	—	—	8	—	—	—	—
2014	The Killjoy Club	Reindeer Games	133	24	12	—	—	—	—	—	—
2014	Insane Clown Posse	20th Anniversary Hallowicked	—	—	—	—	—	—	—	—	—
2014	Insane Clown Posse	The First Six	—	—	—	—	—	—	—	—	—
2014	Insane Clown Posse	House of Wax EP	—	—	—	—	—	—	—	—	—
2015	Insane Clown Posse	The Marvelous Missing Link: Lost	17	2	2	—	—	7	7	—	—
2015	Insane Clown Posse	The Marvelous Missing Link: Found	136	9	9	—	13	13	58	—	—
2015	Insane Clown Posse	The Phantom EP								—	—
2015	Young Wicked	Slaughter	—	—	—	23	37	—	—	—	—
2015	Insane Clown Posse	The Marvelous Missing Link: The Outtakes	—	—	—	—	—	—	—	—	—
2015	DJ Paul	Master Of Evil	—	—	—	—	—	—	—	—	—
2015	Insane Clown Posse	20th Anniversary: Riddle Box	—	—	—	—	—	—	—	—	—
2015	Insane Clown Posse	The Phantom: X-tra Spooky EP	—	—	—	—	—	—	—	—	—
2016	Blahzay Roze	Broken EP	—	—	—	—	—	—	—	—	—
2016	Big Hoodoo	Asylum	—	—	—	—	—	—	—	—	—
2017	DJ Clay	The Sidewayz Room (mixxtape)	—	—	—	—	—	—	—	—	—
2017	Shaggy 2 Dope	F.T.F.O.M.F.	72	1	—	—	39	—	18	—	—
2017	Insane Clown Posse	Incredible Collectable Collection	—	—	—	—	—	—	—	—	—
2017	Lyte	Psychopathic Monstar EP	—	—	—	—	—	—	—	—	—
2017	Insane Clown Posse	20th Anniversary: The Great Milenko	—	—	—	—	—	—	—	—	—
2017	Various	Bloody Screams Of 17	—	—	—	—	—	—	—	—	—
2018	Various	Hurricane Of Diamonds (17 Mixtape)	—	—	—	—	—	—	—	—	—
2018	Ouija Macc	GutterWater	—	37	—	13	—	—	—	—	—
2018	Ouija Macc	Trashfire EP (rerelease)	—	—	—	—	—	—	—	—	Rotten Cake
2018	Myzery	20th Anniversary: Para la Isla	—	—	—	—	—	—	—	—	—
2018	Myzery	The Demon Angel	—	—	—	—	—	—	—	—	—
2018	Insane Clown Posse	Hell's Cellar EP	—	—	—	—	—	—	—	—	—
2018	Ouija Macc	J EP	—	—	—	—	—	—	—	—	Project Infinite
2018	Ouija Macc	Waterdamage	—	—	—	—	—	—	—	—	Rotten Cake
2019	Violent J	Brother EP	—	—	—	—	—	—	—	—	—
2019	Shaggy 2 Dope	Gloomy Sunday EP	—	—	—	—	—	—	—	—	—
2019	Insane Clown Posse	Fearless Fred Fury	44	2	24	—	26	2	7	—	—
2019	Insane Clown Posse	Flip The Rat EP	—	—	—	—	—	—	—	—	—
2019	Insane Clown Posse	Forgotten Freshness Volume 6	—	—	—	—	—	—	—	—	—
2019	Ouija Macc	50 Shades Of Dead	—	—	—	—	—	—	—	—	Rotten Cake
2019	Ouija Macc	Resistance: The Walk to Wasteland	—	—	—	—	—	—	—	—	
2019	Soopa Villainz	Hit List	—	—	—	—	—	—	—	—	Big Baby Records
2020	Ouija Macc	Resistance II: Hell's Holotape	—	—	—	—	—	—	—	—	Rotten Cake
2020	Ouija Macc	Pretty/Ugly	—	—	—	—	—	—	—	—	
2020	Big Hoodoo	The HooDini Chronicles (Part 1) [The Redbook]	—	—	—	—	—	—	—	—	Ear Drug Musik
2020	Ouija Macc	Wasteland	—	—	—	—	—	—	—	—	Rotten Cake
2020	Ouija Macc	Zodiac	—	—	—	—	—	—	—	—	Rotten Cake
2021	Ouija Macc	Pretty Ugly 2	—	—	—	—	—	—	—	—	—
2021	Ouija Macc	Dirtbag	—	—	—	—	—	—	—	—	Chapter 17
2021	Insane Clown Posse	Yum Yum’s Lure	—	—	—	—	—	—	—	—	—
2021	Insane Clown Posse	You Produce (ICP's House Party Peep Show)	-	-	-	—	-	-	-	—	—
2021	Insane Clown Posse	Yum Yum’s Bedlam	—	—	—	—	—	—	—	—	—
2021	Baby E x Ouija Macc	We Never Forget	—	—	—	—	—	—	—	—	Chapter 17
2022	Insane Clown Posse	Pug Ugly	—	—	—	—	—	—	—	—	—
2022	Insane Clown Posse	Wicked Vic The Weed	—	—	—	—	—	—	—	—	—
2023	Violent J	Bloody Sunday	—	—	—	—	—	—	—	—	—
2023	Shaggy 2 Dope	Professor Shaggs And The Quest For The Ultimate Groove	—	—	—	—	—	—	—	—	—
2023	3 Headed Monster	Obliteration	—	—	—	—	—	—	—	—	—
2023	3 Headed Monster	Rampage	—	—	—	—	—	—	—	—	—
2025	Insane Clown Posse	The Naught	—	—	—	—	—	—	—	—	

== Upcoming album releases ==
Artist	Album	Scheduled Release Date	Co-label
Big Hoodoo	Tha Black Book Vol. III	2025	Ear Drug Musick
Ouija Macc	T.B.A.	2025	Chapter 17

== See also ==
- List of films released by Psychopathic Video
