= A World Upside Down: The Mixxtape =

Mixtape by DJ Clay
- Released: June 4, 2013
- Recorded: 2012–2013
- Genre: Hip hop
- Length: 47:00
- Label: Hatchet House; Psychopathic Records
- Producer: DJ Clay

DJ Clay chronology
Book of the Wicked Chapter Two (2010)	A World Upside Down: The Mixxtape (2013)	The SidewayZ Room (2017)

A World Upside Down: The Mixxtape was released June 4, 2013 on Hatchet House and its parent company Psychopathic Records by DJ Clay. The mixtape, DJ Clay's first for three years, was released on the Psychopathic Records label.

== Track listing ==
Track #	Name	Artist(s)	Length
1	The Beginning	DJ Clay	1:48
2	Goblin	Insane Clown Posse	3:21
3	Let Me Be	Anybody Killa	2:40
4	Don't Push Me	Myzery	2:42
5	Wrong n Tough	Blaze Ya Dead Homie	2:45
6	I'm So Fresh (Ceemix)	Legz Diamond & The Purple Gang (ft. Cold187um)	3:12
7	Siri (Skit)	DJ Clay	0:53
8	When I'm Clownin' (Ceemix)	Insane Clown Posse & Kreayshawn	3:17
9	Officer Hatchet	Violent J	3:46
10	Ferris Wheel	Whitney Peyton	3:06
11	F#%k It up Clay (Skit)	DJ Clay	1:52
12	L.A. (Original Remix)	Cold187um	3:38
13	Shaggy Needs Love (Skit)	DJ Clay	1:46
14	In the Clouds	Kottonmouth Kings	4:02
15	Ride Slow	Drive-By	3:05
16	Skreeem (Joe Strange Remix)	Insane Clown Posse, Hopsin & Tech N9ne	4:06
17	The End	DJ Clay	0:57
