= Slaughter (album) =

Studio album by Young Wicked
- Released: September 4, 2015
- Recorded: 2014–2015
- Genre: Gangsta rap; horrorcore
- Length: 56:07
- Label: Psychopathic Records
- Producer: Insane Clown Posse (exec.); Young Wicked

Young Wicked chronology
Young Wicked: The Mixtape Vol. 1 (2013)	Slaughter (2015)	Vengeance EP (2016)

Slaughter is the debut solo studio album by American rapper and record producer Young Wicked of Axe Murder Boyz. It was released on September 4, 2015 via Psychopathic Records. It features guest appearances from Anybody Killa, Bonez Dubb and JellyRoll. The album peaked at #37 on the Top R&B/Hip-Hop Albums and at #23 on the Heatseekers Albums in the United States.

== Background ==
When Reindeer Games was released, the booklet inside revealed that Young Wicked would release his debut album Slaughter "soon".

At the 2015 Gathering of the Juggalos, Young Wicked announced that he began recording the album on the ShockFest Tour (Insane Clown Posse, Da Mafia 6ix, Mushroomhead, JellyRoll, Madchild and guest Big Hoodoo) with the song "Dope" on the tour bus. Also at the GOTJ he said that the album was done. In August 2015 Psychopathic Records released the Slaughter Sampler as well as preorders for the album.

== Promotion ==
At the 2015 Gathering of the Juggalos, Psychopathic Records released The Phantom with lead single "Dope". In August 2015 the Slaughter Sampler was released and the preorders for the album went up.

In 2016, Young Wicked went on The Hallows' Eve Slaughter Show Tour. He also stated that he was planning on a full-length Slaughter Tour as well.

== Singles/music videos ==
At the 2015 Gathering of the Juggalos, the first single was released titled "Dope" via Phantom.

On April 8, 2016, the second single titled "Y.W.G." (a cover of Wicked Game) was released and was accompanied by a music video.

In mid-2016, Young Wicked stated that he was wrapping up the music video for the song "Slaughter".

== Track listing ==
1. Slaughter
2. Break Me
3. Kill 'Em All
4. Drinkin' On My Fiff
5. Dope (featuring JellyRoll)
6. Yeah Hoe
7. Scathing
8. Uzi (Interlude)
9. Go
10. Menace
11. Fallen Angel
12. Gone
13. All Night Long (featuring Anybody Killa & Bonez Dubb)
14. Y.W.G.

== Personnel ==
- James Garcia – lyrics, vocals, producer
- Jason DeFord – lyrics & vocals (track 5)
- Mike Garcia – lyrics & vocals (track 13)
- James Lowery – lyrics & vocals (track 13)
- Joseph Bruce – executive producer
- Joseph Utsler – executive producer
- Brian Kuma – cover photo

== Charts ==
Chart (2015)	Peak position
US Top R&B/Hip-Hop Albums (Billboard)	37
US Heatseekers Albums (Billboard)	23
