= Forgotten Freshness Volume 3 =

Compilation album by Insane Clown Posse
- Released: December 18, 2001
- Studio: Lotus Pod (Farmington Hills, Michigan)
- Genres: Hip hop, horrorcore, rap rock
- Length: 70:39
- Labels: Psychopathic; 7 56504 30002 2
- Producers: Insane Clown Posse, DJ Paul, Juicy J, Mike E. Clark, Mike Puwal, Systastrosis Soundsquad

Insane Clown Posse chronology
Bizzar (2000)	Forgotten Freshness Volume 3 (2001)	The Pendulum (2002)

Professional ratings
Review scores
Source	Rating
AllMusic	3/5 stars
Rolling Stone	2/5 stars

Forgotten Freshness Volume 3 is a rarities album by Insane Clown Posse. Released in 2001, it was notable for being their first release to feature Mike Puwal as a producer rather than Mike E. Clark. It is the group's 3rd installment in the "Forgotten Freshness album series", their 4th compilation album, and their 16th overall release.

== Music and lyrics ==
"Intro" is a real radio commercial from 1994 that promoted the group's "Ringmaster Tour" in Detroit. "Fly Away" was the first song recorded by Zug Izland. A different mix of the song was released on their debut album Cracked Tiles. The song "Run!" was originally created by Insane Clown Posse to test their new producer Mike Puwal's skills. "Nuttin' But a Bitch Thang" was recorded during the group's feud with Eminem. The song itself was a response to Eminem's song "Marshall Mathers" from his The Marshall Mathers LP.

The songs "It" and "Super Star" were recorded and written by Joseph Bruce during a late-night studio session with Mike E. Clark when he was "bored". "The Mom Song" was recorded by Violent J and long-time friend, the Rude Boy, in March 1999, while on "The Amazing Jeckel Brothers Tour". The song was made as a Mother's Day gift for both their mothers. The songs "Cartoon Nightmare" and "Take Me Home" were recorded specifically for Forgotten Freshness Volume 3.

The song "Take It!" was originally written about Satan. Joseph Bruce explains that the song is about having "to watch somebody [he] knew go to Hell and meet the devil." Bruce would have no control over what would happen to his friend, and the only advice he could give would be to "take [whatever punishment the Devil gives]." When the group went to wrestle in World Championship Wrestling, the company asked to use the song for wrestler Vampiro's entrance music. Insane Clown Posse agreed, and added background vocals which said "Vampiro" to make the song be about him.

== Track listing ==
No.	Title	Music	Length
1.	"Intro"	Radio commercial from 1994	1:03
2.	"Cartoon Nightmares"	original	3:54
3.	"Posse on Vernor"	from Take a Bite Outta Rhyme: A Rock Tribute to Rap	4:50
4.	"Fly Away" (Zug Izland)	original	4:34
5.	"It"	original	3:57
6.	"Run!"	from The Pendulum #11	3:01
7.	"Nuttin' But a Bitch Thang"	from The Pendulum #6	4:25
8.	"Just Another Crazy Click" (Three 6 Mafia w/ Twiztid)	from When the Smoke Clears: Sixty 6, Sixty 1	3:56
9.	"Take It!"	from WCW Mayhem: The Music	3:19
10.	"Super Star"	from The Pendulum #9	4:52
11.	"Every Halloween"	from Hallowicked 2001	3:21
12.	"The Mom Song" (w/ Rude Boy)		4:09
13.	"Insane Killers" (with Vanilla Ice and La the Darkman)	from Bi-Polar	4:50
14.	"Confessions"	from The Pendulum #8 / scrapped from The Great Milenko	3:58
15.	"When Vampiro Gets High" (with Vampiro)	outtake from "Maniac Killa" from the Twiztid album Freek Show	1:58
16.	"Take Me Home*"	original	8:57

- At the 6:09 mark of "Take Me Home" a bonus track featuring Violent J and Jumpsteady's family members plays

== Chart positions ==
Chart (2002)	Peak position
Top Independent Albums	10
