= The Wraith: Remix Albums =

Remix album by Insane Clown Posse
- Released: November 14, 2006
- Genre: Hip-hop
- Length: 1:38:39
- Label: Psychopathic

Insane Clown Posse chronology
Forgotten Freshness Volume 4 (2005)	The Wraith: Remix Albums (2006)	The Tempest (2007)

Professional ratings
Review scores
Source	Rating
AllMusic	2.5/5 stars

The Wraith: Remix Albums is a remix double album by American hip-hop duo Insane Clown Posse. Released in 2006 via Psychopathic Records, it contains remixes of tracks from the group's 2002 album The Wraith: Shangri-La and 2004 album Hell's Pit. It is the group's 7th compilation album, and their 22nd overall release.

In the United States, the album debuted at number 158 on the Billboard 200, number 23 on the Top Rap Albums and number 9 on the Independent Albums charts, with 7,500 copies sold.

== Track listing ==
Shangri-La
No.	Title	Length
1.	"Walk into the Light" (Mike E. Clark Remix)	4:20
2.	"Welcome to Thy Show" (Kuma Remix)	3:17
3.	"Get Ya Wicked On" (Wolf Pac Remix)	2:23
4.	"Murder Rap" (Filthee Immigrants Remix)	3:03
5.	"Birthday Bitches" (Kuma Remix)	1:42
6.	"Blaaam!!!" (Tino Gross Remix)	4:00
7.	"It Rains Diamonds/Bitch Slappaz" (Kuma Remix)	5:18
8.	"Thy Staleness" (Fritz The Cat Remix)	3:57
9.	"Hell's Forecast" (Mike E. Clark Remix)	4:07
10.	"Juggalo Homies" (Mike E. Clark Remix)	3:37
11.	"We Belong" (Kottonmouth Kings Remix)	2:53
12.	"Cotton Candy & Popsicles" (Filthee Immigrants Remix)	4:09
13.	"Crossing Thy Bridge" (Kuma Remix)	4:47
14.	"Thy Raven's Mirror" (Fritz The Cat Remix)	3:20
15.	"Thy Wraith" (Tino Gross Remix)	3:47

Hell's Pit
No.	Title	Length
16.	"Walk into the Darkness" (Mike E. Clark Remix)	4:37
17.	"Suicide Hotline" (Monoxide Remix)	3:03
18.	"C.P.K.'s" (Mike E. Clark Remix)	3:09
19.	"Truly Alone" (Kuma Remix)	3:36
20.	"Everyday I Die" (Mike E. Clark Remix)	3:14
21.	"The Witch" (Tech N9ne Remix)	3:23
22.	"Bowling Balls" (Monoxide Remix)	3:19
23.	"24" (DJ Clay Remix)	2:16
24.	"Burning Up" (Mike E. Clark Remix)	3:52
25.	"Sedatives" (Fritz The Cat Remix)	2:35
26.	"In My Room" (Wolf Pac Remix)	4:10
27.	"Angels Falling" (Kottonmouth Kings Remix)	3:42
28.	"Manic Depressive" (Fritz The Cat Remix)	3:03
Total length:		1:38:39

== Personnel ==
- Joseph "Violent J" Bruce – lyrics & vocals
- Joseph "Shaggy 2 Dope" Utsler – lyrics & vocals
- Razorblade Twins – guitar (tracks: 2, 5, 7, 13)
- Erik Gustafson – guitar (tracks: 6, 15), banjo (track 6)
- Mike E. Clark – remixing (tracks: 1, 9, 10, 16, 18, 20, 24)
- Brian Kuma – remixing (tracks: 2, 5, 7, 13, 19)
- Wolfpac – remixing (tracks: 3, 26)
- F.I.L.T.H.E.E. Immigrants – remixing (tracks: 4, 12)
- Martin "Tino" Gross – remixing (tracks: 6, 15)
- Fritz "The Cat" Van Kosky – remixing (tracks: 8, 14, 25, 28)
- Kottonmouth Kings – remixing (tracks: 11, 27)
- Paul "Monoxide" Methric – remixing (tracks: 17, 22)
- Aaron D. "Tech N9NE" Yates – remixing (track 21)
- Michael "Seven" Summers – remixing (track 21)
- Robert Rebeck – remixing (track 21)
- Michael "DJ Clay" Velasquez – remixing (track 23)

== Charts ==
Chart (2006)	Peak position
US Billboard 200	158
US Top Rap Albums (Billboard)	23
US Independent Albums (Billboard)	9
