= Wizard of the Hood =

EP by Violent J
- Released: July 22, 2003
- Recorded: The Lotus Pod, Novi, Michigan
- Genre: Hip hop
- Length: 34:27
- Label: Psychopathic Records
- Producer: Violent J Mike Puwal

Violent J chronology
Enter the Ghetto Zone (1990)	Wizard of the Hood (2003)	The Shining (2009)

Wizard of the Hood is the debut EP by Violent J. Released in 2003, it is the Insane Clown Posse member's first solo release. The EP is a concept album based on The Wizard of Oz, which is retold in an urban setting. Several tracks from the EP also sample music from the 1978 film The Wiz, another urban reimagining of The Wizard of Oz. A song with the same title had previously been released on the album Carnival of Carnage.

== Plot ==
Violent J takes on the role of this story's version of Dorothy, making his way through this strange new land to get back to his home. Along the way, he meets the Scarecrow (Twiztid's Monoxide), who only needs somebody to smoke with, the Tin Man (Twiztid's Jamie Madrox), who wants a "gat", and the Lion (Blaze Ya Dead Homie), who wants some "hoes". Anybody Killa has a brief cameo as a guard in the Wizard's palace as well as fellow Insane Clown Posse member Shaggy 2 Dope appears as the Wizard.

== Release ==
The EP contains nine story tracks and two "bonus tracks". It was also released in a "Collector's Edition" tin which featured two different bonus tracks and a package of "Violent Joint" rolling paper. In an early 2014 interview Violent J said that he would like to do a Wizard Of The Hood show. During ICP's 2014 GOTJ seminar he said that it may happen very soon. On July 24, 2015 during ICP's seminar Violent J said that he would like to do a Wizard of the Hood full album set at the 2016 GOTJ if Twiztid and Blaze Ya Dead Homie are down to do it also. Violent J announced in October, 2015 that they will be performing the whole Wizard of the Hood setlist for GOTJ 17 (2016) complete with changing sets and Twiztid and Blaze Ya Dead Homie will be on stage to do their parts.

Professional ratings
Review scores
Source	Rating
Allmusic	2.5/5 stars

== Track listing ==
#	Title	Time	Writer(s)	Performer(s)
1	"Intro"	0:40	Violent J Mike Puwal	Violent J
2	"Let It Rain"	2:42	Violent J Mike Puwal	Violent J
3	"Yellow Brick Alleyway"	3:19	Violent J Mike Puwal	Violent J Legz Diamond
4	"Homies 2 Smoke With"	3:52	Violent J Mike Puwal	Violent J Monoxide
5	"Thug Whilin'"	3:13	Violent J Mike Puwal	Violent J Twiztid
6	"Horribly Horrifying"	5:13	Violent J Mike Puwal	Violent J Triple Threat
7	"What You Thinkin' About?"	3:30	Violent J Mike Puwal	Violent J Triple Threat
8	"Shiny Diamonds"	3:44	Violent J Mike Puwal	Violent J
9	"The Wizard's Palace"	2:51	Violent J Mike Puwal	Dark Lotus
	Bonus tracks:			
10	"Axes Swingin'"	2:04	Violent J Mike Puwal	Violent J
11	"Multiple Myselves"	2:59	Violent J Mike Puwal	Violent J
	"Collector's Edition" bonus tracks:			
10	"My Shine"	3:22	Violent J Mike Puwal	Violent J
11	"Bloody Bitch Dead"	2:47	Violent J Mike Puwal	Violent J

== Cast ==
- Violent J — Violent J
- Monoxide — Scarecrow
- Madrox — Tin Tizzy
- Blaze Ya Dead Homie — The Lion
- Anybody Killa — Palace Guard
- Shaggy 2 Dope — The Wizard

== Chart positions ==
Chart (1999)	Peak Position
Billboard 200	89
Top Independent Albums	3
Top R&B/Hip-Hop Albums	31
