= Ryden Dirtay =

Studio album by Psychopathic Rydas
- Released: July 3, 2001
- Studio: Lotus Pod (Farmington Hills, Michigan)
- Genre: Gangsta rap
- Length: 49:15
- Labels: Joe & Joey Records; J&J 1003

Psychopathic Rydas chronology
Dumpin' (1999)	Ryden Dirtay (2001)	Check Your Shit In Bitch! (2004)

Ryden Dirtay is the second studio album by American gangsta rap supergroup Psychopathic Rydas. It was released on July 3, 2001, through Joe & Joey Records. The album made it to #46 on the Independent Albums chart in the United States.

== Track listing ==
No.	Title	Length
1.	"Intrizzo"	1:05
2.	"Gangsta Shit"	4:24
3.	"Nobody in Dis Game"	3:13
4.	"Never Gone Quit"	4:09
5.	"Boom!"	4:33
6.	"Ride 2 da End"	4:08
7.	"Bye Bye"	4:09
8.	"Dem Bitches"	3:09
9.	"There It Goes"	3:23
10.	"Ryden Dirtay"	4:28
11.	"Ride Out"	4:15
12.	"Thumpin'"	3:21
13.	"Murder Follows Me"	4:58
Total length:		49:15

== Personnel ==
- Bullet – vocals, lyrics
- Full Clip – vocals, lyrics
- Lil Shank – vocals, lyrics
- Foe Foe – vocals, lyrics
- Cell Block – vocals, lyrics

== Charts ==
Chart (2010)	Peak position
US Independent Albums (Billboard)	46
