= Behind the Paint =

2003 autobiography by Joseph Bruce and Hobey Echlin

- Behind the Paint first edition cover.
- Author: Joseph Bruce; Hobey Echlin
- Cover artist: Meecal Gibson
- Language: English
- Subject: Autobiography
- Publisher: Psychopathic Records
- Publication date: July 2003
- Publication place: United States
- Media type: Print (Hardcover)
- Pages: 596
- ISBN: 978-09741846-0-9
- OCLC: 53312411

Behind the Paint is the 2003 autobiography of American hip hop artist Joseph Bruce, better known as Violent J, one half of the Detroit, Michigan hip hop group Insane Clown Posse. The book focuses on Bruce's entire life until 2002. It begins with a chronological account of his childhood, professional wrestling career, and musical career, including the conception of Insane Clown Posse's Dark Carnival mythology and the development of their fan base, known as "Juggalos".

== Content ==
Behind the Paint opens with Bruce's father stealing all of the family's money and leaving when Joe was two years old. His mother briefly marries an abusive man that molests Joe and his older siblings Robert and Theresa. Joe later meets John and Joey Utsler, and the group's backyard wrestling, musical, and gang activities are chronicled. Bruce recalls briefly living in Bonnie Doone, North Carolina at the age of 17, and cites the open racism that he witnessed there as a source of the hatred for bigots referenced in future Insane Clown Posse's lyrics.

The book describes the group's genesis, including Bruce's involvement in professional wrestling, the formation of group Inner City Posse with John and Joey Utlser, as well as establishing their record label Psychopathic Records. The book also discusses the beginnings of what would become Insane Clown Posse and the origins of the group's Dark Carnival mythology, and the albums inspired by it.

The book also documents the group's early struggles, personnel changes and the changing local Detroit music scene.

The book also focus their highly publicized falling-out with Hollywood Records and subsequent signing to Island Records, their eventual return to Psychopathic Records and the production of their full-length feature film, Big Money Hustlas.

The books ends with Bruce reflecting on the group's previous successes, their one platinum and three gold albums, and the release of the group's sixth Joker's Card, The Wraith: Shangri-La .

== Publication and reception ==
Behind the Paint was originally released in July 2003 with a revised second edition released in August 2004. Wired magazine writer Brian Raftery commented on the candid manner of Bruce's writing, calling the book a "soul-baring memoir filled with unpleasant details."
