= Soopa Villainz =

American hip hop group

- Soopa Villainz members Mr. Heart, Mr. Diamond, Mr. Spade, and Mr. Club

Background information
- Origin: Detroit, Michigan
- Genres: Hip hop
- Years active: 2002–2005; 2018–present
- Label: Psychopathic Records
- Members: Mr. Diamond (2002–2005; 2018–present); Mr. Club (2002–2005; 2018–present); Mr. Spade (2002–2005; 2018–present)
- Past members: Mr. Heart (Lavel) (2002–2005)

Soopa Villainz is an American hip hop supergroup based in Detroit, Michigan. Formed in 2002, the group consists of Joseph Bruce (Mr. Diamond), Joseph Utsler (Mr. Club) and Esham (Mr. Spade). Lavel (Mr. Heart) was later added to the lineup, but left during the group's hiatus. Since 2018, the group has reverted to its original lineup. The songs of Soopa Villainz center thematically on nefarious actions conducted by comic book supervillains. The group went on hiatus in 2005. ICP announced at its 2016 GOTJ seminar that the group would be reuniting for 2017. During ICP's performance on July 21, 2018, a banner showing the groups logo was unfurled, teasing the return of the group.

Soopa Villainz made their on stage return at the 20th annual "Soopa" Gathering of the Juggalos in Springville, Indiana on August 2, 2019.

== History ==
The group made their debut appearances in 2002 on Esham's Acid Rain and Insane Clown Posse's The Wraith: Shangri-La. Later that year, the group released the Halloween single "Silence of the Hams." In 2005, they released their debut album Furious. The album peaked at number 9 on the Billboard "Top Independent Albums" chart, number 42 on the "Top R&B/Hip-Hop Albums" chart, and number 92 on the Billboard 200.

Following a disagreement with the label, Esham and Lavel left Psychopathic Records in October, effectively disbanding the Soopa Villainz.

During the ICP 2016 GOTJ on July 22, 2016, it was announced that at the GOTJ 2017 there may be a Soopa Villainz reunion. The next day on July 24, 2016, Esham announced via social media that he will not be performing at another GOTJ again, stating "I will not follow in someone else's shadow".

During Insane Clown Posse's 2018 GOTJ seminar, Violent J said that the 2019 GOTJ would be themed The Soopa Gathering in honor of it being the 20th Annual, but few understood what he was alluding to. During ICP's Saturday night performance, they brought out Esham for a song, and then revealed that indeed Soopa Villainz have reunited and will indeed release a new album and will be at the 2019 GOTJ.

On September 18, 2019, it was announced that The Villainz would be performing on Devil's Night in Detroit, MI, at the El Club, just 24 hours before ICP's annual Hallowicked Show.

== Discography ==
Studio albums

- Furious (August 16, 2005)

Compilation albums

- It Ain't Safe No More (May 20, 2006)
- Hit List (July 26, 2019)

Singles

- "Ricochet" (October 31, 2019)
