= Pony Down (Prelude) =

EP by Drive-By
- Released: October 4, 2005
- Recorded: Early 2005
- Genre: Midwest hip hop
- Length: 32:56
- Label: Psychopathic Records
- Producer: Fritz the Cat; Soopa Villainz

Drive-By chronology
Pony Down (Prelude) (2005)	Back On Da Block (2013)

Pony Down (Prelude) is the debut EP by American hip hop duo Drive-By, which consists of Anybody Killa and Blaze Ya Dead Homie. It was released on October 4, 2005, under Psychopathic Records. Primarily produced by the Soopa Villainz (with the exception of Fritz the Cat producing "The Arrival"), the EP's sound is based on old school hip hop, which "throws back to classic bass tracks, from a time when trunks thumped and big bass bumped; an album that is straight rap patterns, with tight rhythm and loud sound." It was reissued in 2008 with two bonus tracks: "Yellow Tape" and "By My Side".

== Track listing ==
=== Original version ===
1. "Hear Us Comin'"
2. "The Arrival"
3. "Whistle"
4. "Pony Down"
5. "This High"
6. "Hear Me Now"
7. "She's Out There"
8. "Black Khakis"
9. "All I Know"
10. "This High (Remix)" (featuring Violent J, Lavel & Esham)

=== Reissue ===
1. "Hear Us Comin'"
2. "The Arrival"
3. "Whistle"
4. "Pony Down"
5. "This High"
6. "Hear Me Now"
7. "Yellow Tape"
8. "She's Out There"
9. "Black Khakis"
10. "By My Side"
11. "All I Know"
12. "This High (Remix)" (featuring Violent J, Lavel & Esham)
- The song "This High (Remix)" contains verses by Violent J, Lavel & Esham, though they are uncredited.
