= Hell's Pit =

2004 album by Insane Clown Posse

Studio album by Insane Clown Posse
- Released: August 31, 2004
- Recorded: 2003–04
- Studio: The Lotus Pod (Farmington Hills, Michigan)
- Genre: Horrorcore
- Length: 64:18
- Label: Psychopathic
- Producer: Insane Clown Posse

Insane Clown Posse chronology
The Wraith: Shangri-La (2002)	Hell's Pit (2004)	The Tempest (2007)

The Wraith: Hell's Pit
- Outer cardboard slip cover

Hell's Pit is the ninth studio album by the American hip hop duo Insane Clown Posse. It was released on August 31, 2004, via Psychopathic Records as a follow-up to 2002 The Wraith: Shangri-La and the second half of the sixth and final Joker Card in the first Deck of the Dark Carnival mythology. Recording sessions took place at the Lotus Pod in Farmington Hills. Production was handled by ICP themselves.

The album peaked at number 12 on the Billboard 200 and topped the Independent Albums charts in the United States. It also made it to number 49 in the ARIA Top 100 Albums Chart, and peaked at number 25 on the Rock & Metal Albums Chart and at number 22 on the Independent Albums Chart in the UK music charts.

Thirteen of its 17 original tracks were remixed and included in The Wraith: Remix Albums compilation album, which was released on November 14, 2006.

== History ==
Following the release of 2002 The Wraith: Shangri-La, group member Violent J admitted that he was considering not completing the production of Hell's Pit. He is quoted as describing Shangri-La as "the end of the road. It's the end of the Joker's Cards. After this I could do anything I want, for the rest of my life. The positivity was so unbelievable".

== Music ==
=== Production ===
Preceding the release of Hell's Pit, Violent J stated the album's sound was intended as a throwback to the minimalistic sound of Carnival of Carnage, particularly its darker second half. He also stated that it would contain less rock elements and singing, and that it would not feature guest appearances. "Bowling Balls" samples the drum beat of Madonna's "Justify My Love", which was based upon Public Enemy's instrumental "Security of the First World", which was in turn based on the end drum break of James Brown's "Funky Drummer".

=== Lyrical themes ===
Hell's Pit is the second part of the sixth Joker's Card, The Wraith, written with the opposite intent of its counterpart, Shangri-La, Hell's Pit is intended to illustrate the horrors of hell itself. Many of the songs feature Violent J and Shaggy 2 Dope fictitiously dying, to be sent to Hell, depicted in the album as a place void of all hope and peace, where those who do not atone for their sins and follow the ways of Shangri-La will presumably be sent upon their death. Violent J described the album as "Horror tale after Horror tale, mixed in with songs that describe hell" and stated that it was the darkest, most painful work he had ever done.

== Release ==
Two versions of the album were released, each containing a different DVD. One release featured a live concert and a twelve-minute music video for the song "Real Underground Baby", and another featured a short 3D film for the song "Bowling Balls", shot in high-definition video.

== Critical reception ==
Professional ratings
Review scores
Source	Rating
AllMusic	2.5/5 stars
RapReviews	3.5/10

Of the album's conclusion to the Dark Carnival storyline, AllMusic's David Jeffries wrote that "Insane Clown Posse sound tired of the concept, only getting inspired when they've moved on from it". Steve 'Flash' Juon of RapReviews wrote that "Hell's Pit may be appopriately [sic] named, if only because I felt like I was in a burning pit of Hell in my ears while listening to it. Actually, that might be preferable to ever playing this album again". Walker MacMurdo of Willamette Week stated: "although the first half of the album bears a little too much of a resemblance to Korn's disappointing output of the early 2000s, the consistency of the second half of Hell's Pit makes it one of ICP's stronger offerings".

== Track listing ==
All lyrics are written by Joseph Bruce and Joseph Utsler, except for track 2 contains additional lyrics by Rich Murrell.

No.	Title	Music	Length
1.	"Intro"		1:31
2.	"Walk into the Darkness"	Mike Puwal	3:24
3.	"Suicide Hotline"	Fritz The Cat	3:32
4.	"C.P.K.'s"	Esham	2:47
5.	"Truly Alone"	Fritz The Cat	3:54
6.	"Everyday I Die"	Mike Puwal	3:23
7.	"The Night of the 44"	Insane Clown Posse; Esham	3:00
8.	"The Witch"	Mike Puwal	3:16
9.	"Bowling Balls"	B. Jones (uncredited)	3:28
10.	"24"	Violent J; Esham	2:13
11.	"Burning Up"	Mike Puwal	3:34
12.	"Sedatives"	Mike Puwal	2:58
13.	"In My Room"	Mike Puwal	3:51
14.	"Basehead Attack"	Esham	4:16
15.	"Angels Falling"	Esham	3:21
16.	"Manic Depressive"	Violent J; Esham	3:14
17.	"Real Underground Baby"	Esham	12:36
Total length:			64:18

== Personnel ==
- Joseph "Violent J" Bruce – lyrics, vocals, producer, engineering (tracks: 2, 3, 5, 7, 8, 10, 12–17), mixing & editing (track 17), concept
- Joseph "Shaggy 2 Dope" Utsler – lyrics, vocals, producer, scratches & mixing (track 17), concept
- Rich "Legz Diamond" Murrell – additional lyrics (track 2)
- Michelle Rapp – additional vocals (track 15)
- Michael J. "Mike P." Puwal – engineering (tracks: 2, 5, 6, 8, 11–13), mixing (tracks: 2, 3, 5–8, 10–17)
- Fritz "The Cat" Van Kosky – engineering & mixing (tracks: 3, 5, 17)
- Esham Smith – engineering & mixing (tracks: 7, 10, 14–17)

"Bowling Balls" samples "Security of the First World" by Public Enemy

== Charts ==
Chart (2004)	Peak position
Australian Albums (ARIA)	49
UK Rock & Metal Albums (Official Charts)	25
UK Independent Albums (Official Charts)	22
US Billboard 200	12
US Independent Albums (Billboard)	1

== Hell's Cellar ==
Hell's Cellar

EP by Insane Clown Posse
- Released: July 19, 2018
- Genre: Horrorcore
- Length: 35:39
- Label: Psychopathic Records
- Producer: Insane Clown Posse

Insane Clown Posse chronology
Phantom X-tra Spooky Edition (2015)	Hell's Cellar (2018)	Magical Bag Of Poop (2018)

Hell's Cellar an extended play by American hip hop duo Insane Clown Posse. It was released on July 19, 2018 at the Gathering of the Juggalos festival via Psychopathic Records. It is composed of nine outtakes from The Wraith: Hell's Pit and has no verses from Shaggy 2 Dope.

Professional ratings
Review scores
Source	Rating
AllMusic	3/5 stars

In 2017, it was announced that Insane Clown Posse would perform The Wraith: Hell's Pit album in its entirety at the 2018 Gathering of the Juggalos (happened July 18 – 20 at Legend Valley in Thornville, Ohio). On July 13, 2018, the duo announced that in preparation for the 2018 Gathering of the Juggalos, they had found nine "lost Violent J recordings from the Hell's Pit recording sessions" and would release them as an EP on the day of the Hell's Pit show (July 19, 2018), and titled it Hell's Cellar. During ICP's seminar, they announced that they found 13 songs all together, but decided to release nine then and the rest on the 20th anniversary edition.

Hell's Cellar
No.	Title	Length
1.	"Hell's Pit Intro" (Extended)	1:37
2.	"Clown Show"	3:45
3.	"Can't End Myself"	3:23
4.	"Takin' It Away"	4:01
5.	"I Can See It All"	3:41
6.	"Big Bad Wolf"	3:36
7.	"Alakazam"	3:27
8.	"Spontaneous Combust"	4:37
9.	"The Truth"	7:32
Total length:		35:39
