= Psychopathic Records Headquarters =

Former recording studio in Michigan

- Lotus Pod
- Interactive map of Psychopathic Records Headquarters
- Address: 32575 Folsom Road
- Location: Farmington Hills, Michigan, United States
- Coordinates: 42°27′15″N 83°22′08″W
- Owner: Psychopathic Records
- Type: Recording studio Corporate offices

Construction
- Opened: 2001
- Closed: 2021

The Psychopathic Records Headquarters, also referred to as the Lotus Pod was a recording studio and warehouse located in Farmington Hills, Michigan. The building also served as the headquarters for Psychopathic Records, a record label owned by the horrorcore hip-hop group, the Insane Clown Posse, from 2001 to 2021.

== History ==
Prior to the opening of the Lotus Pod, the Insane Clown Posse and Psychopathic Records had been recording their music at various studios across Metropolitan Detroit including the Tempermill Studio in Ferndale, Pulsar Sound Studios, The Disc Ltd., Cynder Block Studios, Miller Midi Productions and 313 Studios in Detroit, and the Fun House in Royal Oak, a home recording studio owned by their producer Mike E. Clark, which continues to operate to the present day. At these studios, Insane Clown Posse recorded what would be the first five "joker's card" albums including Carnival of Carnage, Ringmaster, Riddle Box, The Great Milenko, The Amazing Jeckel Brothers. Following ICP's departure from Island Records, the duo and Psychopathic, with the assistance of a newly-hired studio engineer named Mike Puval, began construction on what would be the new headquarters for Psychopathic Records, which also included a recording studio which the label referred to as the "Lotus Pod" which opened in the Spring of 2001. The first album to be recorded at the Lotus Pod would be the Dark Lotus album Tales from the Lotus Pod.

In 2002, ICP recorded the final parts of the final joker's card album of the first deck titled The Wraith: Shangri-La at the studio after recording the first parts in Nashville, Tennessee, Dallas, Texas, and Las Vegas, Nevada.

In February 2021, the building hosted the Juggalo Weekend Month Long Livestream Extravaganza which featured a late night Funhouse talk show, concerts from various Psychopathic artists, a "Juggalo Night Court", and a Juggalo Championship Wrestling (JCW) show titled Best 0f Oddball Brutality. On April 10, 2021, JCW held another show at the building titled Fenced in Fury at the Folsom Felony Funhouse which was streamed live on Patreon. In May 2021, the studio was sold and future Psychopathic music was recorded in various studios across the United States.
