= Reindeer Games (album) =

Studio album by The Killjoy Club
- Released: September 2, 2014
- Recorded: March–July 2014
- Length: 68:54
- Label: Psychopathic Records
- Producers: DJ Paul; FNA; Insane Clown Posse; Kuma; Young Wicked; Seven; T-Why

Reindeer Games is the debut studio album by American hip-hop supergroup the Killjoy Club, consisting of groups Insane Clown Posse (Violent J & Shaggy 2 Dope) and Da Mafia 6ix (DJ Paul, Crunchy Black & Koopsta Knicca). The album was released by Psychopathic Records on September 2, 2014.

== Background ==
In March 2014, DJ Paul announced Da Mafia 6ix and Insane Clown Posse would release a collaboration album in August 2014. In July 2014, during the Insane Clown Posse 2014 GOTJ seminar, it was announced that they had formed a group with Da Mafia 6ix called The Killjoy Club and that their debut album, titled Reindeer Games, would be released on September 2, 2014.

DJ Paul had stated that The Killjoy Club collective was originally slated to be himself, Insane Clown Posse and Houston based rapper Scarface. No specifications were given on why this lineup changed.

== Promotion ==
In August 2014, it was announced Insane Clown Posse and Da Mafia 6ix would be going on tour to promote the album, but doing their own respective sets. They toured with Mushroomhead, Madchild and JellyRoll titled ShockFest, starting on September 25, 2014, and ending on October 31. On August 14, 2014, the track listing was released, the album features guest appearances from Young Wicked aka Otis of Axe Murder Boyz, Sugar Slam, Big Hoodoo and Boondox.

== Track listing ==
No.	Title	Producer(s)	Length
1.	"Intro"	Brian Kuma, Insane Clown Posse	1:53
2.	"Don't Fuck Wit Me" (featuring Sugar Slam)	DJ Paul, T–Why, FNA	4:24
3.	"Surprize" (featuring Young Wicked)	Brian Kuma, Insane Clown Posse	4:40
4.	"Jump" (featuring Young Wicked and Sugar Slam)	DJ Paul, T–Why, FNA	4:44
5.	"Panic Mode" (featuring Young Wicked)	Seven, Brian Kuma, Insane Clown Posse	3:47
6.	"Hammer Time" (featuring Young Wicked)	DJ Paul, T–Why, FNA	5:46
7.	"Fools" (featuring Young Wicked)	Seven, Brian Kuma, Insane Clown Posse	5:14
8.	"It's a Murder It's a Kill" (featuring Young Wicked)	DJ Paul, T–Why, FNA	4:53
9.	"Ghetto Blaster" (featuring Young Wicked)	Seven, Brian Kuma, Insane Clown Posse	3:25
10.	"Devil Made Me Do It" (featuring Big Hoodoo)	DJ Paul, T–Why, FNA	5:15
11.	"Rambo" (featuring Sugar Slam, Young Wicked and Boondox)	Seven, Brian Kuma, Insane Clown Posse	4:45
12.	"Braver Than Me" (featuring Young Wicked)	DJ Paul, T–Why, FNA	5:31
13.	"Double Clutch" (featuring Sugar Slam and Young Wicked)	Seven, Brian Kuma, Insane Clown Posse	4:05
14.	"Live to Kill U"	DJ Paul, T–Why, FNA	4:52
15.	"Fuck Death" (featuring Young Wicked)	Seven, Brian Kuma, Insane Clown Posse	3:29
16.	"Outro"	DJ Paul, T–Why, FNA	2:11
Total length:			68:54

== Credits ==
=== The Killjoy Club ===
- Violent J - Vocals, Lyrics, Production
- Shaggy 2 Dope - Vocals, Lyrics, Production
- DJ Paul - Vocals, Lyrics, Production
- Crunchy Black - Vocals, Lyrics, Production
- Koopsta Knicca - Vocals, Lyrics, Production

=== Other personnel ===
- Young Wicked - Vocals, Lyrics, Production (3, 4, 5, 6, 7, 8, 9, 11, 12, 13, 15)
- Sugar Slam - Vocals, Lyrics (2, 4, 11, 13)
- Big Hoodoo - Vocals, Lyrics (9, 10)
- Boondox - Vocals, Lyrics (11)
- Kuma - Production (1, 3, 5, 7, 9, 11, 13, 15)
- T-Why - Production (2, 4, 6, 8, 10, 12, 14, 16)
- FNA - Production (2, 4, 6, 8, 10, 12, 14, 16)
- Seven - Production (5, 7, 9, 11, 13, 15)

== Charts ==
Chart (2014)	Peak position
US Billboard 200	133
US Independent Albums (Billboard)	24
US Top R&B/Hip-Hop Albums (Billboard)	20
US Top Rap Albums (Billboard)	12
