= Freek Show =

Studio album by Twiztid
- Released: October 31, 2000
- Recorded: 2000
- Genres: Horrorcore; rap metal
- Length: 1:08:25
- Labels: Psychopathic; Island
- Producers: Systasyrosis Soundsquad; Shaggy 2 Dope

Twiztid chronology
| Mostasteless (1998) | Freek Show (2000) | The Green Book (2003) |

Freek Show is the second studio album by American hip hop duo Twiztid. It was released on October 31, 2000 via Psychopathic Records and The Island Def Jam Music Group. Production was handled by Systasyrosis Soundsquad and Shaggy 2 Dope. It features guest appearances from Insane Clown Posse, Blaze Ya Dead Homie, Anybody Killa, Three 6 Mafia and Legz Diamond.

The album debuted at number 51 on the Billboard 200 albums chart in the United States.

A music video was directed for the promotional single "We Don't Die". The song was later used in 2003 video game Backyard Wrestling: Don't Try This at Home, while its music video was included in 2007 DVD compilation Psychopathic: The Videos.

== Music ==
Freek Show is a horrorcore and rap metal album which incorporates elements of other genres into its sound, including techno and pop. "People Are Strange" is a cover version of the 1967 single by the Doors from its Strange Days album.

== Critical reception ==
Professional ratings
Review scores
| Source | Rating |
|---|---|
| AllMusic | 2/5 stars |

AllMusic's Brad Mills wrote that "this kind of music appeals to a small sector of hip-hop listeners and will probably do well within [its] niche market, but the average hip-hop listener will just have to understand that this is a different kind of album". Thomas Quinlan of Exclaim! wrote: "Freek Show is not as good as Twiztid's Mostasteless [sic] debut, but their second outing is a good attempt to match it". In 2014, Rolling Stone writer Nick Murray described "We Don't Die" as "one of turn-of-the-millenium [sic] rap-metal's best tunes".

== Releases ==
Originally released on Halloween 2000, which coincided with Insane Clown Posse's Bizaar and Bizzar albums, Freek Show marks the only Twiztid's album to be released for Island Records.

The album was first re-released with a different cover art subtitled '15th Anniversary Edition' for the 15 Year Freek Show Anniversary Show in Philadelphia in 2015. This 1,000 copies pressed version was sold exclusively during the tour and its leftovers were available on the duo's official website. It was reissued as a limited edition double vinyl LP on March 18, 2016 through Twiztid's own independent record label Majik Ninja Entertainment. On September 12, 2017, it was digitally reissued as a Memory Stick in MP3 format.

In December 2020, Twiztid released a limited edition extended play Freek Show: Disturbed & Unheard (A Celebration of 20 Years) via Majik Ninja Entertainment. The EP is composed of six tracks from the original recordings during the 'Freek Show' sessions.

For Twiztid's 25th anniversary, Majik Ninja Entertainment re-released physical copies of the album in 2023.

== Track listing ==
| No. | Title | Writer(s) | Producer(s) | Length |
|---|---|---|---|---|
| 1. | "Intro" (featuring Legz Diamond) | | Systasyrosis Soundsquad | 1:28 |
| 2. | "Mutant X" | Jamie Spaniolo; Paul Methric | Systasyrosis Soundsquad | 3:03 |
| 3. | "We Don't Die" | Spaniolo; Methric | Systasyrosis Soundsquad | 3:09 |
| 4. | "Fall Apart" | Spaniolo; Methric | Systasyrosis Soundsquad | 4:59 |
| 5. | "Fuckonthe1stdate" | Spaniolo; Methric | Systasyrosis Soundsquad | 3:40 |
| 6. | "Do You Really Know?" | Spaniolo; Methric | Systasyrosis Soundsquad | 3:25 |
| 7. | "Leave Me Alone" | Spaniolo; Methric | Systasyrosis Soundsquad | 3:38 |
| 8. | "People Are Strange" | The Doors | Systasyrosis Soundsquad | 3:13 |
| 9. | "All I Ever Wanted" (featuring Insane Clown Posse) | Spaniolo; Methric; Joseph Bruce; Joseph Utsler | Systasyrosis Soundsquad | 4:18 |
| 10. | "I Wanna Be..." | Spaniolo | Systasyrosis Soundsquad | 1:13 |
| 11. | "Bagz" | Spaniolo; Methric | Systasyrosis Soundsquad | 3:00 |
| 12. | "Wut tha Dead Like" (featuring Insane Clown Posse) | Spaniolo; Methric; Bruce; Utsler | Systasyrosis Soundsquad | 3:59 |
| 13. | "Empty" | Spaniolo; Methric | Systasyrosis Soundsquad | 4:35 |
| 14. | "Where Itz Goin Down" (featuring Three 6 Mafia, Blaze Ya Dead Homie and Anybody Killa) | Spaniolo; Methric; Three 6 Mafia; Chris Rouleau; James Lowery | Systasyrosis Soundsquad | 4:27 |
| 15. | "Broken Wingz" | Spaniolo; Methric | Systasyrosis Soundsquad | 4:30 |
| 16. | "Maniac Killa" (performed by Dark Lotus) | Spaniolo; Methric; Bruce; Utsler; Rouleau | Shaggy 2 Dope; Systasyrosis Soundsquad (add.) | 5:16 |
| 17. | "Different" | Spaniolo; Methric | Systasyrosis Soundsquad | 3:33 |
| 18. | "I'm Alright" | Spaniolo; Methric | Systasyrosis Soundsquad | 6:59 |
| Total length: | | | | 1:08:25 |

Freek Show: Disturbed & Unheard (A Celebration Of 20 Years) EP
| No. | Title | Producer(s) | Length |
|---|---|---|---|
| 1. | "FS-20" | Fritz The Cat |
| 2. | "Track 8" (featuring Legz Diamond) | Fritz The Cat |
| 3. | "All 2gether" | Fritz The Cat |
| 4. | "Leave Me Alone (Toilet $ Mix)" | Fritz The Cat |
| 5. | "Bad Luck Magnet" (featuring Blaze Ya Dead Homie) | Fritz The Cat |
| 6. | "Bagz (Vampirate Mix)" | Fritz The Cat |

== Personnel ==
- Jamie "Madrox" Spaniolo – vocals, producer (tracks: 1–15, 17, 18), additional producer (track 16), recording, mixing, concept
- Paul "Monoxide" Methric – vocals, producer (tracks: 1–15, 17, 18), additional producer (track 16), recording (tracks: 1–9, 11–18), mixing, concept
- Rich "Legz Diamond" Murrell – vocals (track 1)
- Joseph "Violent J" Bruce – vocals & recording (tracks: 8, 12, 16)
- Joseph "Shaggy 2 Dope" Utsler – vocals & recording (tracks: 8, 12, 16), scratches (track 11), producer (track 16)
- Chris "Blaze Ya Dead Homie" Rouleau – vocals & recording (tracks: 14, 16)
- James "Anybody Killa" Lowery – vocals & recording (track 14)
- Three 6 Mafia – vocals & recording (track 14)
- Pickles – additional vocals (track 10)
- Fritz "The Cat" Vankosky – guitars, drums, oboe, pan flute, producer (tracks: 1–15, 17, 18), additional producer (track 16)
- Eric Wheeler – photography
- Gary Arnett – graphics
- Eric Shetler – layout

== Chart history ==
| Chart (2000) | Peak position |
|---|---|
| US Billboard 200 | 51 |
