= The Wraith: Shangri-La =

Studio album by Insane Clown Posse
- Released: November 5, 2002
- Recorded: 2001–02
- Studio: Lotus Pod (Farmington Hills, Michigan)
- Genre: Rap rock
- Length: 64:11
- Labels: Psychopathic Records, D3 Entertainment
- Producer: Mike Puwal

Insane Clown Posse chronology
Bizzar (2000)	The Wraith: Shangri-La (2002)	The Wraith: Hell's Pit (2004)

The Wraith: Shangri-La is the eighth studio album by American hip hop group Insane Clown Posse, released on November 5, 2002, by Psychopathic Records. Recording sessions for the album took place in 2002 at multiple recording studios throughout the United States. The album is the first of two albums representing the sixth Joker's Card in the group's Dark Carnival mythology. The album's lyrics describe the titular Wraith's exhibition of heaven.

The album was the first Insane Clown Posse album that producer Mike E. Clark did not contribute to. It features guest appearances by Jumpsteady, Anybody Killa, Zug Izland, Blaze Ya Dead Homie, Twiztid and Esham. The Wraith: Shangri-La was released in two different versions as well as in DVD-Audio format. It debuted at number 15 on the Billboard charts. It is the 6th Joker Card in the first deck, and the group's 18th overall release.

== Conception ==
=== Background ===
Following a dream by group member Joseph Bruce in which "spirits in a traveling carnival appeared to him," Insane Clown Posse created the mythology of the Dark Carnival in 1992. The Carnival, a metaphoric limbo in which the lives of the dead await to be judged, was planned to be elaborated through a series of stories called Joker's Cards, each of which offers a specific lesson designed to change the "evil ways" of listeners before "the end consumes us all." The group originally planned six Joker's Cards to be released, with the final, "The Wraith", being two separate albums.

At the time of the release of the fifth Joker’s Card, Insane Clown Posse was signed to Island Records. The group did not want to release the sixth Joker’s Card on the label, but were contractually obligated for two more albums. As a result, they released the double album Bizaar and Bizzar (which were not designated Joker's Cards), then left the label. Upon returning to their own label, Psychopathic Records, the duo embarked on the Hatchet Rising Tour in 2001. They returned that November and attempted to begin work on the sixth Joker’s Card. Unable to create the character, members Joseph Bruce and Joseph Utsler went into seclusion to free their minds. The two agreed that their next appearance would be in the following July at the 2002 Gathering of the Juggalos, where they would reveal the Card.

With his free time, Bruce began jogging daily. The exercise helped clear his mind and allow him to focus on the sixth Joker’s Card. He and Utsler brainstormed on the telephone regularly, and the two created the character of the Wraith. In the end, Bruce says, the group knew what the sixth Joker’s Card would be because they've "said it all along. DEATH, and what's after that? Heaven and Hell. One for the true, Shangri-La, and one for the rest, Hell's Pit." The name of the Card, The Wraith, was another name for death itself.

=== Recording ===
From the very first day we started the six-card countdown, we always imagined the 6th being the elite album. We knew that we needed to make that vision become real. We needed to record this at the finest studios we could find in the country, with top-of-the-line mix and sound boards only. […] We had a name, a theme, and a message to tell.

— Joseph Bruce on recording the album

In 2001, Insane Clown Posse built its own studio called "The Lotus Pod" in Farmington Hills, Michigan. After brainstorming in seclusion about the album, the group traveled to recording studios across the United States to produce The Wraith: Shangri-La. They began writing and recording in Dallas, Texas along with Zug Izland and producer Mike Puwal, who offered Insane Clown Posse a sound Bruce described as being more pop-oriented. One night in Dallas, Joseph Bruce was approached by a fan. The fan informed him that a woman that Bruce had slept with had died, but that she had always cherished the night the two spent together. Bruce wrote the song "Welcome to the Show" shortly afterward and made reference to the woman in the lyrics.

After recording several songs in Dallas, Insane Clown Posse and Puwal left and headed to a studio in Las Vegas, Nevada. The song "Hell’s Forecast" was written and inspired by Las Vegas’ hot desert sun. Next, the group traveled to a studio located outside of Nashville, Tennessee. They recorded alongside Anybody Killa and studio band member Rich "Legz Diamond" Murrell. Finally, the group headed home to Detroit. They finished recording at The Lotus Pod, and Puwal finalized the album shortly after. A surround sound mix of the album was prepared by Nathaniel Kunkel and Mike Puwal.

=== Joker's Cards ===
The sixth Joker's Card is "The Wraith", a personification of Death. The card features two "exhibits", Shangri-La (2002) and Hell's Pit (2004), which were each given their own album. The album's final track, "Thy Unveiling", revealed that the hidden message of their music was always to follow God and make it to Heaven. Ben Sisario criticizes the series' ending in the Rolling Stone Album Guide, writing "the whole thing was some bland divine plan [...] Is this man's final dis of God, or His of us?" Some critics perceived the spiritual element of the storyline as a joke or a stunt. Allmusic writer Bradley Torreano wrote that "Even if it is a joke, it isn't a funny one, or even a clever one."

According to Bruce:

"We went on an in-store tour right when the sixth Joker Card came out. It was the most moving thing we ever went through in our lives. All across the country, it had such an effect. People would come to the in-stores crying, thanking us. A very, very emotional time. [...] Some people might've been upset by that, but through our eyes all we did was touch a lot of people. We definitely wanted it to be something everlasting. Maybe a 19-year-old might not understand or like that ending now. But later, when he has four kids, he might think, 'That was the shit.'"

== Release and promotion ==
The image of The Wraith: Shangri-La was first shown at the 2002 musical festival Gathering of the Juggalos. Insane Clown Posse later released The Wraith: Shangri-La Sampler. The four track sampler concentrated on the group's history and contained a seminar that they held at the 2002 event. On November 4, 2002, the day before the release of The Wraith: Shangri-La, 10 release parties were held by Psychopathic Records nationwide. The next day, eight more release parties were held nationwide. Hosts of the parties included Twiztid, Anybody Killa, Juggalo Championship Wrestling wrestlers Rude Boy and Sabu, and Insane Clown Posse.

The Wraith: Shangri-La was released in two compact disc editions, one with a bonus DVD featuring a seminar from the 2002 Gathering of the Juggalos, and the other featuring a live concert performance. The album was also released on DVD-Audio format with the surround sound mix. In 2003, Insane Clown Posse went on the 75-date Shangri-La World Tour, where the group performed across the United States, Australia and Europe.

== Reception ==
Professional ratings
Review scores
Source	Rating
AllMusic	2/5 stars
Blender	3/5 stars
Drowned in Sound	4/10
Martin Charles Strong	4/10 stars
Rolling Stone	2/5 stars

The Wraith: Shangri-La debuted at number 15 on the Billboard 200 and number one on the Top Independent Albums chart. In 2003, the surround sound mix was named "Most Adventurous Mix" at the second annual Surround Music Awards. In The Great Rock Discography, Martin Charles Strong gave the album four out of ten stars. The album received two stars out of five in The New Rolling Stone Album Guide.

In September 2003, Insane Clown Posse was voted the worst band of any musical genre in Blender, with The Wraith: Shangri-La named as the group's worst album. Despite describing Insane Clown Posse as "imbecilic white rappers", the magazine complimented the album for its "charming, good-natured idiocy."

By 2010, the album had become eligible for gold certification by the Recording Industry Association of America.

== Legacy ==
The image of the Wraith from the Shangri-La album cover was used on a flight test patch for the Lockheed Martin Skunk Works' Black Ops Desert Prowler program. The patch features the Wraith, with added red eyes, surrounded by six stars with the words "Desert Prowler, Alone and on the Prowl."

On May 26, 2017 it was announced that Insane Clown Posse would be performing the album in its entirety at the 2017 Gathering of the Juggalos. Some of the album's featured artists, namely Twiztid, Blaze Ya Dead Homie and Esham, did not perform.

== Track listing ==
No.	Title	Lyrics	Music	Performer(s)	Length
1.	"Walk into the Light"	Jumpsteady, Violent J and Shaggy 2 Dope	Mike Puwal	Jumpsteady, Mike Puwal, Violent J and Shaggy 2 Dope	5:11
2.	"Welcome to the Show"	ICP	Mike Puwal	ICP and Mike Puwal	3:12
3.	"Get Ya Wicked On"	ICP	Mike Puwal	ICP and Mike Puwal	1:47
4.	"Murder Rap"	ICP	Mike Puwal and Above the Law	ICP and Mike Puwal	2:32
5.	"Birthday Bitches"	ICP and Anybody Killa	Mike Puwal	ICP, Mike Puwal and Anybody Killa	1:18
6.	"Blaaam!!!"	ICP	Mike Puwal	ICP, Mike Puwal and Lil' Pig	3:39
7.	"It Rains Diamonds/Bitch Slappaz" (featuring Blaze Ya Dead Homie)	ICP and Blaze Ya Dead Homie	Mike Puwal	ICP, Anybody Killa, Jumpsteady, Mike Puwal and Blaze Ya Dead Homie	5:26
8.	"The Staleness"	ICP	Mike Puwal	ICP, Mike Puwal, Syn, Legs Diamond and Lil' Pig	3:58
9.	"Hell's Forecast"	ICP	Mike Puwal	ICP and Mike Puwal	2:58
10.	"Homies" (featuring Twiztid and Anybody Killa)	ICP, Twiztid and Anybody Killa	Mike Puwal	ICP, Twiztid, Anybody Killa, Mike Puwal, Syn and Lil' Pig	4:32
11.	"Ain't Yo Bidness/Soopa Villains" (featuring Esham)	ICP and Esham	Mike Puwal	ICP, Syn, Mike Puwal and Esham	4:49
12.	"We Belong"	ICP	Mike Puwal	ICP, Anybody Killa and Mike Puwal	2:44
13.	"Cotton Candy & Popsicles" (featuring Zug Izland)	ICP	Zug Izland	ICP and Zug Izland	3:42
14.	"Crossing the Bridge"	ICP	Mike Puwal	ICP, Mike Puwal and Lil' Pig	4:14
15.	"The Raven's Mirror"	ICP	Mike Puwal	ICP, Legs Diamond and Mike Puwal	2:59
16.	"The Wraith"	ICP	Mike Puwal	ICP and Mike Puwal	3:33
17.	"The Unveiling"	ICP	Mike Puwal	ICP, Lil' Pig, Anybody Killa, Legs Diamond, Syn, Mike Puwal and Blaze Ya Dead Homie	7:37
Total length:					64:11

The Wraith: Shangri-La Sampler
No.	Title	Length
1.	"Simple and Blunt"	3:43
2.	"Knock 2 Dis Mix"	2:10
3.	"Juggalo Chant"	4:05
4.	"ICP Seminar" (From GOTJ 2002)"	50:47
Total length:		60:45

Notes

- Every song with "the" in the title has been written out as "thy", for example, "Walk into the Light" is written as "Walk into thy Light".

== Samples ==
- "Murder Rap" samples "Straight Outta Compton" by N.W.A
- "It Rains Diamonds" samples "Compton's N The House (Remix)" by N.W.A
- "Cotton Candy & Popsicles" samples "Bring the Noise" by Public Enemy and "Bathtub" by Snoop Dogg

== Personnel ==
Vocals

- Violent J – Liner Notes, Vocals
- Shaggy 2 Dope – Vocals
- Anybody Killa – Vocals
- Blaze Ya Dead Homie – Vocals
- Esham – Arranger, Producer, Vocals
- Jumpsteady – Vocals
- Rich “Legz Diamond” Murrell – Vocals
- Lil Pig – Drums, Vocals
- Twiztid – Vocals
- Zug Izland – Vocals

Other personnel

- Gary Arnett – Graphic Design, Image Editing
- Tom Baker – Mastering
- William Charley – Image Editing
- Mike Puwal – Engineer

== Chart positions ==
=== Weekly charts ===
Chart (2002)	Peak position
Australian Albums (ARIA Charts)	71
Billboard 200	15
Top Independent Albums	1
Canadian Albums Chart	36

Chart (2003)	Peak Position
Top Independent Albums	1

=== Year-end charts ===
Chart (2002)	Position
Canadian Rap Albums (Nielsen SoundScan)	78
