= Psychopathic Records =

American independent record label

- Founded: 1991
- Founder: Insane Clown Posse &; Alex Abbiss
- Distributors: RED Distribution; (2002–2009) (2015–2018); InGrooves/Fontana; (2010–2014); Epitaph; (2001), (In Europe 2004–); ADA; (2019–)
- Genre: Horrorcore; rap rock
- Country of origin: United States
- Location: Farmington Hills, Michigan
- Official website: www.psychopathicrecords.com

Psychopathic Records is an American independent record label headquartered in Farmington Hills, Michigan. The label is most associated with the hip-hop music subgenres horrorcore and rap rock. The label was founded in 1991 by Alex Abbiss and hip hop group Insane Clown Posse. The iconography of a man with a meat cleaver has been used for years as a symbol of the group, its fanbase, and its associates.

In addition to producing music, Psychopathic also produces merchandise, video, and professional wrestling. Psychopathic runs its own manufacturing and distribution operations for merchandise, with nearly 30 full-time employees. In 2009–2010, the label had about $10 million in annual revenue. The recording studio for the label was called The Lotus Pod.

== History ==
=== Establishment (1991–1994) ===
Following the release of their 1991 EP Bass-Ment Cuts, Detroit hip hop trio Inner City Posse, consisting of Violent J, Shaggy 2 Dope, and John Kickjazz (John Utsler), hired local record store owner Alex Abbiss as its manager. Taking the advice of Violent J's brother, Jumpsteady, the group and Abbiss agreed to create their own label. After debating between the names Mad Paperboy Records and Psychopathic Records, they decided on Psychopathic and the label soon started operating out of Abbiss's mother's basement. A drawing Joseph Utsler scribbled on a napkin, now known as the Hatchet Man, became the company's logo.

Inner City Posse released their first professionally recorded album, Dog Beats, on the label later that year. Shortly after, the group underwent a change in style, look, and name to become Insane Clown Posse, and created the Dark Carnival concept that would be continued by much of the label's other artists for years to come. Esham and Kid Rock were paid to appear on the debut "Insane Clown Posse" album to increase the album's marketability. The group and their label began to gain moderate popularity in the Detroit area following the releases of Carnival of Carnage and Beverly Kills 50187, as well as through their extensive amount of independent promoting. Months before the release of Carnival of Carnage John Kickjazz left the group. Not wanting to show weakness early in the game, they replaced him with friend and fan Greez-e (Erik Olson). Greez-e's membership was short-lived, however; after appearing on Beverly Kills 50187, he left the group. ICP has remained a duo ever since.

=== Expansion and change (1994–2000) ===
Mike E. Clark was selected as the label's core producer, with his recording studio, The Fun House being the main studio. On March 8, 1994, Insane Clown Posse released Ringmaster, which sold 40,000 copies independently by the summer. Later that year, Project Born was the first outside act signed to Psychopathic Records with the belief that they would become "the next Dayton Family". The group's debut album, Born Dead, received minimal sales, and they were subsequently dropped from the label in 1995.

Insane Clown Posse signed a record deal with Battery/Jive Records in 1995 but left the label the following year after it poorly promoted their new album, the Riddle Box. In 1995, ICP and friends created a group to keep ICP busy until the release of Riddle Box, and called themselves Golden Goldies. Golden Goldies was a comical group whose lyrics focused solely on gold. The group consisted of Psychopathic Records employees and friends. Their only LP, Gimme Them Fuckin' Nuggets Bitch, Or I'll Punch Your Fuckin' Face, was recorded in 1995 in a span of one week and was not publicly released. Golden Goldies was put together for entertainment purposes only. To add more humor to the album, each artist was given only five minutes to write their verses, and had only one take to record them, which resulted in some artists messing up their lines, and lyrics containing "some very strange things." The group held only one live performance, which occurred at the record release party for Insane Clown Posse's Riddle Box. The group consisted of: Golden Jelly (Joseph Bruce), Gold D (Joseph Utsler), Golden Gram (Robert Bruce), Gold Double B (Billy Bill), Gold Rocks (Alex Abbiss), Gold Digger (Mike E. Clark), Golden Warrior (Rich Murrell), Golden Frank (Frank G), Gold Teeth (Keith) Rold Gold (Josh), Gold Spud (Kelly Eubanks), Golden Toby (Fink the East Side G) and Gold Spakalantie (Matt Mackalantie). One day after the group left Jive and one day before it signed with Hollywood Records, Insane Clown Posse released Tunnel of Love on its Psychopathic label. The group released The Great Milenko in 1997 but were notified that Hollywood Records had deleted the album within hours of its release, despite having sold 18,000 copies and reaching number 63 on the Billboard 200. The removal caused a public controversy, creating major mainstream coverage of the group and their Psychopathic label.

In 1997, the label signed Myzery and former members of the House of Krazees Jamie Spaniolo and Paul Methric. Taking the name of Twiztid, Spaniolo and Methric created the identities of Jamie Madrox and Monoxide Child, and released their first album, Mostasteless, that year. Insane Clown Posse, Twiztid, Myzery, and Blaze also formed the supergroup Psychopathic Rydas, and created Joe & Joey Records to release the group's albums to avoid any lawsuits. Myzery soon left the label after releasing the EP Para La Isla.

Later that year, Island Records bought the rights of The Great Milenko from Hollywood Records and signed Insane Clown Posse and Twiztid to their label. Island also helped Psychopathic Records expand into the movie business by funding Insane Clown Posse US$250,000 to begin work on a full-length movie, Big Money Hustlas, written by Violent J. The film was released through Island Def Jam Music Group, Psychopathic Video, and Non-Homogenized Productions on July 18, 2000. In 2001 they were the first record label/music group to do a tour showing their own movie in concert venues across the US.

Following their success in WWF, WCW, and ECW, Insane Clown Posse founded the professional wrestling promotion Juggalo Championship Wrestling in 1999 and created the Psychopathic Sports department. In July 2000, Psychopathic Records staged the first annual Gathering of the Juggalos (GOTJ) at the Novi Expo Center in Novi, Michigan. Described by Bruce as a "Juggalo Woodstock", the Gathering of the Juggalos drew over 7,000 people to Novi, Michigan, for the two day event. Both Insane Clown Posse and Twiztid permanently returned to Psychopathic later that year; the label soon built its own recording studio, named The Lotus Pod. Twiztid released the album Freek Show, which debuted number 51 on Billboard 200.

=== Steady production (2001–2004) ===
In 2001, the supergroup Dark Lotus debuted, consisting of Jamie Madrox, Monoxide Child, Violent J, Shaggy 2 Dope, Blaze Ya Dead Homie, and non-Psychopathic artist Marz. Later that year, Anybody Killa was signed to the label. While also working on his own album, Hatchet Warrior, Killa replaced Marz in Dark Lotus for a short period. Detroit rapper Esham, whom Violent J considered to be an influence, also signed with Psychopathic Records for a large contract; he released a greatest hits album, Acid Rain, the following year.

Jumpsteady released his debut EP Chaos Theory in 2002. At that year's Gathering of the Juggalos, rapper V-Sinizter won an MC Contest and was awarded a one-year contract with Psychopathic Records. On November 5, Insane Clown Posse released their sixth Joker's Card, The Wraith: Shangri-La, which debuted at No. 15 on the Billboard 200. V-Sinizter released Hunting Season in 2003, but was soon released by the label due to minimal sale.

=== Ax & Smash Records (2002–2004) ===
Later that year, alternative rock group Zug Izland was signed and quickly released Cracked Tiles on January 28, 2003. They released their last album on the label, titled 3:33 on June 1, 2004. The label closed after Zug Izland left.

=== Continued releases (2005–2007) ===
After releasing Master of the Flying Guillotine in 2005, Jumpsteady retired from music to become an EMT in the metro Detroit area.

That summer, the two supergroups Soopa Villainz and Drive-By were created. The first, consisting of Mr. Diamond (Violent J), Mr. Club (Shaggy 2 Dope), Mr. Spade (Esham), and Mr. Heart (Lavel), released Furious in August. The latter, consisting of Blaze and Anybody Killa, released Pony Down (Prelude) in October. Although Esham had achieved his highest level of success at Psychopathic, he left the label that month to reform his own label, Reel Life Productions, and the group Soopa Villainz was disbanded. Anybody Killa left the following February. Later that year, Psychopathic Records and hip hop group D12, representing Eminem, ended their rivalry by holding a bowling match.

In April, Axe Murder Boyz won a single album contract with Psychopathic Records and released Blood In, Blood Out before being released from the label. That June, Alex Abbiss announced his retirement. Long time body guard and friend of Insane Clown Posse William Dail, referred to as Billy Bill, was named new president and CEO of Psychopathic Records. Later that month, the label launched its own internet radio station called WFuckOff Radio. Boondox signed with the label at that year's Gathering of the Juggalos, becoming the first southern rapper on the label. Boondox was a Psychopathic Records favorite in the Underground Psychos contest who was voted out by the jugglaos in the second round. His name in the contest was "Turn Coat Dirty".

=== Hatchet House (since 2007) ===
In 2007, the third former member of "House of Krazees" The R.O.C. signed with newly created Psychopathic sub-label, Hatchet House.

=== More signings to PSY and HH (2008–2012) ===
In 2008, Anybody Killa re-signed with Psychopathic. That May, the label hosted the first annual "Hatchet Attacks". Axe Murder Boyz signed with Hatchet House on August 22. At the 2008 Gathering of the Juggalos, a documentary on Juggalos, entitled A Family Underground, was filmed; it was released on May 12, 2009.

On February 17, 2010, Psychopathic Records signed a contract with Universal Music Group's Fontana Distribution. During this period, the label was nominated for Outstanding Local Record Label by Detroit Music Awards. In Blaze's Gang Rags album The Dayton Family was shown to appear courtesy of Hatchet House.

Vanilla Ice and Cold 187um signed with Psychopathic Records in 2011.

On January 3, 2012, WFuckOff Radio was rebranded as Psychopathic Radio. During the 2012 Gathering of the Juggalos, it was announced that both former acts Zug Izland and Jumpsteady have returned to Psychopathic Records. Boondox and Twiztid left the label. The December 21, 2012, issue of Hatchet Herald indicates that two new artists will issue albums on the label in 2013.

=== Expansion (2013–2014) ===
On February 4, 2013, it was revealed that one of the new artists was Legz Diamond. An entire issue of Hatchet Herald was devoted to the guitarist, discussing his Psychopathic debut album, 9 Pistolas. In March, Violent J commented on Twiztid's departure revealing that there was no animosity between Twiztid and Psychopathic, and speculated that Blaze Ya Dead Homie had also left the label, but that Twiztid and Blaze were still a part of Dark Lotus and Psychopathic Rydas. Blaze later spoke openly about the subject during a concert, stating that he had not departed from Psychopathic. Insane Clown Posse publicly apologized to Blaze via Twitter for the misunderstanding.

Doe Dubbla, a rapper from Detroit, officially signed to Psychopathic in June 2013, under the alias Big Hoodoo. In July, Psychopathic released Big Hoodoo's debut, Crystal Skull, Cold 187 um departed from the label At the 2013 Gathering of the Juggalos, it was confirmed that Axe Murder Boyz and Boondox are returning to Psychopathic, while Blaze Ya Dead Homie ended up leaving Psychopathic Records.

A former employee is suing the label for sexual harassment.

In early February 2014, Faygoluvers.net conducted an interview with Insane Clown Posse, and they said that they hope they will work with some artists that they have been wanting to work with for a while. Also they were asked if they were going to do the second leg of The Mighty Death Pop! Tour, and they said that they will go on tour in 2014 but it would not be called The Mighty Death Pop! Tour. During an interview in March 2014 DJ Paul of Da Mafia 6ix announced that they will be doing a collaboration album with Insane Clown Posse, and will tour to promote the album. In June 2014 Psychopathic Records announced that Insane Clown Posse and Da Mafia 6ix were working on a collaboration album, and Insane Clown Posse posted pictures on their official Instagram page of them and Da Mafia 6ix sitting around in Violent J's home studio. The album is scheduled to be released sometime in August 2014. A few days after Faygoluvers.net conducted the interview with Insane Clown Posse, Psychopathic Records, Insane Clown Posse, Twiztid and Blaze Ya Dead Homie released a picture of the Dark Lotus hand sign stating that all original members (Insane Clown Posse, Twiztid and Blaze Ya Dead Homie) were going to be back in the studio recording a new studio album on all their media outlets. Under the hand sign were Roman numerals translating to (7-29-2014). The album will initially be released at the 2014 GOTJ (July 23, 2014 – July 27, 2014). In June 2014 Insane Clown Posse announced that they will be releasing their first box set The First Six with all first six Joker Cards (Carnival of Carnage, Ringmaster, Riddle Box, The Great Milenko, The Amazing Jeckel Brothers, The Wraith: Shangri-La/The Wraith: Hell's Pit), along with a certification of authenticity signed by Violent J and Shaggy 2 Dope, six tarot cards, and an eight-song EP of all new music titled House of Wax, that will be released on October 28, 2014. In a July 6, 2014, interview Faygoluvers.net conducted with Jumpsteady, he stated that Psychopathic is currently working with some new supergroups. During Anybody Killa's seminar at the 2014 GOTJ, it was announced that he and Big Hoodoo have created a new group called The Have Nots. Insane Clown Posse have composed a group with Da Mafia 6ix called The Killjoy Club, and will be releasing their debut album titled Reindeer Games on September 2, 2014. ICP, DM6, Madchild, Jelly Roll and Mushroom Head plus others are to go on tour possibly titled "ShockFest" which will run from September 18, 2014 – October 31, 2014. ICP finally announced that they will release a Psypher featuring artists that are not signed to Psychopathic Records sometime before Hallowicked, including Madchild. Also announced Otis of AMB and DJ Paul will both release solo albums on Psychopathic records in 2015. On August 5, 2014, ICP released a promo flyer for their upcoming tour titled "ShockFest" with Da Mafia 6ix, Mushroomhead, Madchild and Jelly Roll from September 30, 2014, through October 31, 2014. The tour was originally scheduled to be a 45-date tour, and scheduled to kick off on September 18, 2014, but due to Madchild performing in Australia with his group Swollen Members for a mini tour until September 27, 2014, the tour will now kick off on September 30, 2014, Columbus, Ohio, and will conclude on ICP's 21st annual Hallowicked concert on October 31, 2014, in Detroit, Michigan. Psychopathic Records released a video promo for "ShockFest" in early August 2014. The tour is now scheduled to run from September 25, 2014, in Grand Rapids, Michigan, and will conclude on October 31, 2014, in Detroit. In the booklet released with the Reindeer Games album were four flyers in promotion of new albums. The first was for Insane Clown Posse, it said that the third Joker Card in the second Deck will be released "sooner than you think". The second was for Otis, it said that his debut solo album on Psychopathic will be titled Slaughter and it said that it too will be released "soon". The third was for DJ Paul, it said that his debut solo album on Psychopathic will be titled Master Of Evil and it said that it too will be released "soon". The fourth was for Da Mafia 6ix, it was for their upcoming album titled "Watch What U Wish" which will be released on October 31, 2014, not on Psychopathic Records. In early October 2014 it was announced that "Watch What U Wish" will be pushed back to a 2015 release creating speculation that Psychopathic will release the album. Instead DM6 will release a mixxtape titled "Hear Some Evil" in October 2014. The First Six was initially scheduled to be released on October 28, 2014; after a minor setback, it released on November 25, 2014. At the 2014 20th Hallowicked Anniversary, ICP revealed the third Joker Card in the second Deck which is broken up into two parts: The Missing Link: Lost, which will be released on Violent J's 43rd birthday (April 28, 2015) and The Missing Link: Found will be released July 28, 2015. On December 6, 2014, at the show in Topeka, Kansas, Tha Hav Knots a group composed of Anybody Killa and Big Hoodoo released their first-ever debut track titled "Happy Wicked Holiday", a Christmas-themed single. During ABK's set during the tour they opened with their first official song titled "Don't Stop", no studio version of the song has been released, and ended with "Happy Wicked Holiday".

=== Releases and other happenings (2015–2016) ===
Psychopathic Records artist Boondox will be going on tour with Majik Ninja Entertainment artist Blaze Ya Dead Homie on MNE's first tour and the first "Psychopathic/Majik Ninja Entertainmen Tour" titled "Back From The Dead Tour", which kicks off February 14, 2015, which coincides with Twiztid's "My Bloody Valentine Show". In the booklet for Insane Clown Posse's The Marvelous Missing Link: Lost it was announced that Otis's debut solo album titled Slaughter will be released September 1, 2015. The second "Psychopathic Records/Majik Ninja Entertainment Tour" will be with Boondox from Psychopathic Records, and former Psychopathic Records artist Blaze Ya Dead Homie from Majik Ninja Entertainment. It will also be Majik Ninja Entertainment's third tour, and their first in Australia. The tour will take place in Australia, will be called The Underground Assault Tour and will feature Australian rapper KidCrusher. The tour will take place June 25, 2015, through June 28, 2015. The third Psychopathic Records/Majik Ninja Entertainment Tour will take place in the fall of 2015 with Twiztid, Blaze Ya Dead Homie, Boondox, Prozak, Wolfpac and Scum, and will be called the Welcome To The Underground Tour. On July 24, 2015, during ICP's GOTJ seminar, it was announced that Boondox had left the label to sign with Majik Ninja Entertainment, which turned out to be a false flag as Boondox had chosen to branch out on his own.

On February 21, 2016, in celebration of the Juggalo Day Show, ICP released the dates for their 20th Anniversary: Riddle Box Tour. The tour was scheduled to kick off on May 5, 2016, and was slated to conclude on June 18, 2016. On April 8, 2016, ICP released their tour dates for their Canada tour. The tour was scheduled to kick off on June 25, 2016, and to conclude on July 17, 2016, just in time for the GOTJ, which was to start on July 20, 2016. In an early April 2016 Faygoluvers.net interview with Violent J, J said that the possible acts being talked about for Riddle Box Tour are: Esham, Project Born, The Dayton Family, and Young Wicked. Also stated was that he and Shaggy are working on their solo albums. In the same interview it was announced that Young Wicked has a new project revolving around him coming out soon. On April 25, 2016, via Twitter, Young Wicked announced that he is on the 20th Anniversary: Riddle Box Tour. It was also announced via The 17th annual Gathering of the Juggalos infomercial that the label has a new artist that they will be announcing at Gathering 17 along with a new six-song EP from this new "discovery" that will be available at the event. Also it was stated that many people will find out what group they used to rap with and who they used to go by. ICP will go on their first Canadian Tour for the first time in 13 years. The tour is scheduled to kick off on June 24, 2016, at the Canadian Rockfest, and concluded on July 17, 2016. During Insane Clown Posse's GOTJ 2016 seminar it was announced that Shaggy 2 Dope will make his wrestling return on August 2, 2016, at the Pro Wrestling Syndicate show in New Jersey. Also announced was that work on the third film in the Big Money film series titled Big Money Thru$ta$ had begun, and with no definite release date, Violent J said "maybe in the next two years". It was also stated that a new The Killjoy Club album may be out in November 2016. With Juicy J reuniting with DJ Paul and Crunchy Black to reform Three 6 Mafia it is unknown if he will join The Killjoy Club. The second leg of Insane Clown Posse's "20th Anniversary: Riddle Box Tour" will feature sets from Anybody Killa, Big Hoodoo and Blahzay Roze. "Juggalo Day Show 2017" will take place in Florida and will feature sets from Insane Clown Posse, Twiztid, Blaze Ya Dead Homie and Dark Lotus will perform the Tales from the Lotus Pod album in its entirety. The "Canadian Juggalo Day Show 2017" will take place on March 17, 2017, and will feature performances from the entire Psychopathic Records roster as well as performances from Twiztid and Blaze Ya Dead Homie. Also it was announced that the 2017 Gathering of the Juggalos will take place in Denver, Colorado, and there is a possibility of a Soopa Villainz reunion. Also a documentary on former Insane Clown Posse member and Shaggy 2 Dope's older brother John Kickjazz, and another documentary on Axe Murder Boyz member Young Wicked will be out in 2017. Shaggy 2 Dope's upcoming album F.T.F.O.M.F. is now scheduled to be released in 2017. Finally it was announced that on September 17, 2017, there will be a "Juggalo March on Washington" in Washington DC and will be a two-day event which will begin at Lincoln Memorial and will end at Washington Monument with speeches. The only confirmed artists so far is the roster from Psychopathic Records; however, any artists that has performed at the Gathering or is associated with the juggalos or whoever truly supports the family, should attend as well to support the movement. In the November 17, 2016, edition of the hatchet herald it was announced that Psychopathic Records new in-house engineer is Native World Inc.'s own artist Str8Jaket, and he is currently working with the new artist on the label. In late November 2016 it was said that a new Psychopathic Psypher titled "If We Were A Gang" would be released on January 1, 2017, with an accompanying music video. It was also stated that with the speculation of who is on or not on Psychopathic Records, the Psypher will feature all artists currently on the label. Also a website for the Juggalo March on Washington will be up on January 1, 2017. On the December 22, 2016, edition of Psychopathic Radio, Violent J stated that over 200 acts have been invited to the march. He also stated that on the website one can view each invitation (invitations were created specifically for each individual artist) and if the artist accepts (a yellow diamond will appear) or if the artist declines (a red x will appear). Violent J also stated that for each artist that accepts they will be sent an audio clip and will record a 16 bar verse, and then will record it and shoot a video for their verse, for a special cypher that will be released aside from "If We Were A Gang". On December 31, 2016, at 3:00 pm EST it was announced that Young Wicked of Axe Murder Boyz has left Psychopathic Records and has signed with Majik Ninja Entertainment.

=== New roster and plans (since 2017) ===
On January 1, 2017, it was announced that Lyte formerly known as Young Lyte was the new artist on the label. Also the same day the free downloadable song "Hurricane Of Diamonds" featuring Insane Clown Posse, Anybody Killa, DJ Clay, Big Hoodoo, Blahzay Roze and Lyte was released. On January 19, 2017, in an interview with faygoluvers.net, Insane Clown Posse announced that they were cutting ties with Twiztid and Majik Ninja Entertainment, as they had repeatedly declined invitations to the Juggalo March on Washington, and the alternative to not march, going on a Wizard of the Hood Tour, which they also declined. Also in doing so, Insane Clown Posse stated that Psychopathic Records will stop reaching out to Twiztid and Majik Ninja Entertainment for Juggalo Day and the Gathering of the Juggalos. Also during the interview it was announced that new music will come from Insane Clown Posse, DJ Clay, Big Hoodoo, Blahzay Roze, Lyte and a new group that includes Insane Clown Posse, as everyone on the label recently signed a new three-album deal with the label. It was also stated that since the March 2016 interview, a lot more about of the new Joker Card (4th Card, 2nd Deck), but is not ready to be revealed yet, but Violent J did state that it will be released in 2018. Albums set for a 2017 release is F.T.F.O.M.F. from Shaggy 2 Dope, American Life/Lives from Violent J, My Life from Blahzay Roze, and the debut album from Lyte, and more to be announced. On January 26, 2017, the title of Lytes debut album Broke But Shining. On February 20, 2017, the psypher If We Were A Gang was released and featured Anybody Killa, Lyte, Shaggy 2 Dope, Big Hoodoo, Blahzay Roze, DJ Clay, Violent J. On February 26, 2017, it was announced that artist Blahzay Roze has left Psychopathic Records. On September 6, 2017, at ICP's Surprize Guerrilla Show it was announced that one half of the underground hip-hop duo "Swag Toof" by the name of Ouija Macc was signed to Psychopathic Records.

On February 25, 2018, Violent J took to Twitter to announce that the Hurricane Of Diamonds CD would be available during the SlamFest Tour (March 1, 2018, through April 1, 2018) with Attila, Sylar, Cage, Lil Toenail, Lyte, Ouija, and would be available in a few weeks (middle of March 2018) on Psychopaticmerch.com. It was also said that the CD would feature 17 tracks in total, with songs that had music videos made for them in 2017, also with at least 13 being never released on CD before, and three being brand new, unheard Insane Clown Posse songs. During Insane Clown Posse's 2018 Gathering of the Juggalos seminar, it was announced that Fearless Fred Fury would be released on October 26, 2018, and also Flip The Rat EP would be released the same day, with instructions on how to obtain the EP inside of FFF. It was also announced that any reconciliation in any way with Twiztid, or a Dark Lotus reunion, will not happen in any way, with Violent J saying, "It'll be that way in five years, and will still be that way in ten years. Sorry Juggalos, but we wanted to address it upfront for anybody holding out hope that it might happen, but it's not". It was also announced that the Bloody Brothers, (a concept that featured Violent J and Shaggy 2 Dope as backwoods, serial killing hillbillies, that was later used as the Boondox gimmick), would be happening soon, as well as other alter ego albums, with ICP saying "We've come up with a lot of gimmick ideas that were used for other artists, but we're not doing that anymore, if we come up with it and want to use it as a project of ours, that's what we're gonna do". It was also revealed that a new supergroup was on the label called The Loony Goons and features Insane Clown Posse, Big Hoodoo, Lyte and Ouija Macc. It was also announced that TLG will begin recording their debut album after they return to Detroit after the GOTJ. Violent J stated "The album will have something you'd hear in 1985, and the next track will be something you'd hear in 2019". During Lyte and Ouija Macc's seminar they were asked if they were doing a Lil Rydas album. They then asked the crowd if they want it, with a positive response they said to expect it in 2019. Since ICP announced that they were going back to do other supergroups that they had pushed aside, during their 2018 GOTJ Seminar, rumors have been circulating that a group that was created in 2003 called Planned Panic (which featured Insane Clown Posse, Anybody Killa and Tech N9ne), could make an appearance with an EP, or a couple song set at the 2018 Hallowicked Show. On October 21, 2020, ICP confirmed during the 2020 Psychopathic Don Shoot Interview that the only artists on the label are them and Ouija Macc. The CD booklet of Insane Clown Posse's 2021 album Yum Yum Bedlam referred to the horrorcore rapper Zitro as "the newest member of the Psychopathic Records Family." However, there has been no announcement of him being officially signed to the label.

== Artists ==
=== Current ===
| Artist | Year signed | Description |
|---|---|---|
| Insane Clown Posse | Since 1991 | Composed of members Violent J and Shaggy 2 Dope, the two are co-founders and owners of Psychopathic Records. Then known as Inner City Posse, the group released the label's first album, Dog Beats, in 1991. The duo has earned two platinum and three gold albums along with two platinum movies and a gold movie, and has sold over 6.5 million units in the United States and Canada as of April 2007. Both members also occasionally act as solo artists and have released their own solo albums. Violent J has released three while Shaggy 2 Dope has released two. Violent J has released two on Psychopathic, and Shaggy 2 Dope has released both of his on Psychopathic as well. |
| Soopa Villainz | 2002–2005 and since 2018 | Soopa Villainz was composed of Insane Clown Posse (Mr. Club and Mr. Diamond), Esham (Mr. Spade), and Lavel (Mr. Heart). The group released their only studio album, Furious, in 2005. After a fight between label mates, Esham and Lavel left the group and Psychopathic Records. After the group disbanded, members Esham and Lavel released a second album live on Esham's web podcast, called It Aint Safe No More. During ICP's set at the 2018 GOTJ, they dropped a banner for a SV reunion. On October 31, 2019, they released the Hallowicked VIP single "Ricochet". |
| Bloody Brothers | 2005 and since 2018 | In 2005, Violent J and Shaggy 2 Dope came up with the concept of 2 backwoods, serial killing hillbillies called The Bloody Brothers, but later met, signed, and used the gimmick for Boondox. During Insane Clown Posse's 2018 Gathering of the Juggalos seminar, it was announced that they would in fact be doing The Bloody Brothers concept and would be recording it soon. It was also announced that after coming up with many other gimmicks that were used for other artists, they said "After doing that, we've decided that if we come up with a concept that we want to use as a project of ours, we are gonna do it". Their debut album titled The Bloody Brothers was set to be released in 2021 but never came out. On March 10, 2022, Bloody Brothers officially released the single "After Murder Sunrise" for free to people that were subscribed to their Patreon page in June 2021. |
| Ouija Macc | Since 2017 | In the January 19, 2017 Faygoluvers fan site interview with Insane Clown Posse, the ICP announced that they are going to have a new act on the label in 2017. On January 20, 2017, the flyer for the 2017 Juggalo Day Show: The Amazing Jeckel Brothers was released, and said Day 1 (February 16, 2017) will feature the Psychopathic Records Family Roster (T.B.A., Sewerside, Lyte, Anybody Killa, Kottonmouth Kings and Insane Clown Posse). On October 4, 2017, at the "Surprize Guerilla Show" the music video for the new psypher "Juggalo Love" was filmed and the announcement was made that the newest artist on the label was former Swag Toof member Ouija Macc. His debut album titled Gutterwater was released on May 25, 2018. |
| 3 Headed Monster | Since 2023 | 3 Headed Monster is composed of Violent J, Esham & Ouija Macc. They released their debut album titled Obliteration on June 1, 2023 and their sophomore album Rampage on September 13, 2023. |
| Wakko The Kidd | Since 2026 | |

=== Former ===
| Artist | Year signed | Albums Released | Description |
|---|---|---|---|
| Project Born | 1994–1996 | 1 | Project Born signed to Psychopathic in 1994 off the strength of a demo album. Impressed with the demo, ICP and Psychopathic decided to release it as was. Unfortunately, the demo recording was lost, leading to Project Born having to record a new album, which according to Violent J, was inferior to the original. They named it the Born Dead EP and released it in 1995. After the release of Born Dead, Project Born was released from Psychopathic due to minimal sales. Since then they still play at the Gatherings and collaborate time to time. |
| V-Sinizter | 2002–2003 | 1 | V-Sinizter won a one-year deal with Psychopathic Records in 2002. He released his debut Psychopathic album, the Hunting Season EP, in 2003. After its release and low sales, V-Sinizter was released from Psychopathic. He went on to sign to Area 51 records, making a few more albums. |
| Esham | 2002–2005 | 3 | Esham signed to Psychopathic in 2002 while his brother and co-owner of his record label were in jail. He released three albums on Psychopathic, and saw his highest point of success. After a fight between label mates and the release of his brother, Esham left Psychopathic Records. He has since done a few songs with Psychopathic Records including with ICP, DJ Clay, and Mike E. Clark. He has released none since 2009, after he left ICP and Psychopathic Records. Esham performed with ICP at the "Ringmaster" Juggalo Day Show on February 20, 2016. In an April 8, 2016, during a faygoluvers fan site interview with Violent J, it was said that ICP and Esham had patched things up, and that Esham will produce some ICP projects. Announced in the 2016 GOTJ promo video, it was announced that Esham will perform at the 2016 Gathering of the Juggalos. |
| Drive-By | 2001–2006; 2007–2012 | 2 | Composed of Anybody Killa and Blaze Ya Dead Homie, Drive-By signed to Psychopathic Records in early 2005. They released their debut CD, the Ponydown EP, in October 2005. The group disbanded after ABK left Psychopathic in 2006. Drive-By re-released Ponydownthe (prelude) EP in July 2008, after ABK returned to the label. After Blaze left Psychopathic the future of Drive-By on Psychopathic seemed unsure. Drive-By is officially off Psychopathic as of Blaze's departure, and ABK is forming a new group on the label. |
| MC Breed | 2004–2008 | 1 | MC Breed signed to Psychopathic Records sub-label Urban Music Zone in 2004. He released The New Prescription on August 24, 2004. After UMZ closed in 2005, Breed moved over to Psychopathic Records, where he stayed until his death on November 22, 2008, while he was working on a new album. |
| Zodiac MPrint | 2007–2009 | 0 | Zodiac MPrint is a duo consisting of Blaze Ya Dead Homie and The R.O.C. The group released one unofficial song on Clockwork Gray ("I'll Connect") and one official song ("E.O.D. – Evolve Or Die"). The group was scheduled to release an album (Horrorscope), but released the song ("Shake") before The R.O.C. retired from rapping in 2009. The group reformed in 2012, which was officially announced at the GOTJ 2012. Currently signed to Majik Ninja Entertainment, the duo released the Ride The Stars EP in 2016. |
| Twiztid | 1997–2002; 2003–2012 | 9 | When House of Krazees members Mr. Bones and Hektic left HOK in 1996, they recorded a demo album, which was sent it to Psychopathic. Violent J was so impressed with the group that he asked them to sign to Psychopathic. They did, and together they came up with a name they felt fit the group, "Twiztid". They released their debut album Mostasteless on November 25, 1997. They left the label in late 2002 to form their own label Majik Recordz before the label folded in 2003, and Twiztid returned to the label. They announced that they were again leaving the label on December 12, 2012, and formed Majik Ninja Entertainment in 2014. |
| Cold 187um | 2011–2013 | 1 | He joined ICP and Twiztid on the "American Psycho Tour" from September 2011 to October 2011, and recorded a song with the four, titled "Where Do We Go From Here?" He officially signed to Psychopathic in December 2011. Cold 187 um released only one album, The Only Solution, on October 22, 2012, which coincided with Twiztid's Abominationz album. He left Psychopathic in July 2013 due to the poor reception of the album by fans. |
| Blaze Ya Dead Homie | 1998–2013 | 8 | Blaze Ya Dead Homie signed with Psychopathic in 1999. He released his debut self-titled EP on Psychopathic in 2000. He released four studio albums, two EPs and a re-release of 1 Less G n Da Hood. He left Psychopathic in early to mid-2013 and signed with Majik Ninja Entertainment in 2014. |
| Jumpsteady | 1995–2005; 2012–2014 | 3 | Brother of Violent J, Jumpsteady was initially a don of Psychopathic Records. He was set to release his first album in 1997 but it got pushed back. In 2002, he went and released his first album there. Originally, he planned on retiring from music altogether after 2005. After going on for the 2012 Gathering of the Juggalos and performing for Smothered, Covered & Chunked, Jumpsteady returned to the label. Jumpsteady would join the group Legz Diamond & The Purple Gang, with guitarist/singer Legz Diamond and his brother Violent J's wife Sugar Slam. Their debut album "9 Pistolas", was released March 19, 2013. At the GOTJ 2013, Jumpsteady said he would like to have his next album out by the 2014 GOTJ. On October 11, 2013, Jumpsteady released a spoken-word CD titled The Road And Other True Stories. He has since retired from making music and works as a don for the label. |
| Boondox | 2005–2012; 2013–2015 | 5 | After selling his cassettes at an Insane Clown Posse concert, Boondox was contacted by group member Violent J and signed to Psychopathic Records in 2006, becoming the first Southern hip hop performer on the label. He released three studio albums and one EP on Psychopathic before leaving in 2012 due to a prescription pill addiction. He returned to the label in 2013, which was officially announced at the 2013 Gathering of the Juggalos, and released his first album in four years, Abaddon, on May 13, 2014. It was thought that he left Psychopathic Records in 2015 and signed with Majik Ninja Entertainment. |
| Boondox & Crucifix | 2014–2015 | 0 | During Boondox's 2014 GOTJ seminar it was announced that Boondox and Crucifix were teaming up to form a new duo on Psychopathic, and their debut album should be released sometime in 2015. When Boondox left Psychopathic Records in 2015, it disbanded the group from the label. |
| Zug Izland | 2002–2004; 2012–2015 | 3 | Formed by Violent J and producer Mike Puwal, Zug Izland released their debut album Cracked Tiles in 2003. After releasing 3:33 under subsidiary Ax & Smash Records and leaving Psychopathic Records altogether in 2004, the band returned to the label in 2012. In early 2016 Zug Izland announced that they are launching their new label, and plan to release Promised Land after having to produce the album out of pocket. |
| Axe Murder Boyz | 2005–2006; 2013–2016 | 2 | Won a one-year deal with the label, and was later moved to subsidiary label Hatchet House. They would later release an album and EP on Hatchet House before departing in late 2010. They would return to the label in 2013, with it being officially announced at the 2013 Gathering of the Juggalos and release their first album on the label since 2006, titled The Garcia Brothers on March 25, 2014. Otis (half of AMB) will release his debut solo album on Psychopathic titled "Slaughter" in 2015. On December 31, 2016, at 3:00 pm EST it was announced that Young Wicked has signed with Majik Ninja Entertainment. |
| Young Wicked | 2005–2006; 2013–2016 | 1 | Won a one-year deal with the label, and was later moved to subsidiary label Hatchet House. They would later release an album and EP on Hatchet House before departing in late 2010. They would return to the label in 2013, with it being officially announced at the 2013 Gathering of the Juggalos and release their first album on the label since 2006, titled The Garcia Brothers on March 25, 2014. Otis (half of AMB) will release his debut solo album on Psychopathic titled "Slaughter" in 2015. On December 31, 2016, at 3:00 pm EST it was announced that Young Wicked has signed with Majik Ninja Entertainment. |
| DJ Paul | 2013–2016 | 1 | DJ Paul joined psychopathic records in 2013. DJ Paul Crunchy Black and Koopsta Knicca (then known as Da Mafia 6ix) collaborated with the Insane Clown Posse to form the super group The Killjoy Club and released their debut album Reindeer Games September 2, 2014, of that year. The following year DJ Paul would release his solo album Master Of Evil on their label On October 30, 2015. On January 1, 2017, psychopathic released the track hurricane of diamonds in which ICP said this would include the entire psychopathic roster to settle the confusion as to who was on it. DJ paul was not included. Paul later said on his Instagram that he had a new crew he was working with on his own label. |
| Dark Lotus | 1998–2017 | 4 | Former label-mates Insane Clown Posse and Twiztid formed the supergroup Dark Lotus in 1998 and released the single "Echo Side," which was later included on Insane Clown Posse's album The Amazing Jeckel Brothers. The group went through several changes in their lineup since the 2001 release of their debut album Tales from the Lotus Pod before ultimately deciding on members Insane Clown Posse, Twiztid, and Blaze Ya Dead Homie. In an Insane Clown Posse interview with faygoluvers.net, it was announced that Dark Lotus is now disbanded. |
| Blahzay Roze | 2016–2017 | 1 | Announced in Gathering of the Juggalos infomercial in May 2016 the label plans to release the name of their "new discovery" at The 17th Annual Gathering Of The Juggalos in video form and a new six-song EP titled Broken and the first music video is titled "Broken". It has now been confirmed the new artist goes by the name Blahzay Roze. On February 26, 2017, Blahzay Rose depart from Psychopathic Records. |
| Tha Hav Knots | 2014–2017 | 0 | During Anybody Killa's 2014 Gathering seminar it was announced that he and Big Hoodoo have created a new group on Psychopathic Records, and will probably release their debut CD sometime in 2015. During the "Family Fun Time Tour" THK released their first song as a Xmas single, "Happy Wicked Holiday". During Anybody Killa's 2015 Gathering of the Juggalos seminar it was announced that Axe Murder Boyz member Bonez Dubb is the third member of Tha Hav Knots. However, after Axe Murder Boyz signed to Majik Ninja Entertainment at the beginning of 2017, Tha Hav Knots have since continued with the two original members on Native World. |
| DJ Clay | 2012–2017 | 9 | DJ Clay signed to Psychopathic sub label Hatchet House in 2007, made official at 2007 GOTJ. He released six mix tapes on Hatchet House. He would sign to Psychopathic in late 2012 and would release his first mixxtape on as a legit Psychopathic artist titled "A World Upside Down: The Mixxtape". He would later go on to join the group Zug Izland for a year. In 2017, DJ Clay left to focus on his own label Armed Robbery Entertainment, |
| Vanilla Ice | 2011–2017 | 0 | Vanilla Ice saw popular success throughout the late eighties and early nineties. A self-proclaimed Juggalo, he has performed at numerous Gathering of the Juggalos events since falling from mainstream attention. Ice was signed to the label in 2011 after gaining a loyal following with the fanbase. In a January 19, 2017 Insane Clown Posse interview with faygoluvers.net it was said that Vanilla Ice is still signed to Psychopathic Records, as he also plans to attend the 2017 Juggalo March On Washington to March and perform. Ice recorded an album with production by Mike E. Clark during this time and also had some electronic songs produced by his DJ that he would premiere in concerts. Ice said that at least five of the ten songs had been recorded in 2015. However, it was confirmed during the 2020 Psychopathic Don Shoot Interview that Ouija Macc is the only other artist on the label than ICP and the album was never released. |
| Myzery | 1997–2000; 2018 | 2 | Myzery is the brother-in-law of Jumpsteady, Myzery signed to Psychopathic in 1997, and released the Para la Isla EP in 1998. After getting into feuds with other label mates (Twiztid & Blaze Ya Dead Homie), and seeing low sales of his EP, Myzery departed Psychopathic. Since then he and Psychopathic Records have had a love-hate relationship. He was on Jumpsteady's album, Master Of The Flying Guillotine, in 2005. However, from 2003 to 2005, he was banned from entering the Gatherings. He then performed at GOTJ 2011 and was on the latest DJ Clay mixtape in 2013, A World Upside Down: The Mixxtape on the song "Don't Push Me". He also made a song with Violent J for his latest album, Demon/Angel, called "Knockin' on Heaven's Door", which marked the first time they had collaborated since 1999. ICP is also on the song titled Chains. On July 4, 2018, in the GOTJ Infomercial, it was announced that Myzery was temporarily on Psychopathic Records and would be rereleasing the full-length album 20th Anniversary: Para la Isla and will be releasing a new album titled The Demon Angel at the 2018 Gathering of the Juggalos. |
| The Killjoy Club | 2013–2016; 2018 | 1 | A supergroup composed of Insane Clown Posse and Da Mafia 6ix, according to a recent interview with DJ Paul the group was formed in mid to late 2013 after Violent J and Shaggy approached DJ Paul and DM6 about forming a group, it was announced during Insane Clown Posse's 2014 GOTJ seminar that they are signed to the label and will release their debut album entitled Reindeer Games September 2, 2014. The future of the group is unknown after the passing of Koopsta Knicca on October 9, 2015, and the falling out with Young Wicked in December 2016/January 2017. On June 21, 2018, it was announced that Violent J, Shaggy 2 Dope, DJ Paul and Crunchy Black would reunite at the 2018 Gathering of the Juggalos and perform as The Killjoy Club. |
| The Loony Goons | 2018 | 0 | In a January 19, 2017 Insane Clown Posse interview with Faygoluvers.net, it was announced that a new supergroup featuring Insane Clown Posse will be announced in 2017 with a possible album release in 2017. During ICP's 2018 GOTJ seminar it was announced that the new supergroup on the label is called The Loony Goons and consists of, Insane Clown Posse, Big Hoodoo, Lyte and Ouija Macc, and they would begin recording their debut album when they return home from the GOTJ, and the album would be released in 2019. On October 21, 2020, ICP confirmed during the Psychopathic Don Shoot Interview that the album and group fell through. |
| Lyte | 2017–2019 | 1 | In the September 3, 2016, edition of the Hatchet Herald it was announced that Psychopathic Records will be debuting new artists soon. It was announced in the December 3, 2016, edition of the hatchet Herald that the new artist will be revealed in the cypher If We Were A Gang on January 1, 2017. Lyte formerly known as Young Lyte was announced as the new artist on January 1, 2017. His first release was Psychopathic Monstar EP released on July 23, 2017. His debut full-length album titled Broke But Still Shining is slated for a December 2018 release. He is a part of the super groups Lil Rydas (Lyte & Ouija Macc) and The Loony Goons (Insane Clown Posse, Big Hoodoo, Lyte and Ouija Macc). On October 21, 2020, it was confirmed during the Psychopathic Don Shoot Interview that Lyte was off the label. |
| Lil Rydas | 2017–2019 | 0 | In late 2017, Lyte and Ouija Macc were taking to social media hesitating themselves as Lil Rydas and a new group and album would be released under that name. During Lyte and Ouija Macc's 2018 Gathering of the Juggalos seminar, they were asked if they were doing the Lil Rydas project. After an ominous laughter from Lyte he said "Yeah, and it's pure fire". He then asked if they truly wanted to see the project happen, and after a positive response, Ouija Macc said to expect it at the GOTJ 2019, and also said "that without a doubt just because they are called "Lil Rydas", doesn't mean they are trying to ripoff, or disrespect in any way, but to pay homage to Psychopathic Rydas, since the group and the members were such big influences on them". The album never came to fruition and Lyte left the label in 2019. |
| Anybody Killa | 2001–2006; 2007–2019 | 5 | Originally serving as a hype man for Blaze Ya Dead Homie, Anybody Killa released his debut album Hatchet Warrior in 2003. After leaving Psychopathic Records in 2006, he returned to the label the following year. Killa's lyrical content draws heavily from his Native American heritage. Since his return he has released two studio albums Mudface (2008), Medicine Bag (2010) and a compilation album The Perfection Collection (2014). However, it was confirmed during the 2020 Psychopathic Don Shoot Interview that Ouija Macc is the only other artist on the label than ICP. |
| Big Hoodoo | 2012–2020 | 3 | Doe Dubbla was a partner of Psychopathic Records since 2010 on Hatchet Radio. Announced in 2013 that there will be a new entity, two years in the making. In 2013, Doe Dubbla officially signed to Psychopathic Records under the alias of Big Hoodoo, and his debut album Crystal Skull was released July 2, 2013. He is also a part of the supergroups, Tha Hav Knots (Anybody Killa and Big Hoodoo), and The Loony Goons (Insane Clown Posse, Big Hoodoo, Lyte and Ouija Macc). On September 26, 2020, Big Hoodoo released his third album The Hoodini Chronicles Part I: The Redbook. On October 21, 2020, it was confirmed during the Psychopathic Don Shoot Interview that Hoodoo was officially off the label. |

== Producers ==
=== Current ===
| Producer | Years | Description |
|---|---|---|
| Mike E. Clark | 1991–2000; 2005–2015 and since 2020 | Brought in to produce ICP during Carnival of Carnage, MEC remained on the label producing every album, and four songs for Dark Lotus' debut album, Tales From The Lotus Pod, before having a falling out with ICP. MEC returned in 2005 and produced some of Shaggy 2 Dope's solo album, F.T.F.O., released on February 21, 2006. He also produced ICP's album The Tempest, before working directly with the group in 2008 on the 1st Joker Card in the 2nd Deck, Bang! Pow! Boom!, which was released on September 1, 2009. He released two albums, Psychopathic Murder Mix Vol. 1 released on June 23, 2009, and Psychopathic Murder Mix Vol. 2, released on November 9, 2010, both on Psychopathic Records' sub-label, Hatchet House. He is set to produce Insane Clown Posse's twelfth joker's card The Naught. |
| Mike P. | 2000–2005 and since 2013 | Originally brought in in 2000 to finish producing Tales From The Lotus Pod, he was then the main producer, producing most albums until he left in 2005. He is also the guitarist for Zug Izland. He returned in 2013 and has become a regular producer at the label. |
| Brian Kuma | Since 2001 | Brought in in 2001 to help produce ABK's debut album Hatchet Warrior, he has helped produce many albums on the label since. |
| Devereaux | Since 2018 | Brought in by Ouija Macc in 2018 to help produce his debut album Gutterwater and became a longtime collaborator of his. He would also go onto produce a couple tracks on Fearless Fred Fury. During the ICP Seminar during ICP's House Party Peep Show in October 2020, it was announced that Psychopathic had formed a production team of four producers called the 4 Horsemen of the Metropolis. The group consisted of Devereauxx, Shaggytheairhead, Str8jaket & a fourth producer who will be named at a later date. However, the future of the group remains unknown due to Str8jaket departing the label on December 23, 2020. |
| Shaggytheairhead | Since 2019 | Also brought in by Ouija Macc in 2019 to help produce ICP's sixteenth album Yum Yum Bedlam. During the ICP Seminar during ICP's House Party Peep Show in October 2020, it was announced that Psychopathic had formed a production team of four producers called the 4 Horsemen of the Metropolis. The group consisted of Devereauxx, Shaggytheairhead, Str8jaket & a fourth producer who will be named at a later date. However, the future of the group remains unknown due to Str8jaket departing the label on December 23, 2020. |

=== Former ===
| Producer | Years | Description |
|---|---|---|
| Fritz "the Cat" Van Kosky | 2000–2007 | Brought in in 2000 to produce Twiztid's sophomore album Freek Show and has become a longtime collaborator with them ever since. He also helped produce albums for Blaze Ya Dead Homie, Anybody Killa and produced three songs on Insane Clown Posse's 2004 album Hell's Pit. Currently an in-house producer for Majik Ninja Entertainment. |
| Esham | 2002–2005 | Signed as a solo artist in 2002, he helped produce some albums on the label until he left in 2005. |
| Young Wicked | 2013–2016 | One half of Axe Murder Boyz, Young Wicked produced The Garcia Brothers, The Mud, Water, Air & Blood, Reindeer Games, The Marvelous Missing Link: Lost, The Marvelous Missing Link: Found, Slaughter, and the Broken EP. After an internal conflict at Psychopathic Records he was put on leave in September 2016, and during Twiztid's Spooktacular Horror Show Tour (October 2016) they signed YW (with no word given to PSY), and took what songs he had recorded and released them as an EP. Young Wicked was announced to Majik Ninja Entertainment on December 31, 2016, and Vengeance EP was released on the same day and features Bonez Dubb and Twiztid. |
| DJ Clay | 2005–2018 | After catching the attention of Shaggy 2 Dope, he was brought in to help produce Shaggy's solo album F.F.F.O., which was released on February 21, 2006. He signed to Psychopathic Records' sub-label Hatchet House in 2007 and released his first mixtape, and the first in the series, Let Em Bleed: The Mixtape Vol. 1, on February 11, 2008. He has released seven mixtapes on Hatchet House. He has a New mixtape scheduled for a December 2016 release titled The Sidewayz Room. He helped Shaggy 2 Dope produce his second solo album F.T.F.O.M.F. in 2017 and left the label the following year. |
| Str8jaket | 2016–2020 | An artist on ABK's label Native World Inc., it was announced on November 17, 2016, that he was the new Psychopathic Records in-house engineer. It was also announced that he was working with the new artists on the label. He has done production for Lyte's album Psychopathic Monstar EP, Ouija Macc's debut album Gutterwater, and Insane Clown Posse's fifteenth album Fearless Fred Fury. During the ICP Seminar during ICP's House Party Peep Show in October 2020, it was announced that Psychopathic had formed a production team of four producers called the 4 Horsemen of the Metropolis. The group consisted of Devereauxx, Shaggytheairhead, Str8jaket & a fourth producer who will be named at a later date. On December 23, 2020, Str8jaket announced his departure from the label via Facebook. |
| Domain | 2017–2018 | In a January 19, 2017, Faygoluvers.net interview with Insane Clown Posse it was said by Violent J that they have also signed Domain as a producer, and he is working on new music for upcoming "Psychopathic Records" artists albums. However, he left with DJ Clay to work on Armed Robbery Entertainment. |

== Subsidiaries ==
=== Hatchet Gear ===
Psychopathic Records began distribution of merchandise in 1994 by selling T-shirts. After several comic books drawn by Joseph Utlser sold quickly in 1994, the label also started manufacturing collectibles. Psychopathic later created a separate department for their merchandising and called their line Hatchet Gear, named after the label's Hatchetman logo which more closely resembles a traditional meat cleaver. Hatchetgear currently sells everything from T-shirts, jerseys, and hoodies to "energy drinks, action figures, ski masks, liquor flasks, jewelry, and sneakers." The range and marketability of their merchandise has become an aspect of the company.

=== Psychopathic Video ===
Psychopathic Video has released six professional wrestling videos, five concert films, five documentaries, one mockumentary, one mini-movie, one collection of music videos, and two feature films. On August 31, 2004, Psychopathic Video made world history when it released the mini-movie Bowling Balls with Insane Clown Posse's album Hell's Pit. The video was the first ever 3-D film shot in high-definition.

Films produced, co-produced, and/or distributed by Psychopathic Video include:

- ICP's Strangle-Mania (1995, Psychopathic Video's first film)
- Shockumentary (1997)
- JCW, Volume 1 (2000)
- Big Money Hustlas (2000, co-distributed with Island Def Jam Music Group and Non-Homogenized Productions)
- Psychopathic: The Videos (2007)
- A Family Underground (2009)
- Big Money Rustlas (2010)

=== Psychopathic Sports ===
Psychopathic Sports was launched in 1997 when Insane Clown Posse released a VHS entitled ICP's Strangle-Mania, which featured a compilation of professional wrestling death matches from the Outrageously Violent Wrestling from Japan video collection, overdubbed with their own humorous commentary. It hosted two Strangle-Mania Live wrestling events in 1997 and 1998. With Juggalo Championship Wrestling's inception in 1999, Psychopathic Sports turned its full focus to the promotion. In 2007, it started the SlamTV! internet wrestling show, as well as the SlamTV! Express mini-show in 2010. Psychopathic Sports also promoted the debut house show for TNA Wrestling on March 17, 2006, in Plymouth, Michigan.

The department expanded in January 2010, announcing that it had bought a warehouse to run operations in Novi, Michigan and had hired full-time workers. They also announced plans to run Juggalo Championship Wrestling full-time starting November of that year. The promotion announced that they would hold tapings of SlamTV! every other week, as well as run one additional show a month, at the Juggalo Arena. All shows will be taped and released on DVD, and a that a clothing line was set to be created. However, no announcements for the Juggalo Arena nor SlamTV! tapings were made after this.

== Sublabels ==
=== Joe & Joey (1999–2017) ===
Originally formed to feature the releases for Psychopathic Rydas, in case they got in trouble could fold the label without prosecution for releasing stolen music without consent, and not paying royalties. The label also saw the releases, Psychopathics from Outer Space (2000), Psychopathics from Outer Space 2 (2003) and Psychopathics from Outer Space 3 (2007).

=== Ax & Smash (2003) ===
In 2002 when Zug Izland was signed to the label, a sub label was created for their releases called Ax & Smash. The sub label saw only one release with Cracked Tiles which was released on January 31, 2003. Their second release 3:33 was released on Psychopathic Records on June 1, 2004. After leaving the label in 2004, they were resigned in 2012, with Toxicology: Zug Izland's Dopest Bangers being released on August 13, 2013, on Psychopathic Records, before being released in 2016.

=== Urban Muzik Zone (2004–2008) ===
Created in 2004 at the same time as Ax & Smash Records, to feature a new genre to help expand the Juggalo fan base that they might not know about. Detroit legend MC Breed was signed to the label and released the label's only release with The New Prescription on August 24, 2004. MC Breed was working on a new album to release on UMZ/Psychopathic before his untimely death on November 28, 2008, after a pickup game of basketball.

=== Hatchet House (2007–2012) ===
Formed in 2007, and made official at the 2007 Gathering of the Juggalos. It was announced that DJ Clay, Motown Rage and Tali Demon were signed to the sub label. Tali Demon was the first female act to ever sign with the label, though she left after six months due to creative differences. The first release was DJ Clay's Let Em Bleed: The Mixxtape, Vol. 1 released on February 18, 2008. The label went on hiatus after DJ Clay was made a full-time artist on Psychopathic in 2012, but released A World Upside Down: The Mixxtape on Psychopathic and Hatchet House on June 4, 2013.

=== Big Baby Records (since 2018) ===
During Insane Clown Posse's 2018 Gathering of the Juggalos seminar it was announced by Violent J that he was starting his own sub label through Psychopathic and will be called Big Baby Records, and will see releases in "special compilations".

=== Chapter 17 Records (since 2022) ===
On March 4, 2022, Ouija Macc has announced opening his sub-label under Psychopathic Records called Chapter 17 Records and his first signee, HEXXX. June 1st 2023 Darby O’Trill was announced as the second & newest artist on the label with a release date for his debut album Creek expected for July 21st, 2023.

== Annual events ==
Psychopathic Records holds several annual events throughout the year that feature performances by the entire label, sometimes referred to as the Psychopathic Family or Hatchet Family. In 2008, the label hosted the first "Hatchet Attacks," which occurs in the first half of each year and features performances by the entire label and JCW wrestling. Since 2000, it has been hosting the Gathering of the Juggalos, an event that spans four days throughout August. It features over 100 bands, professional wrestling, and various party activities. Within the week of Christmas, Psychopathic hosts "Big Ballas X-Mas Party." Along with JCW wrestling and guest performers, the final act consists of the entire Psychopathic label performing together, known specifically as the Deadly Medley.

== Psychopathic Psyphers ==
=== Psypher 1 ===
The first Psychopathic Psypher was released on July 5, 2011, and featured Violent J, Jamie Madrox, Anybody Killa and Bootleg, with music by DJ Clay.

=== Psypher 2 ===
The second Psychopathic Psypher was released on July 5, 2011, and featured Shaggy 2 Dope, Monoxide Child, Blaze Ya Dead Homie, Boondox and Shoestring, with music by DJ Clay.

=== Psypher 3 ===
The third Psychopathic Psypher was released on December 29, 2011, and featured Insane Clown Posse, Twiztid, Drive-By and Cold 187um, with music by DJ Clay. The video was directed by Brian Kuma, and filmed at The Filmore in Detroit, Michigan.

=== Psypher 4 ===
The fourth Psychopathic Psypher was released in mid-2012 and featured Insane Clown Posse, House of Krazees, Drive-By, Cold 187 Legz Diamond and Doe Dubbla (who would later sign to Psychopathic Records as Big Hoodoo), with music by DJ Clay. The video was filmed at the Scrap Yard in Detroit, Michigan.

=== Psypher 5 ===
It was announced during ICP's 2014 GOTJ seminar that they would be doing another Psypher, this time featuring artists who were not on the label. ICP threw out a name to see the fans' response, and it was then confirmed that Swollen Members artist and solo artist Madchild would be featured on the Psypher. ICP said that it should be out sometime before Halloween 2014.

In mid-2015 ICP announced that they would be holding a contest at the 2015 GOTJ and that the top eight winners would be featured on the fifth Psypher. The winners included Gypsy, Frodo the Ghost, G-Mike Cannibal, Ill Phil, Lowercase J, Sewerside, & Skitzomichigan.

On September 9, 2015, Thomas "Cannibal" Cottingham, the winner of the 2015 GOTJ Psypher Contest, was killed saving a woman and her baby.

In the infomercial for the 2016 Gathering of the Juggalos it was announced that the Psychopathic Psypher 5 would be performed live on July 20, 2016, on the Big Top Stage. On September 16, 2016, the video for the Psypher was released with music by Kuma and performances by Big Cook, Mi$ta 420, TZK, Sewerside, Mr. 6ix and Less Legs. The video was directed and edited by Brian Kuma.

=== Psypher 6 ===
On November 17, 2016, it was announced that a new psypher would be out in January 2017, and will be titled "If We Were A Gang", to go along with the Juggalo March On Washington which will happen in September 2017. The Psypher was said to feature the Juggalo Family (current artists on the roster). On Thanksgiving 2016 it was announced that the Psypher will be released on January 1, 2017.

On February 17, 2017, at the 2017 Juggalo Day Weekend After Party the 6th Psychopathic Psypher titled If We Were A Gang was performed live. On February 21, 2017, the official video for If We Were A Gang was released and featured Anybody Killa, Lyte, Shaggy 2 Dope, Big Hoodoo, Blahzay Roze, DJ Clay and Violent J.

=== Psypher 7 ===
In late December 2016 it was announced that Psychopathic Records will be sending out personalized invitations for the Juggalo March On Washington 2017 to every artist invited to perform at the March. It was said that on the website (thejuggalomarch.com) people can view each invitation (as they were created for each artist invited specifically) and if the artist accepts a yellow diamond will appear next to the artist, should the artist decline a red "x" will appear next to the artist. For the artists that accept the invitation to perform they will be sent an audio clip for 16 bars to record their vocals on and when they send it back, a camera crew will be sent out to the artists location and record the video for the artists verse. It was stated that the artists invited have a 90-day answering period. Soon before the March the Juggalo March Psypher will be released, and performed live at the March. Since January 1, 2017 Insane Clown Posse, Wolfpac, 2 Live Crew, Glasses Malone, Kissing Candice, Anybody Killa, Big Hoodoo, Blahzay Roze, DJ Clay, Jumpsteady, Lyte, JellyRoll, Vanilla Ice, Lil Wyte, Kung Fu Vampire, Scum, Liquid Assassin, Bukshot, Sewerside, Project Born, Zug Izland, Lo Key, 1 Ton, Crucifix and Madchild have all accepted invitations for the March. Tech N9ne will be featured but will not March. While music artists Esham, Killa C, The R.O.C., Twiztid, Blaze Ya Dead Homie, Lex "The Hex" Master, G-Mo Skee, Boondox, Gorilla Voltage, Young Wicked, Axe Murder Boyz and MC Chris have all respectively declined. On the April 13, 2017, edition of The Juggalo Show Violent J said Tech N9ne will not be able to make the Juggalo March On Washington due to his new contract with Paradigm Records having him tour Canada at the time of the March, but will be on the Psypher. On May 8, 2017 Necro announced he would no longer take part in the March, stating that "it's all good, just business, nothing personal".

=== Psypher 8 ===
On October 5, 2017 Insane Clown Posse held a "Surprize Guerrilla Show" featuring Anybody Killa, DJ Clay, Big Hoodoo, and Lyte for $5. It was said that a music video would be shot the same night as well. The video featured the whole label including the new artist Ouija Macc of the group Swag Toof. The video was to include Anybody Killa, but didn't because his van broke down causing him to be late for the video. He showed up in time to perform his set, but Violent J told him that beings though he missed the video shoot he wasn't going to perform. The video was released on October 30, 2017. The song features Lyte, Violent J, Big Hoodoo, Shaggy 2 Dope & Ouija Macc plus the video features DJ Clay as the DJ, and Legz Diamond as the ring announcer. The song was produced, engineered, mixed and mastered by Strange Music's in-house producer Seven, and recorded at The Lotus Pod and Dustys Boom Room in Detroit, Michigan.

== Juggalo Day shows ==
=== Juggalo Day Show 2013: "Riddle Box" ===
During ICP's GOTJ 2012 seminar it was announced that the first Juggalo Day Show would be held on February 17, 2013, at St. Andrew's Hall in Detroit, Michigan. The show featured performances by Project Born, Myzery and Insane Clown Posse.

=== Juggalo Day Show 2014: "The Great Milenko" ===
During ICP's 2013 GOTJ seminar it was announced that the upcoming Juggalo Day Show would be "The Great Milenko". The show was held February 17, 2014, at the Newport Music Hall in Columbus, Ohio. The show featured performances by Downtown Brown, ClaAs, Big Hoodoo and Insane Clown Posse.

=== Juggalo Day Show 2015: "Take Me Home" ===
During ICP's GOTJ 2014 seminar they announced that they would turn "Juggalo Day" into a weekend event. The first night, February 20, 2015, the movies Big Money Hustlas and Big Money Rustlas were shown. The next night, February 21, 2015, the "Take Me Home" show was held at the Masonic Temple in Detroit, Michigan. The show featured performances by Trick Trick, Big Hoodoo, Anybody Killa and Insane Clown Posse. The shows name was taken from a track that was on Forgotten Freshness Vol. 3, with new vocals written for the 2015 Juggalo Day Show.

=== Juggalo Day Show 2016: "Ringmaster" ===
During ICP's 2015 GOTJ seminar it was said that they would do the Ringmaster. The places being considered were Worcester, Massachusetts, Dallas, Texas and Detroit, Michigan.

Confirmed during 2015 Hallowicked, it was announced it would be held February 19 and 20. The 19th would be held at St. Andrews in Detroit, MI, with a full show of JCW and the first ever live concert of The Killjoy Club. The 20th would have Esham returning and the main event of Insane Clown Posse doing a live concert of The Ringmaster from beginning to end. Special guests are said to be announced at insaneclownposse.com. The first night consisted sets from Tha Hav Knots (Anybody Killa, Big Hoodoo, Bonez Dubb), Lil Wyte, Mastamind, DJ Yella, Lil Eazy-E and The Killjoy Club (ICP, DM6, Young Wicked). The second night featured sets from Molly Gruesome, Swag Toof, King 810, Young Wicked, Mushroomhead, Esham, Twiztid (surprise guest) (songs: "2nd Hand Smoke", "Mutant X", "We Don't Die", "Different", and "Rock The Dead"), and Insane Clown Posse with Mike E. Clark on the turntables.

=== Juggalo Day Show 2017: The Amazing Jeckel Brothers ===
During Insane Clown Posse's Gathering of the Juggalos 2016 seminar it was announced that the 2017 Juggalo Day Show would take place in Florida and will feature performances from Blaze Ya Dead Homie, Twiztid, Insane Clown Posse and Dark Lotus performing their debut album Tales from the Lotus Pod in its entirety. On October 4, 2016, the details for Juggalo Day 2017 were announced. Day 1 will feature JCW and performances from Young Lyte, Lex "The Hex" Master, Anybody Killa, Blaze Ya Dead Homie, Shaggy 2 Dope and Twiztid. Day two will feature JCW and performances from Sewerside, Blahzay Roze, The R.O.C., G-Mo Skee, Big Hoodoo, Boondox and Dark Lotus.

On January 19, 2017, via an interview with faygoluvers.net, Insane Clown Posse announced that Twiztid and all Majik Ninja Entertainment artists have been removed from Juggalo Day 2017 thus removing Dark Lotus. On January 20, 2017, the new lineup for Juggalo Day 2017 was released, Day 1 (February 16, 2017) will feature Juggalo Championship Wrestling, and sets from: T.B.A., Sewerside, Lyte, Blahzay Roze, Kottonmouth Kings and Insane Clown Posse performing Tunnel of Love EP. Day two (February 17, 2017) will feature Juggalo Championship Wrestling and sets from: T.B.A., Big Hoodoo, DJ Clay, Stitches, Anybody Killa and Insane Clown Posse performing The Amazing Jeckel Brothers album.

=== Juggalo Day Show 2018: Heckles & Macabre ===
On January 1, 2018, it was announced that the 2018 Juggalo Day Weekend would take place on February 16 & 17, 2018 in Las Vegas, Nevada. Day 1 will feature sets from DJ Clay, Lyte, Green Jellÿ, Rittz and Insane Clown Posse. Day two will feature sets from The Flatlinerz, Ouija Macc, Big Hoodoo, Kung Fu Vampire and Insane Clown Posse. The weekend will also feature Juggalo Championship Wrestling. On February 14, 2018, the time line for the 2018 Juggalo Day was released.

Day 1:

- Donnie Menace: 6:30–6:45
- Freakshow Sideshow: 6:45–7:00
- DJ Clay: 7:00–7:20
- Freakshow Sideshow: 7:20–7:40
- Green Jellÿ: 7:40–8:10
- Lyte: 8:25–9:00
- Freakshow Sideshow: 9:15–9:45
- Rittz: 10:10–11:00
- Insane Clown Posse: 11:20–12:30

Day 2:

- Ouija Macc: 6:30–6:50
- Freakshow Sideshow: 7:00–7:20
- Big Hoodoo: 7:40–8:10
- Freakshow Sideshow: 8:10–8:25
- Kung Fu Vampire: 8:25–9:00
- Freakshow Sideshow: 9:15–9:45
- The Flatlinerz: 10:10–11:00
- Insane Clown Posse: 11:20–12:30

== Canadian Juggalo Day shows ==
=== Canadian Juggalo Day Show 2017 ===
During Insane Clown Posse's Gathering of the Juggalos 2016 seminar it was announced that the first Canadian Juggalo Day Show will be held on March 17, 2017, and will feature performances from the entire Psychopathic Records roster as well as Twiztid and Blaze Ya Dead Homie.

On January 11, 2017, it was announced that the Canadian Juggalo Day would take place on April 7 and 8 in Calgary. Insane Clown Posse is the only confirmed artist. On the first night, Insane Clown Posse will headline performing Riddle Box in its entirety. On the second night Insane Clown Posse will headline performing all their biggest hits. The website for the show is also up. On February 1, 2017, it was announced the dates when Psychopathic Records would announce the artists performing. On February 6, 2017, it was announced that Blahzay Roze, Lyte and Big Hoodoo would be performing. Anybody Killa will not be performing due to him being on his April Fools Foolin' Tour which will run throughout the month of April. Blahzay Roze is scheduled to perform on the first night from 6:05–6:55 pm. Lyte is scheduled to perform on the first night from 7:00–7:50 pm. On February 13 it was announced that Ice-T would be performing on the second night from 9:50–10:50 pm. On February 17, 2017, it was announced that Canadian rapper Merkules would be performing on the second night from 7:00–7:50 pm. On February 20, 2017, it was announced that Kung Fu Vampire would be performing on the second night from 7:55–8:45 pm. On February 22, 2017, it was announced that Kissing Candice would be performing on the second night from 6:05–6:55 pm. On February 24, 2017, it was announced that Onyx would be performing on the first night from 7:45–8:45 pm. On February 27, 2017, it was announced that 2 Live Crew would be performing on the first night from 8:50–9:50 pm. On March 23, 2017 Blahzay Roze took to social media to say that Psychopathic Records had contacted her to tell her that she has been dropped from the 2017 Canadian Juggalo Day Weekend.

== March on Washington (free concert) ==
On January 1, 2017, an invitation was sent out to multiple artists that have performed at the Gathering of the Juggalos or a live event, including such acts: 2 Live Crew (accepted), Anybody Killa (accepted), Aqualeo, Axe Murder Boyz (declined), Big B, Big Hoodoo (accepted), Bizarre, Blahzay Roze (accepted), Blaze Ya Dead Homie (declined), Bone Thugs-N-Harmony, Boondox (declined), Brotha Lynch Hung, Bukshot (accepted), Bushwick Bill, Ces Cru, Crucifix (accepted), Crunchy Black, Da Mafia 6ix/DJ Paul, Danny Brown, The Dayton Family, DJ Clay (accepted), DJ Hoppa, Esham (declined), Glasses Malone (accepted), G-Mo Skee (declined), Gwar, Hed pe, Hopsin, Ho99o9, Ice-T, Ill Bill, Jarren Benton, JellyRoll (accepted), Johnny Richter, Juicy J, Jumpsteady (accepted), Killa C (declined), King Gordy, Kissing Candice (accepted), Kottonmouth Kings with Johnny Richter & DJ Bobby B, Kung Fu Vampire (accepted), La Coka Nostra, Lex "The Hex" Master (declined), Lil Eazy E, Lil Wyte (accepted), Liquid Assassin (accepted), Lyte (accepted), Lo Key (accepted), Madchild (accepted), Mastamind, ¡Mayday!, Mike E. Clark, MC Chris (declined), Motown Rage, Moonshine Bandits, Murs, Mushroomhead, Myzery, Necro (declined), Onyx, Potluck (disbanded), Project Born (accepted), Prozak, R.A. the Rugged Man, Razakel, Rittz, The R.O.C. (declined), Scarface, Scum (accepted), Sewerside (accepted), Slaine, Smokehouse Junkiez, Stevie Stone, Tech N9ne (declined), T.O.N.E-z, Twisted Insane, Twiztid (declined), Vanilla Ice (accepted), Waka Flocka Flame, Whitney Peyton, Willie D, Wolfpac (accepted), Young Wicked (declined), Zug Izland (accepted). Also other celebrities were invited to join within a few weeks.

As of January 1, 2017, only the host of the event, Insane Clown Posse had accepted an invitation, and no one had declined. On January 2, 2017 Esham declined the invitation stating in part "I do not wish to put myself, my family or my team in any position to sustain bodily harm". Also on January 2, 2017 Wolfpac accepted the invitation to perform, March and take part in the Family Psypher. On January 2, 2017 Killa C declined the invitation (as he is now a devout Christian and no longer does horrorcore). Also on the same day other artist, 2 Live Crew, Glasses Malone and Kissing Candice accepted the invitation. A few hours later Anybody Killa, Big Hoodoo, Blahzay Roze, DJ Clay, Jumpsteady, Lyte, JellyRoll, Vanilla Ice, Lil Wyte and Kung Fu Vampire all accepted invitations for the March. A few hours later in the mid evening of January 2, 2017 Twiztid and Scum accepted their invitations. Late in the night of January 2, 2017 Liquid Assassin and Bukshot accepted their invitations to the March. On January 3, 2017, artists Necro and Sewerside accepted their invitations, while The R.O.C. declined. In the early afternoon on January 3, 2017 Project Born accepted their invitations to the March. On January 4, 2017, the list updated to show that Twiztid, Blaze Ya Dead Homie, Lex "The Hex" Master, G-Mo Skee, Boondox and Young Wicked have all declined via a post on Facebook. Since Young Wicked will not take part in the March, Axe Murder Boyz too will not take part. On January 5, 2017 Zug Izland accepted their invitations for the March. On January 11, 2017 Lo Key accepted his invitation for the March. On January 12, 2017, MC Chris declined his invitations stating in part, "I do not have a problem with Juggalos, but I will decline the invite because I have a upcoming fall tour, and am dependent on the DC market to make a living". On January 13, 2017 Potluck announced that they were no longer performing together, and have officially disbanded, thus they will not perform at the 2017 Juggalo March On Washington. On February 26, 2017, it was announced by the venue that Sam Hunt is scheduled to perform at the Jiffy Lube Center on September 16, 2017, and there never was any Insane Clown Posse or Psychopathic Records event ever scheduled to perform that night.

On March 1, 2017, it was announced by Psychopathic Records that the concert was cancelled due to local law enforcement pressuring the venue to not allow the concert to be held there, but they are looking for a new venue to hold the concert. On March 17, 2017, it was announced that 1 Ton will take part in the March. On April 13, 2017 Violent J said Tech N9ne will not take part in the March (due to his new contract signing with Paradigm), but was "wholeheartedly" down to do a verse for the Family Psypher and subsequent video. On May 8, 2017 Necro announced via his Facebook account, that after being invited by Insane Clown Posse to join The Parental Advisory Tour with 2 Live Crew, Geto Boys, Onyx, and Lil Eazy E with DJ Yella, and being given a "low ball deal" to tour for "a month basically for free" he announced that he will not take part in the tour, and also rescinded his acceptance to take part in the March. On July 13, 2017, it was announced by TMZ that Fresh Kid Ice of 2 Live Crew had died.

== More reading ==
- Behind the Paint by Violent J with Hobey Echlin (2003)
- Juggalo: Insane Clown Posse And The World They Made by Steve Miller (2016)
- Another Decade Down by Violent J (2017/2018)
