= Legz Diamond =

- Born: Richard Murrell
- Origin: Detroit, Michigan, United States
- Genres: Rock, hip hop
- Occupations: Guitarist, Vocalist
- Instrument: Guitar
- Years active: 1991–present
- Label: Psychopathic

Richard Murrell is an American guitarist and singer from Detroit, Michigan, United States, better known as Legz Diamond. A former member of the rock band Coup Detroit, Murrell is best known as an affiliate of the hip hop duo Insane Clown Posse, for which he has provided production work, guitar and backing vocals and has also served as a Ring Announcer on their JCW wrestling tours. In 2013, Murrell signed as a solo artist with Psychopathic Records.

== Career ==
Murrell served as the guitarist of the rock band Coup Detroit during the 1990s. Producer Mike E. Clark introduced Insane Clown Posse to Coup Detroit in the hopes that Joseph Bruce would sign Coup Detroit to his label, Psychopathic Records; however, Bruce found the band unimpressive, except for Murrell's guitar playing. In spite of not liking the band, Insane Clown Posse agreed to record a guest appearance for Coup Detroit's 1996 self-titled album, on the track "Get Your Ass Off The Couch". Murrell also recorded guitar playing and backing vocals for ICP's 1995 album Riddle Box. Bruce wanted Murrell to leave Coup Detroit and form a supergroup consisting of Murrell and local Detroit musicians. This did not happen, but Murrell eventually left Coup Detroit and joined Psychopathic Records as an employee, as well as contributing guitar work and backing vocals on further Insane Clown Posse albums, including The Great Milenko. 2000 saw Murrell contribute to ICP's Bizaar and Bizzar albums and Twiztid's Freek Show album. In Bruce's 2003 book Behind the Paint, he stated that Murrell no longer worked full-time with Psychopathic, though he continued to contribute production work.

In 2004, Murrell contributed to ICP's Hell's Pit album. In 2011, Murell played guitar on Kottonmouth Kings' Sunrise Sessions album. In 2012, Murell made an appearance on Psychopathic's fourth "Psypher". In 2013, it was announced that Murell would sign with Psychopathic Records as an artist and release the album 9 Pistolas, a collaboration with the Purple Gang (Jumpsteady and Sugar Slam). The album will feature guest appearances from Bushwick Bill and Cold 187um.

== Discography ==
9 Pistolas (2013; with the Purple Gang)
