= Dark Carnival (Insane Clown Posse) =

Series of concept albums

The Dark Carnival is a series of concept albums described by hip hop duo Insane Clown Posse in much of their discography. The concept, similar to the "heaven and hell" language of monotheistic religions, is the primary source of inspiration for Insane Clown Posse's two series of albums called Joker's Cards, each containing six albums.

The Dark Carnival is where souls face judgment based on their individual actions before being sent to heaven or hell. The concept was reportedly inspired by a dream of Insane Clown Posse member Violent J where spirits in a traveling carnival appeared to him.

Most Insane Clown Posse studio albums are a part of the two decks of jokers cards as a part of The Dark Carnival. Albums not included in either hand are the double albums Bizaar / Bizzar and The Tempest.

The Dark Carnival concept was introduced with Joker Cards Deck 1, but not named, on Insane Clown Posse's first album Carnival of Carnage (1992), and was developed in subsequent releases Ringmaster (1994), Riddle Box (1995), The Great Milenko (1997), The Amazing Jeckel Brothers (1999), The Wraith: Shangri-La (2002), and The Wraith: Hell's Pit (2004).

It returned with the continuation of Deck 2 starting on the release Bang! Pow! Boom! (2009), then afterwards with The Mighty Death Pop! (2012), The Marvelous Missing Link: Lost / Found (2015), Fearless Fred Fury (2019), Yum Yum Bedlam (2021) and concluded with The Naught (2025).

== Creation ==
The concept of the Dark Carnival was inspired by a dream Joseph Bruce had after the foundation of Insane Clown Posse wherein spirits in a traveling carnival appeared to him. The group decided to incorporate this dream into their band's newly created persona. The spirits are each revealed in a series of albums called the Six Joker's Cards. Each spirit relays a message through the use of a moral story.

A Second Deck of Joker's Cards was introduced with Insane Clown Posse's Bang! Pow! Boom! (2009), a spirit in the Dark Carnival. The character is a demon-like figure that Bruce describes as a "continuous explosion that stomps his way through the crowd blowing [...] evil souls [...] to Hell". Though the group originally intended to make the character separate from the Six Joker's Cards, he was revealed as part of the second set of Joker's Cards.

== Overview ==
"The way I see the Dark Carnival is it's a place where you have all the evil souls that are going to be going to hell. Some of them may ride the "Murder Go Round" [or] the "Tilt a Whirl". Some of them may ride the "Terror Wheel" [or] the "Tunnel of Love". There are all different shows and rides at the Dark Carnival which will take you to hell."

— Violent J

J describes the Dark Carnival as "a place where you have all the evil souls that are going to be going to hell." It features carnival rides and attractions which assist in this purpose, which is the focus of multiple albums and songs within the group's discography. Each of the Joker's Cards relates to a specific character in the Dark Carnival that tries to "save the human soul" by showing the wickedness inside of one's self.

=== Joker's Cards ===
==== First deck of cards ====
The first Joker's Card, Carnival of Carnage (1992), is a representation of the ghetto and the violence that occurs within it. It takes the form of a traveling carnival which doles out the same brutality on those who have ignored the inner cities' cries for help. The Card issues a warning against the upper-class and government's negligence toward the lower classes.

The Ringmaster (1994), the second Joker's Card, is the story of the overseer of the Carnival of Carnage. He leads "the phantoms of the dead" that take the form of the Carnival. The creatures fiercely tear doomed souls from their living bodies and drag them down into hell. The Ringmaster himself is created through one's own sins, and is one of several who will judge whether a soul is worthy to enter heaven or doomed to eternal hell.

The third Joker's Card, the Riddle Box (1995), is another entity used to determine fate. Upon death, a soul enters a dark chamber containing a jack-in-the-box on an old wooden table. The front of the box has a "painted question mark faded with time," representing the mystery of your own afterlife. As the handle is turned, a melodic tune begins to play. When the music stops, the decision is revealed. The pure see a vision of God, warming their souls as they enter eternal peace. The wicked see an immense fog seeping from the box, "stripping their sanity, as they witness an image of hell, spawned and formed from their own evil; a hideous reflection of their demented souls." The floor falls from underneath them, casting the doomed into the bottomless pit of hell. The fate revealed by the Riddle Box can be found by looking deep within yourself and can be changed with righteous actions.

The Great Milenko (1997), the fourth Joker's Card, is an illusionist and a necromancer that acts on dead minds rather than dead spirits. His purpose is to try to trick individuals into greed and other lesser sins. He identifies the worst in an individual and creates powerful illusions in an attempt to cause them to become hedonistic and greedy. The Great Milenko is present within every person, and an honorable individual must fight his magic in order to make it to heaven.

The fifth Joker's Card, The Amazing Jeckel Brothers (1999), focuses on the nine circles of hell, and the morality of man as he is torn between righteousness and evil. Jack "the Sinister" and Jake "the Just" emerge from the smoke of a candle. The Jeckel Brothers juggle pulsating blood-covered balls representing the mortal life of the dead. For every sin committed, another ball is added. Jack throws Jake curves in an attempt to see a ball drop, and if a soul witnesses Jake drop one of the balls, he will be damned to hell. Souls who see Jake successfully complete the act ascend to heaven.

The sixth Joker's Card is "The Wraith", a personification of Death. The card features two "exhibits", Shangri-La (2002) and Hell's Pit (2004), which were each given their own album. The Wraith: Shangri-La revealed that the hidden message of Insane Clown Posse's music was always to follow God and make it to Heaven. Hell's Pit toured where those who do not atone for their sins nor follow the ways of Shangri-La are sent, illustrating the horrors of hell itself. It was announced at the 2012 Gathering of the Juggalos that ICP planned to release a box set of the six original Joker's Cards, with bonus content from each album era; however, the only bonus content released was the Dog Beats EP remastered.

==== Second deck ====
Bang! Pow! Boom! (2009) is the first Joker's Card of the second deck. The entity is a continuous explosion used to clear the carnival grounds when they become too crowded with souls of evil people who commit heinous sins such as pedophilia and murder.

The Mighty Death Pop! (2012) is the second Joker's Card, describing an entity that targets individuals who take great risks with their lives, The Mighty Death Pop character reaches out to us in a warning to avoid an early death.

The Marvelous Missing Link: Lost and The Marvelous Missing Link: Found, double albums, released April 28 and July 31, 2015, respectively, are the third Joker's Card. The Marvelous Missing Link: Lost is an entity that Violent J describes as "not having god in your life. Always being negative, looking at the world through a negative lens. Always living in fear, and living with hate". The Marvelous Missing Link: Found, the second part of the card, is in contrast, as "having been found," with both albums fitting their descriptions, as Lost has a dubstep base with lyrics about killing and bombs, while Found has rap beats and comedic lyrics, and also piano/guitar bases and uplifting lyrics.

On October 31, 2017, at Hallowicked, it was revealed that the fourth Jokers Card of the second Deck is titled Fearless Fred Fury. Fearless Fred Fury is a character who is a being of toxic anger, punishing souls who fail to live with dignity—those who put off all responsibility for their life, and feed on blame and resentment.

On October 5, 2020, the fifth Joker's Card in the second deck is revealed to be Yum Yum Bedlam. It is the first Joker's Card to be a female character. Yum Yum Bedlam depicts a spirit that uses the lust of men to capture and eat. There are also three smaller plants around Yum Yum which have received their own EPs (Wicked Vic the Weed, Pug Ugly the Stink Bud, and Woh the Weepin Weirdo).

Bruce has revealed that the second deck will conclude, as did the first, with a depiction of Heaven and Hell, told from the perspective of another character.

In a July 12, 2025 recap show, Juggalo YouTuber Humble Among talked about how he had talked to Violent J, and J had said the following about The Naught and its role: "The 2nd Deck ends with nothing. It's for those without faith, for those without belief. They believe when you die nothing happens, you just simply cease to exist. The Nothing. That's what the 2nd Deck ends with....nothing....The Naught. This Card explores what it truly means to be nothing."

== Themes ==
The Dark Carnival acts as a way to remind people of the repercussions of their individual actions "in a language that today's world will understand and listen to." It denounces actions that members Bruce and Joseph Utsler are against, including pedophilia, racism, bigotry, domestic violence, greed and sexual abuse. The themes of the Dark Carnival focus on death, morality, heaven and hell. The themes of God's presence and the final judgment of individuals are explored in multiple Insane Clown Posse songs. Throughout their career, the group has used parables set within the Dark Carnival mythology to warn of the ultimate consequences of immoral behavior. Their 2002 album The Wraith: Shangri-La, which ended the first set of Joker Card albums, with a song named The Unveiling, revealed that the hidden message of ICP's music was to follow God. Joseph Bruce remarked that "The ending of the Joker Cards, the way we looked at it, was death. Heaven and hell. That's up to each and every juggalo [to decide]."

Several journalists have commented on the apparent conflict between the group's sexualized and often violent lyrics and their stated spiritual message. In a June 2010 interview with The Columbian's Alan Sculley, Bruce explained, "[Sex and violence is] the stuff that people are talking about on the streets...to get attention, you have to speak their language. You have to interest them, gain their trust, talk to them and show you're one of them. You're a person from the street and speak of your experiences. Then at the end you can tell them God has helped me out like this and it might transfer over instead of just come straight out and just speak straight out of religion."

In an October 2010 article for The Guardian, Jon Ronson characterized the Insane Clown Posse as "evangelical Christians" who have "only been pretending to be brutal and sadistic to trick their fans into believing in God." In an interview with ICP conducted for the article, two of Ronson's queries referred parenthetically to ICP's "Christian message" and to the members' identities as "[secret] Christians." Several papers, including The Washington Post, published summaries of Ronson's claims.

Eight days after publication of the Guardian article, Joseph Bruce tweeted "I think [it's] crazy how some press say we're a Christian band and act like we're all religious [...] I'm proud that we believe in God but I haven't been to church since I was like 10. I don't even know if [Utsler has] ever been to church!" Christianity Today writer Mark Moring also challenged Ronson's characterization, writing that "The guys in ICP haven't used the word 'Christian' or 'evangelical' [...] so let's not call them anything that they're not claiming for themselves."

In 2011, Insane Clown Posse appeared on Attack of the Show! and denied claims that they were a Christian band. Bruce explained that their Dark Carnival mythology "comes from the basic principle of right and wrong, you know; evil and good. That’s all. We’re just trying to say that there’s bad guys out there and that there’s good guys out there [...] We were taught there’s a heaven and a hell, but that’s all we were taught. We weren’t taught about the [Ten] Commandments [... or] what’s in the Bible and all that. We just [...] want to see good people hopefully go to heaven, which we refer to as Shangri-La." Joseph Utsler explained in a 2002 interview with Craig Markley that "God is in your heart [...] In my definition, it doesn’t matter what creed, religion, or group you belong to. If you’re doing what’s right and are a good person, then you're right with God." Bruce and Utsler have also stated that they are not certain that God and the afterlife exist, but that they'd like to believe that there is something after death.

== Joker Cards & Sideshow EPs ==
=== Deck 1 ===
Card	Joker Card	Sideshow EP(s)
1	Carnival of Carnage	Beverly Kills 50187
2	Ringmaster	The Terror Wheel
3	Riddle Box	Tunnel of Love
4	The Great Milenko	
5	The Amazing Jeckel Brothers	Bizzar Bizaar
6	The Wraith: Shangri-La	
6	The Wraith: Hell's Pit	

=== Deck 2 ===
Card	Joker Card	Sideshow EP(s)
1	Bang! Pow! Boom!	
2	The Mighty Death Pop!	House of Wax
3	The Marvelous Missing Link: Lost	Phantom: X-tra Spooky
3	The Marvelous Missing Link: Found	Phantom: X-tra Spooky
4	Fearless Fred Fury	Flip the Rat
5	Yum Yum Bedlam	Yum Yum's Lure, Wicked Vic the Weed, Pug Ugly the Stink Bud, Woh the Weeping Weirdo
6	The Naught	

== Dark Carnival discography ==
=== Deck 1 ===
Card	Album details	Peak chart positions									RIAA certification (sales thresholds)
Card	Album details	US	Indie	Rap	R&B/Hip-Hop	Heatseekers	Catalog	UK	Internet	AUS	RIAA certification (sales thresholds)
1	Carnival of Carnage: Released: October 18, 1992; Label: Psychopathic Records; Format: CD, Cassette	–	–	–	–	–	–	–	–	–	Certification: Gold (2007) Sales: 500,000+
	Beverly Kills 50187 EP: Released: July 16, 1993; Label: Psychopathic Records; Format: CD, Cassette	–	–	–	–	–	–	–	–	–	
2	Ringmaster: Released: March 8, 1994; Label: Psychopathic Records; Format: CD, Cassette	–	–	–	–	–	–	–	–	–	Certification: Gold Sales: 500,000+
	The Terror Wheel EP: Released: August 5, 1994; Label: Psychopathic Records; Format: CD, Cassette	–	–	–	–	–	–	–	–	–	
3	Riddle Box: Released: October 10, 1995; Label: Psychopathic Records/Jive Records; Format: CD, Cassette	–	–	–	–	16	–	–	–	–	Certification: Gold Sales: 500,000+
	Tunnel of Love EP: Released: June 11, 1996; Label: Psychopathic Records; Format: CD, Cassette	–	–	–	–	–	–	–	–	–	
4	The Great Milenko: Released: June 24, 1997; Label: Psychopathic Records/Hollywood Records; Format: CD, Cassette	63	8	4	–	–	22	169	–	–	Certification: Platinum Sales: 1,000,000+
5	The Amazing Jeckel Brothers: Released: May 25, 1999; Label: Psychopathic Records/Island Records; Format: CD	4	4	4	–	–	–	99	5	–	Certification: Platinum Sales: 1,000,000+
6	The Wraith: Shangri-La: Released: November 5, 2002; Label: Psychopathic Records; Format: CD, Digital	15	1	8	–	–	–	–	–	71	
6	The Wraith: Hell's Pit: Released: August 31, 2004; Label: Psychopathic Records; Format: CD	12	1	5	–	–	–	184	12	49	

=== Deck 2 ===
Card (Overall)	Album details	Peak chart positions						RIAA certification (sales thresholds)
Card (Overall)	Album details	US	Indie	Rap	R&B/Hip-Hop	Tastemakers	Album Sales	RIAA certification (sales thresholds)
1 (7)	Bang! Pow! Boom!: Released: September 1, 2009; Label: Psychopathic Records; Format: CD, Digital	4	1	3	–	–	–	
2 (8)	The Mighty Death Pop!: Released: August 14, 2012; Label: Psychopathic Records; Format: CD, Digital	4	–	–	–	–	–	
	House of Wax EP: Released: November 25, 2014; Label: Psychopathic Records; Format: CD, Digital	–	–	–	–	–	–	
3 (9)	The Marvelous Missing Link: Lost: Released: April 28, 2015; Label: Psychopathic Records; Format: CD, Digital	17	2	2	–	7	7	
3 (9)	The Marvelous Missing Link: Found: Released: July 31, 2015; Label: Psychopathic Records; Format: CD, Digital	136	9	9	13	13	58	
	Phantom: X-tra Spooky EP: Released: December 10, 2015; Label: Psychopathic Records; Format: CD, Digital	–	–	–	–	–	–	
4 (10)	Fearless Fred Fury: Released: February 15, 2019; Label: Psychopathic Records; Format: CD, Digital	44	2	24	26	2	7	
5 (11)	Yum Yum Bedlam: Released: October 31, 2021; Label: Psychopathic Records; Format: CD, Digital		–	–	–	–	–	–
6 (12)	The Naught: Released: August 12, 2025; Label: Psychopathic Records; Format: CD, Digital							
