= Bang! Pow! Boom! =

Studio album by Insane Clown Posse
- Released: September 1, 2009
- Recorded: September 2008 – July 2009; Fun House Studio
- Genre: Horrorcore
- Label: Psychopathic
- Producer: Mike E. Clark

Insane Clown Posse chronology
The Tempest (2007)	Bang! Pow! Boom! (2009)	The Mighty Death Pop! (2012)

Bang! Pow! Boom! is the eleventh studio album by the American hip hop group Insane Clown Posse. Released on September 1, 2009, by Psychopathic Records, it was the group's second album with producer Mike E. Clark since his return to Psychopathic Records, and the first album to focus on the Dark Carnival since the conclusion of the group's original "Joker's Cards" series. The character is the first of a set of six new Joker's Cards.

The album's title refers to a character within the Dark Carnival described as a large, continuing explosion that clears evil souls from the carnival grounds. Bang! Pow! Boom! peaked at number four in the Billboard Top 200. Critics praised Clark's production and the return to the Dark Carnival concept. In 2010, Psychopathic Records released a "Nuclear Edition" of the album, which featured previously unreleased material. The music video for the song "Miracles", produced for the reissue became popular and was the subject of a Saturday Night Live parody, called "Magical Mysteries", which was praised by the group. It is the group's 26th overall release.

== Production ==
Mike E. Clark produced much of Insane Clown Posse's discography until the group's sixth and seventh albums, Bizzar and Bizaar. After Clark nearly died from a collapsed lung, he became less active in the music industry, his studio not being used for much of the early decade. ICPMike Puwal on their eighth and ninth albums, The Wraith: Shangri-La and Hell's Pit. In 2006, Clark returned to Psychopathic Records and produced the group's tenth studio album, The Tempest in 2007, but did not work with the group directly. Bang! Pow! Boom! was the first album which Clark worked on directly with Joseph Bruce and Joseph Utsler since Bizaar. Bang! Pow! Boom! was recorded between September 2008 and July 2009 at Clark's Fun House Studio. Bruce listened to music by the progressive rock band Gong for inspiration. In order to ensure the quality of their vocal recordings, Bruce and Utsler drank tea before every take and didn't smoke cannabis while recording. Much material was recorded for the album; some songs left off the initial release appeared on the "Nuclear Edition" reissue, while another song intended for Bang! Pow! Boom!, "If I Ate Your Brains", was released as part of a single for the 2009 Hallowicked concert.

== Music and lyrics ==
"There comes a time, every so often, when the Dark Carnival begins to swell with the countless souls awaiting judgement, and the thriving mob begins to tear at each other to find a place in lines that stretch out of view. And as attractions open wide to accommodate crowds frantically clawing their way inside, he will come to perform the cleansing."

— "Intro", introducing the entity Bang! Pow! Boom!

According to Bruce, the goal was to produce an album that was "very much a part of the Dark Carnival, without it being the seventh Joker's Card". Bang! Pow! Boom! was the first album to focus on this concept since Hell's Pit. The album was later revealed to be the first Joker's Card of a "second deck." Bang! Pow! Boom! is a character within the Dark Carnival which Bruce describes as a "continuous explosion that stomps his way through the crowd blowing [...] evil souls [...] to Hell". The album features a series of skits in which rednecks, pedophiles, and husbands who abuse their wives receive phone calls inviting them to the Dark Carnival, where they are promised US$100,000 for arriving.

According to Bruce, "In Yo Face" was originally titled "Pie in Yo Face", but it was decided that the final title sounded better. "The Bone" features surf rock-influenced guitars. According to Bruce, "Mike's beat for this was so fuckin' crazy sounding I had no idea what the fuck to do with it." "To Catch a Predator" was written during the mixing process, when the group realized that the album needed a song "that attacks an evil". Inspired by the television series To Catch a Predator, the song's lyrics describe Violent J luring pedophiles into his house to violently murder them. According to Bruce, "I could easily see myself killing pedophiles in real life and having no guilt. The only reason I don’t do it is because I'd probably get caught. So its nice to live it out through my music." "Boing Boing", a comedic sex-oriented rap, samples audio from a pornographic film which had previously been sampled by the group on their Tunnel of Love EP. Bruce says that the song was intended as a joke. Some fans interpreted the song as Bruce and Utsler calling themselves ugly, while others believed that they were bragging about how many women they have sex with. Bruce commented "We're not sex symbols, especially not me. If there are girls, they’re there to see Shaggy."

"I Found a Body" features lyrics similar to the plot of Weekend at Bernie's, and incorporates Bruce's singing, concluding with a "Pearl Jam style yell". "Fonz Pond" was inspired by a series of bicycle trails and paths leading to what had once been a pond, but had dried out, and was filled with garbage and rusted junk. Rumors spread about kids that died trying to pass the curve surrounding the area. Clark created a beat which sounded unlike what Bruce had initially expected, leading him to write a song about a haunted pond hidden in the woods. Bruce describes the production of "Imma Kill U" as similar to that of early albums by Ice Cube and Public Enemy. Bruce states that Utsler initially hated "Juggalo Island" when they began recording it, and said that it was "too soft" for Insane Clown Posse. Bruce maintained his confidence in the song, but promised Utsler that if he still felt the same way after the song was completed, it would be left off the album. As the recording continued, Utsler began to like the track more, and later praised the song in a phone conversation.

The lyrics of "Miracles" focus on the extraordinary events humans experience in life which often go unacknowledged, and encourages listeners to take time to look at the world and reevaluate their life. The song's music is built around an ascending synthesizer melody, and climaxes with an electric guitar solo performed by Mike E. Clark, and beatboxing by Joseph Utsler. "Chop Chop Slide" was inspired by the "Cha Cha Slide".

== Release and promotion ==
The album's title was first announced in the liner notes of Bruce's solo album The Shining. Bang! Pow! Boom! was initially announced as having an April release. Bruce and Utsler participated in a three-day photo shoot for the album's promotional images. The album's release was preceded with a nationwide in-store tour beginning in August, and followed by a 64-day tour, including the group's annual Halloween performance in Detroit. The album was released in three different color variations of the cover: red, blue, and green. Each version features its own unique introduction and hidden track. A sampler for the album was released, featuring a decoder piece for finding hidden messages in the album's artwork.

A special edition of the album, dubbed the "Nuclear Edition", was released on April 6, 2010. It features a gold cover and bonus material from each version of the album, three previously unreleased tracks, the sampler, two music videos and the documentary A Family Underground. The first music video from the album, "In Yo Face", was released on December 18, 2009. The second music video from the album, "Miracles", premiered as part of the "Nuclear Edition" reissue. A third music video from the album, "Juggalo Island", was filmed at the 2008 Gathering of the Juggalos. A fourth music video from the album, "Fonz Pond", has also been released. A fifth music video, "It's All Over" was released in December 2011.

== Reception ==
Professional ratings
Review scores
Source	Rating
AllMusic	3/5 stars
Billboard	2.5/5 stars
Consequence of Sound	3.5/5 stars
The Detroit News	B
Kik Axe Music	Original: Nuclear Edition:
Washington City Paper	3.5/5

Bang! Pow! Boom! received positive reviews. AllMusic reviewer David Jeffries gave the album three out of five stars, calling it "a formulaic album from the kings of slaughterhouse rap-rock, but fans will appreciate the extra enthusiasm from the duo, the bounty of filth, and maybe most of all, the reviving of the Dark Carnival mythos." The Detroit News music critic Adam Graham gave the album a B rating, describing it as "the best material the Clowns have touched since 1999's The Amazing Jeckel Brothers."

Kik Axe Music reviewer Matt Molgaard gave the album a four out of five rating, writing that "even if you’re not a huge fan of the 'commercial' sound [...] there's plenty of grim tracks to appease the appetite of new and old fans alike." Another writer for the website, James Zahn, gave the "Nuclear Edition" reissue 4.5 out of 5.

Washington City Paper writer Andrew Noz gave the album "three and a half 20 oz. Faygo bottles out of five". Consequence of Sound reviewer David Buchanan notes the change to a more positive sound as universally appealing while also noting the comeback of Dark Carnival references as a selling point for long-time fans, giving the album 3.5 stars out of 5. Mike E. Clark received praise for the album's production, which David Jeffries described as "inventive", and Adam Graham described as being "packed with enough hooks, chants and stellar riffs to tide the Juggalo Nation over through a year's supply of Faygo."

== Chart performance ==
Bang! Pow! Boom! debuted at number 1 on the Billboard Top Independent Albums chart and number 4 on the Billboard 200 selling 50,000 copies in its first week. In 2010, the "Nuclear Edition" charted at No. 55 on the Billboard 200, following the release of the "Miracles" music video. By February 2010, the album had sold over 100,000 copies. By October 8, 2010, the album had surpassed the group's previous release, The Tempest, in sales by almost 50,000 copies.

== Legacy ==
The music video for "Miracles" has become viral. On April 17, 2010 Saturday Night Live aired a sketch which parodied the video. In the sketch, fictional personalities DJ Supersoak and Lil' Blaster debuted a fictional music video by the Thrilla Killa Klownz called "Magical Mysteries" as part of Under Underground Records' "Underground Rock Minute". The fictional video featured Ryan Phillippe and Bobby Moynihan rapping about things such as "where the sun hides at night" and blankets. Saturday Night Live had previously parodied Psychopathic Records in 2009. Insane Clown Posse called the "Miracles" parody "a huge honor."

== Track listing ==
Blue cover
No.	Title	Writer(s)	Performer(s)	Length
1.	"Intro"	Jumpsteady	Andrew Montesi	1:25
2.	"Beautiful Doom"	ICP and Mike E. Clark	ICP	3:05
3.	"In Yo Face"	ICP and Mike E. Clark	ICP	4:07
4.	"The Bone"	ICP and Mike E. Clark	ICP	3:54
5.	"Zombie Slide"	ICP and Mike E. Clark	ICP	3:27
6.	"To Catch a Predator"	ICP and Mike E. Clark	ICP	5:21
7.	"Boing Boing"	ICP and Mike E. Clark	ICP	4:46
8.	"I Found a Body"	ICP and Mike E. Clark	ICP	5:46
9.	"Love"	ICP and Mike E. Clark	ICP	3:16
10.	"Fonz Pond"	ICP and Mike E. Clark	ICP	4:03
11.	"Imma Kill U"	ICP and Mike E. Clark	ICP	4:31
12.	"Juggalo Island"	ICP and Mike E. Clark	ICP	4:58
13.	"Vultures"	ICP and Mike E. Clark	ICP	4:51
14.	"Vera Lee"	ICP and Mike E. Clark	ICP	5:17
15.	"Miracles"	ICP and Mike E. Clark	ICP	5:13
16.	"Bang! Pow! Boom!" (Contains the hidden track "Over a Bitch")	ICP and Mike E. Clark	ICP	11:42
Total length:				75:42

Green cover
No.	Title	Writer(s)	Performer(s)	Length
1.	"Intro"	Jumpsteady	Andrew Montesi	1:25
2.	"The Clowns are Back"	ICP and Mike E. Clark	ICP	2:29
3.	"In Yo Face"	ICP and Mike E. Clark	ICP	4:07
4.	"The Bone"	ICP and Mike E. Clark	ICP	3:54
5.	"Zombie Slide"	ICP and Mike E. Clark	ICP	3:27
6.	"To Catch a Predator"	ICP and Mike E. Clark	ICP	5:21
7.	"Boing Boing"	ICP and Mike E. Clark	ICP	4:46
8.	"I Found a Body"	ICP and Mike E. Clark	ICP	5:46
9.	"Love"	ICP and Mike E. Clark	ICP	3:16
10.	"Fonz Pond"	ICP and Mike E. Clark	ICP	4:03
11.	"Imma Kill U"	ICP and Mike E. Clark	ICP	4:31
12.	"Juggalo Island"	ICP and Mike E. Clark	ICP	4:58
13.	"Vultures"	ICP and Mike E. Clark	ICP	4:51
14.	"Vera Lee"	ICP and Mike E. Clark	ICP	5:17
15.	"Miracles"	ICP and Mike E. Clark	ICP	5:13
16.	"Bang! Pow! Boom!" (Contains the hidden track "Chop Chop Slide")	ICP and Mike E. Clark	ICP	13:19
Total length:				76:43

Red cover
No.	Title	Writer(s)	Performer(s)	Length
1.	"Intro"	Jumpsteady	Andrew Montesi	1:25
2.	"Freaky Creep Show"	ICP and Mike E. Clark	ICP	2:56
3.	"In Yo Face"	ICP and Mike E. Clark	ICP	4:07
4.	"The Bone"	ICP and Mike E. Clark	ICP	3:54
5.	"Zombie Slide"	ICP and Mike E. Clark	ICP	3:27
6.	"To Catch a Predator"	ICP and Mike E. Clark	ICP	5:21
7.	"Boing Boing"	ICP and Mike E. Clark	ICP	4:46
8.	"I Found a Body"	ICP and Mike E. Clark	ICP	5:46
9.	"Love"	ICP and Mike E. Clark	ICP	3:16
10.	"Fonz Pond"	ICP and Mike E. Clark	ICP	4:03
11.	"Imma Kill U"	ICP and Mike E. Clark	ICP	4:31
12.	"Juggalo Island"	ICP and Mike E. Clark	ICP	4:58
13.	"Vultures"	ICP and Mike E. Clark	ICP	4:51
14.	"Vera Lee"	ICP and Mike E. Clark	ICP	5:17
15.	"Miracles"	ICP and Mike E. Clark	ICP	5:13
16.	"Bang! Pow! Boom!" (Contains the hidden track "Our Hero")	ICP and Mike E. Clark	ICP	11:42
Total length:				75:33

Nuclear Edition (Disc 1: Audio CD)
No.	Title	Writer(s)	Performer(s)	Length
1.	"Intro"	Jumpsteady	Andrew Montesi	1:25
2.	"Triple Threat Mix (Beautiful Doom, Freaky Creep Show, The Clowns are Back)"	ICP and Mike E. Clark	ICP	5:17
3.	"In Yo Face"	ICP and Mike E. Clark	ICP	4:07
4.	"The Bone"	ICP and Mike E. Clark	ICP	3:54
5.	"Zombie Slide"	ICP and Mike E. Clark	ICP	3:27
6.	"To Catch a Predator"	ICP and Mike E. Clark	ICP	5:21
7.	"Boing Boing"	ICP and Mike E. Clark	ICP	4:46
8.	"I Found a Body"	ICP and Mike E. Clark	ICP	5:46
9.	"Love"	ICP and Mike E. Clark	ICP	3:16
10.	"Fonz Pond"	ICP and Mike E. Clark	ICP	4:03
11.	"Imma Kill U"	ICP and Mike E. Clark	ICP	4:31
12.	"Juggalo Island"	ICP and Mike E. Clark	ICP	4:58
13.	"Vultures"	ICP and Mike E. Clark	ICP	4:51
14.	"Vera Lee"	ICP and Mike E. Clark	ICP	5:17
15.	"Miracles"	ICP and Mike E. Clark	ICP	5:13
16.	"Bang! Pow! Boom!"	ICP and Mike E. Clark	ICP	6:36
Total length:				71:53

Nuclear Edition (Disc 2: Audio CD)
No.	Title	Writer(s)	Performer(s)	Length
1.	"Over a Bitch"	ICP and Mike E. Clark	ICP	4:12
2.	"Our Hero"	ICP and Mike E. Clark	ICP	4:07
3.	"Chop Chop Slide"	ICP and Mike E. Clark	ICP	6:02
4.	"Supernatural"	ICP and Mike E. Clark	ICP	3:39
5.	"Tonight"	ICP and Mike E. Clark	ICP	3:27
6.	"It's All Over"	ICP and Mike E. Clark	ICP	4:24
7.	"Bang! Pow! Boom! Samplers"	ICP and Mike E. Clark	ICP	11:05
Total length:				36:56

Nuclear Edition (Disc 3: Video DVD)
No.	Title	Writer(s)	Performer(s)	Length
1.	"In Yo Face" (music video)	ICP and Mike E. Clark	ICP	4:15
2.	"Miracles" (music video)	ICP and Mike E. Clark	ICP	4:21
3.	"A Family Underground" (juggalo documentary)	Paul Andresen		85:25

== Personnel ==
Musicians

- Violent J – vocals, skit vocals, lyrics
- Shaggy 2 Dope – vocals, skit vocals, lyrics
- Mike E. Clark – programming, skit vocals, producer, engineer, mixing
- Razor Ray – guitar on "Bang! Pow! Boom!"
- Rich "Legz Diamond" Murrel – skit vocals
- Michelle "Sugar Slam" Rapp – skit vocals
- Dan Diamond – skit vocals
- Martin Gross – skit vocals
- Carlos "Southwest Sol" Guadarrama – skit vocals
- Wako – skit vocals
- Awesome Dre – skit vocals
- Corporal Robinson – skit vocals
- Brian Kuma – skit vocals

Production

- Bill Kozy – mix engineer
- Eric Davie – skit vocals, assistant engineer
- Todd Fairall – assistant engineer
- Jim Kissling – mastering
- Gary Arnett – artwork, graphic design
- Dan Christie – artwork, graphic design
- Jon Bowling – artwork, graphic design
- John Eder – photography
- Charles Green – prop design

== Chart positions ==
=== Original version ===
Chart (2009)	Peak position
US Billboard 200	4
US Billboard Independent Albums	1
US Billboard Rap Albums	3

=== Nuclear edition ===
Chart (2010)	Peak position
US Billboard 200	55
US Billboard Alternative Albums	30
US Billboard Rock Albums	1

== Bang! Pow! Boom! Tour ==
Insane Clown Posse promoted the tour for Bang! Pow! Boom! in the pamphlet of the album. The first part of the tour kicked off on September 15, 2009, and concluded on October 31, 2009, at ICP's annual Hallowicked Show. The second part of the tour kicked off on November 7, 2009, and concluded on December 18, 2009. Hed pe, The Dayton Family and Knotheads were the supporting artists on the tour.

The first leg featured performances by Chop Shop, The Dayton Family, Hed (pe) & Insane Clown Posse.
