= The Tempest (album) =

Studio album by Insane Clown Posse
- Released: March 20, 2007
- Recorded: 2006
- Studios: The Lotus Pod (Detroit, Michigan); The Haunted Cabin Studios (Detroit); The Fun House (Detroit)
- Genre: Horrorcore
- Length: 59:36
- Label: Psychopathic
- Producer: Mike E. Clark

Insane Clown Posse chronology
Hell's Pit (2004)	The Tempest (2007)	Bang! Pow! Boom! (2009)

The Tempest is the tenth studio album by American hip hop duo Insane Clown Posse. It was released on March 20, 2007, through Psychopathic Records. Recording sessions took place at the Lotus Pod, The Haunted Cabin Studios and The Fun House in Detroit. Production was entirely handled by Mike E. Clark, marking his return after he had a falling-out with the duo in 2000. However, he did not collaborate directly with ICP, and would not do so until their 2009 album Bang! Pow! Boom!

The album's concept compares a violent storm to a roller coaster; its lyrical themes vary from horrorcore-based character deconstructions and songs about the supernatural to humorous and lighter subject matter. Clark's production was praised by critics, and the album peaked at number 20 on the Billboard 200. It is the group's 23rd overall release.

== History ==
Mike E. Clark produced much of Insane Clown Posse discography, as well as working with other groups on Psychopathic Records. He worked with both the band and the record label until he had a falling-out with ICP in 2000; this was after completing ICP's album's Bizaar and Bizzar, and beginning production on the Dark Lotus debut album Tales from the Lotus Pod.

After becoming a full-time producer for Kid Rock, Clark contracted pneumonia, but ignored the illness, and began coughing severely as he awoke, leading to a three-month stay in Mount Clemens General Hospital, during which one of his lungs collapsed three times. As the result of his near-death experience, Clark decided to reconcile with Violent J and Shaggy 2 Dope. Phone conversations between Clark and Insane Clown Posse led to Clark producing Shaggy 2 Dope's 2006 solo album F.T.F.O.. The following year, Clark produced The Tempest; however, in both instances, he did not work with Psychopathic Records directly. Because of this, ICP felt that The Tempest was missing the collaborative element that they felt made their earlier albums enjoyable. Clark would not work directly with Psychopathic Records until 2009's Bang! Pow! Boom!

== Music and lyrics ==
Unlike previous Insane Clown Posse albums, The Tempest is not connected to the Dark Carnival mythology, which formed the basis for ICP's "Joker's Cards" series, which began in 1992 with Carnival of Carnage and concluded with the albums The Wraith: Shangri-La and Hell's Pit; however, it references themes, concepts and songs from previous albums. Violent J said that The Tempest is a concept album in its own right. Violent J describes the album's concept as relating to both a violent storm which turns into a tornado and pulls people into a hurricane as well as a roller coaster. According to Violent J, "That's a lot like riding on a violent roller coaster, I'd assume. You get jerked to the left, jerked to the right, sucked way up into the sky, and then you go shooting down to the floor, and then you jerk up to the left and then you whip around to the right. Well, The Tempest is a storm in the form of a roller coaster". As a result of this concept, the album focuses on a variety of different moods.

The Tempest maintains much of the horrorcore lyrical content ICP is known for, as well as their humorous perspective. Unlike previous albums, this album does not contain any disses aimed at other rappers or music industry figures. Violent J and Shaggy 2 Dope's rapping on this album is described by AllMusic reviewer David Jeffries as being delivered in "a carnival barker fashion that fits with their circus motif", and contrasted Violent J and Shaggy 2 Dope themselves as being like "Alice Cooper with a mallrat attitude".

The lyrics of "Growing Again", which describe Violent J growing into a giant, were inspired by Violent J's weight gain; Violent J also says that the song reflects the feeling of being able to "rap about anything we want [...] I feel we have the right for some songs to be softer and not about killing or Dark Carnival". "The Tower" describes a war veteran and expert marksman climbing a college tower and shooting people with an arsenal of weapons, a reference to Charles Whitman's 1966 murder spree.

Mike E. Clark's production incorporates elements of rock and heavy metal, as well as live instrumentation. Reviewer Lana Cooper of PopMatters compares "Ride the Tempest" to A Flock of Seagulls, and describes the instrumentation as incorporating elements of synthesizers and calliope. Cooper says that "Growing Again" incorporates power ballad chords. Jeffries describes "I Do This!" as being influenced by psychedelia, and called "Mexico City" "lowrider music".

== Release and reception ==
Professional ratings
Review scores
Source	Rating
AllMusic	3.5/5 stars
PopMatters	6/10
RapReviews	6/10

The album was released with a bonus poster. The Tempest debuted at number 20 on the U.S. Billboard 200, selling about 33,000 copies in its first week. Reviews from AllMusic and PopMatters generally appraised Mike E. Clark's production as the album's most appealing element. AllMusic's David Jeffries wrote, "there's no denying that Clark's vision does wonders for the duo". Lana Cooper of PopMatters said that "[Insane Clown Posse's] theatrics have to be given their due". The Tempest was released on vinyl on February 14, 2020.

== Track listing ==
All lyrics are written by Joseph Bruce and Joseph Utsler; all music is composed by Mike E. Clark.

No.	Title	Length
1.	"The Sky Is Falling"	3:39
2.	"Ride the Tempest"	2:51
3.	"Alley Rat"	2:11
4.	"Haunted Bumps"	3:24
5.	"Growing Again"	4:45
6.	"Hum Drum Boogie"	3:39
7.	"I Do This!"	3:28
8.	"What About Now?"	3:24
9.	"Watch My Ride"	2:42
10.	"News at 6 O'Clock"	4:06
11.	"The Tower"	4:14
12.	"The Party"	3:13
13.	"Bitch I Lied"	4:08
14.	"Play My Song"	2:55
15.	"Mexico City"	3:32
16.	"If I Was a Serial Killer"	7:30
Total length:		59:36

== Personnel ==
- Joseph "Violent J" Bruce – lyrics, vocals
- Joseph "Shaggy 2 Dope" Utsler – lyrics, vocals, scratches
- James Mitchell – additional vocals (track 2)
- Christofer Carson – additional vocals (track 5)
- Juan Ramon "Razor Ray" Reyes – additional background vocals, additional guitar
- Michael "DJ Clay" Velasquez – additional background vocals, additional scratches
- Bryan "The R.O.C." Jones – additional background vocals
- Mike E. Clark – producer, programming, recording, mixing (tracks: 2, 16), engineering
- Brian Kuma – additional producer, engineering
- Fritz "The Cat" Van Kosky – mixing (tracks: 1, 3–15)
- Jeffery Campo – mastering
- Brian Debler – artwork, design
- Cindy Wulkan – artwork, design
- Michael Scotta – artwork, design

== Charts ==
=== Weekly charts ===
Chart (2007)	Peak position
US Billboard 200	20
US Top Rock Albums (Billboard)	6
US Top Rap Albums (Billboard)	8
US Independent Albums (Billboard)	2

=== Year-end charts ===
Chart (2007)	Position
US Independent Albums (Billboard)	50
