= The Marvelous Missing Link: Found =

Studio album by Insane Clown Posse
- Released: July 31, 2015
- Recorded: Late 2014/early 2015 – mid-2015
- Genres: Pop rap; progressive pop; funk
- Length: 58:35
- Label: Psychopathic
- Producers: Otis; Mike P.; Kuma; Seven

Insane Clown Posse chronology
The Marvelous Missing Link: Lost (2015)	The Marvelous Missing Link: Found (2015)	Fearless Fred Fury (2019)

Singles from The Marvelous Missing Link: Found
- 1. "Juggalo Party" Released: July 17, 2015

The Marvelous Missing Link: Found is the fourteenth studio album and the second part of the third Joker Card in the second Deck of the Dark Carnival Saga by Insane Clown Posse. It was released on July 31, 2015, on Psychopathic Records, three months after its companion album Lost. It is the group's 35th release overall.

Professional ratings
Review scores
Source	Rating
AllMusic	3.5/5 stars
RapReviews	6.5/10

== Background ==
First word about the album was in early to mid 2013, with Violent J stating "this album is going to be "the album", ya know?" In early February 2014, with an interview with Faygoluvers.net, ICP was asked about the next Joker Card, like title, what it looks like, and they said that they definitely have the title, and were putting on the finishing touches on the final print of what it will look like. ICP released the name and face of the album on their 20th anniversary Hallowicked show, on October 31, 2014. The album was originally scheduled to be released on Psychopathic Records on July 28, 2015; however, due to the recent change in which albums are now being released on Fridays, its release was changed to July 31, 2015. In a February 21, 2015, interview with Billboard, ICP stated "that this album will have the comedy, and more upbeat songs on it".

== Promotion ==
In the November 27, 2014 edition of the Hatchet Herald, it was announced that The Missing Link merchandise will be on sale at ICP's annual "Big Ballas Party" with Kottonmouth Kings on December 20. In late December 2014, it was announced that The Missing Link merchandise was now available on Psychopathics official online store "Hatchetgear.com". In an interview on February 21, 2015, ICP stated that they will go on tour to promote The Marvelous Missing Link: Found some time in September 2015 through October 2015 concluding at their 21st Annual Hallowicked 2015 concert.

In the May 22, 2015, Hatchet Herald it was announced that the album would be released on July 31, 2015, to comply with the national release date changing from Tuesdays to Fridays. The album is still scheduled to be released at the Gathering Of The Juggalos. On June 25, 2015, it was announced that the album is being distributed by RED, and there will be a nationwide tour, interviews and more in promoting for The Marvelous Missing Link: Lost and The Marvelous Missing Link: Found, after FOUND is released. They will be stacking up how well this album is against the other half, The Marvelous Missing Link: Lost. Songs from the album were played during ICP's set at the 2015 Gathering of the Juggalos, which runs July 22–25 at Legend Valley, in Thornville, Ohio. On the July 3, 2015, edition of the Psychopathic Radio show, "The Juggalo Show", Jumpsteady revealed that the 2015 Gathering pendant is The Marvelous Missing Link: Found. Starting July 17, pre-ordering the album digitally will get you the brand new single "Juggalo Party", with the rest of the album downloading the 31st.

== Production ==
The album was produced by Seven of Strange Music along with in-house producers Otis of Axe Murder Boyz, guitarist Mike Puwal (a.k.a. Mike P.) of Zug Izland, and Kuma.

In an interview with faygoluvers.net on July 16, 2015, Brian Kuma stated that he, Young Wicked, Seven, and Mike P. are producers of the album saying ICP wanted to keep the same producers for both albums, but producers that would help create a new sound for both the albums.

== Release ==
The album was released on July 31, 2015, and initially released at the 2015 GOTJ. June 16, 2015, with the posting of the 2015 gathering program on Juggalogathering.com it was announced that The Marvelous Missing Link: Lost and The Marvelous Missing Link: Found will be released on a 4 LP vinyl on September 18, 2015. On July 16, 2015, on New Zealand's iTunes website, the track list for The Marvelous Missing Link: Found was released, and announced on faygoluvers.net.

ICP said that the outtakes from the recording sessions would be released on their online store hatchetgear.com, also it was said that they will also release a cd full of songs that did not make the cut.

== The Marvelous Missing Link Tour ==
On August 22, 2013 ICP released the first few dates of the tour. On August 24, 2015, the tour flyer for The Marvelous Missing Link was released, also it was announced that the first part of the tour is scheduled to kick off on October 3, 2015 (at Rob Zombies "Great American Bash"), and conclude on October 31, 2015 (at their annual Hallowicked Show). The supporting artists for the tour are: P.O.D., Stitches, Young Wicked (who is supporting his debut album on PSY, Slaughter), and Dope D.O.D. More dates being announced for the second half of the tour after Hallowicked.

== Track listing ==
No.	Title	Producer(s)	Length
1.	"Intro"		1:44
2.	"Found"	Seven	3:41
3.	"Get Clowned"	Kuma	4:20
4.	"OK"	Otis	3:40
5.	"Lost at the Carnival"	Otis	5:03
6.	"Mr. White Suit"	Seven	4:07
7.	"Pineapple Pizza"	Mike P.	3:12
8.	"Juggalo Party"	Seven, Kuma	4:25
9.	"The Midway"	Seven	4:02
10.	"I Fucked a Cop"	Otis	3:54
11.	"The World is Yours"	Seven	4:55
12.	"Dreams of Grandeur"	Mike P.	2:53
13.	"I'm Sweet"	Otis, Kuma	6:10
14.	"Time"	Seven	5:59
Total length:			58:35

=== The Marvelous Missing Link: Outtakes ===
(songs in bold are left over from The Marvelous Missing Link: Found)

No.	Title	Length
1.	"Lost Intro"	1:24
2.	"The Missing Link"	4:02
3.	"Six Pedophiles"	4:31
4.	"The Monster"	3:45
5.	"Why'd I Have To Die?"	5:08
6.	"Joey The Butcher"	3:10
7.	"The Dream"	5:20
8.	"Found Intro"	1:29
9.	"Let Loose"	3:13
10.	"Dead Heather"	3:06
11.	"The Carousel"	4:27
12.	"Hooker"	2:36
13.	"I'm Sorry"	3:37
14.	"Immortal"	4:28
Total length:		49:06

== Personnel ==
=== Vocals and lyrics ===
- Violent J – Vocals, Lyrics
- Shaggy 2 Dope – Vocals, Lyrics
- Jumpsteady – Vocals (1)
- Young Wicked – Additional vocals (3, 5, 9, 10) (Additional lyrics – 2, 4, 6, 7, 8, 11, 12, 14) (Skit music – 13)
- Big Hoodoo – Additional vocals (3)
- Sugar Slam – Additional vocals (4, 6, 8, 11, 14)
- Courtney Desmet – Additional vocals (4)
- Chop – Additional vocals (8, 10)

=== Production ===
- Michael "Seven" Summers (2, 6, 8, 9, 11, 14)
- Brian Kuma (3) (Additional production on 8, 13)
- Otis/Young Wicked (4, 5, 10, 11,13)
- Mike P. (7, 12)

== Charts ==
Chart (2015)	Peak position
US Billboard 200	136
US Independent Albums (Billboard)	9
US Top Rap Albums (Billboard)	9
US R&B/Hip-Hop	13
US Tastemakers	13
US Top Album Sales	58
