= The Naught =

Studio album by Insane Clown Posse
- Released: August 12, 2025
- Genres: Horrorcore; rap rock
- Length: 66:17
- Label: Psychopathic
- Producers: ShaggyTheAirhead; Mike E. Clark; Brian Kuma; Devereaux; Mike Puwal; DJ Clay; ICP

Insane Clown Posse chronology
Yum Yum Bedlam (2021)	The Naught (2025)

The Naught is the seventeenth studio album by American hip hop duo Insane Clown Posse (ICP), and their sixth "Joker Card" in the second deck of their Dark Carnival universe. The album was released on August 12, 2025, on Psychopathic Records during the 2025 Gathering of the Juggalos. Critical reception was mixed.

== Release ==
The release was announced in July 2025 through an AI-generated video.

The album was presented as a "dark and provocative chapter in the ever-expanding mythology of the Joker’s Cards. Twisted with wicked rhymes, carnival chaos, and deep introspection, The Naught confronts the shadows within—the part of the soul we pretend isn’t there." In an interview with Metro Times, Violent J indicated that the album was very different from all the rest of the band's production and said: "That album literally means nothing — literally. It means “nothing.” The first six Joker’s Cards ended with the choice of Heaven and Hell — it ended with Shangri-La and it ended with Hell’s Pit, two different albums."

The album was released on August 12, 2025, on Psychopathic Records becoming the band's seventeenth studio album, and their sixth (and apparently final) "Joker Card" in the second deck of their Dark Carnival universe.

== Reception ==
Reviewing the album with MC Snax, MC Lars praised its nihilistic packaging and approach of the theme of time. On episode 238 of the podcast Why I Hate This Album, Garrett Harvey and Timothy Richardson reviewed The Naught and stated: ”Fair warning, it isn't all Faygo and murder this time dear listeners. These clowns are getting older and beginning to fill their songs with existential dread and fears about their own mortality (it's pretty funny).” A review on Ottic.de concluded: "The few moments that connect—“Everybody Dies,” “Happy Fun Day”—prove ICP remain capable of spectacle, but the album as a whole suggests a duo at odds with their own mythology. If this is the end, it’s an ending defined not by revelation but by entropy. Perhaps that, unintentionally, is the most fitting lesson of the Dark Carnival: not every story ends in clarity, only in the echo of chaos."

== Track listing ==
All lyrics are written by Joseph Bruce and Joseph Utsler.

The Naught track listing
No.	Title	Producer(s)	Length
1.	"Intro"	Mike Puwal	2:02
2.	"The Naught"	ShaggyTheAirhead	4:08
3.	"Watch Me"	Mike E. Clark	4:20
4.	"Everybody Dies"	Mike E. Clark	6:10
5.	"Happy Fun Day"	Mike E. Clark	3:31
6.	"Only Wicked Shit"	Kuma	3:36
7.	"Flashback 1"	ShaggyTheAirhead	1:24
8.	"Dead Kelly"	Kuma	5:57
9.	"Here We Go"	ShaggyTheAirhead	2:50
10.	"Cinnamon Pigtails"	Mike E. Clark	3:27
11.	"I'm Still Breathin'"	Devereaux	3:52
12.	"Pop Out"	Kuma, DJ Clay, ICP	2:24
13.	"Flashback 2"	ShaggyTheAirhead	1:52
14.	"Throw 'Em Up"	Brian Kuma	3:48
15.	"Softy Pillow Man"	Mike E. Clark	4:30
16.	"I'm Fallin'"	ShaggyTheAirhead	6:01
17.	"While It Lasts"	ShaggyTheAirhead	6:18
Total length:			66:17
