= Insane Clown Posse =

American hip-hop duo

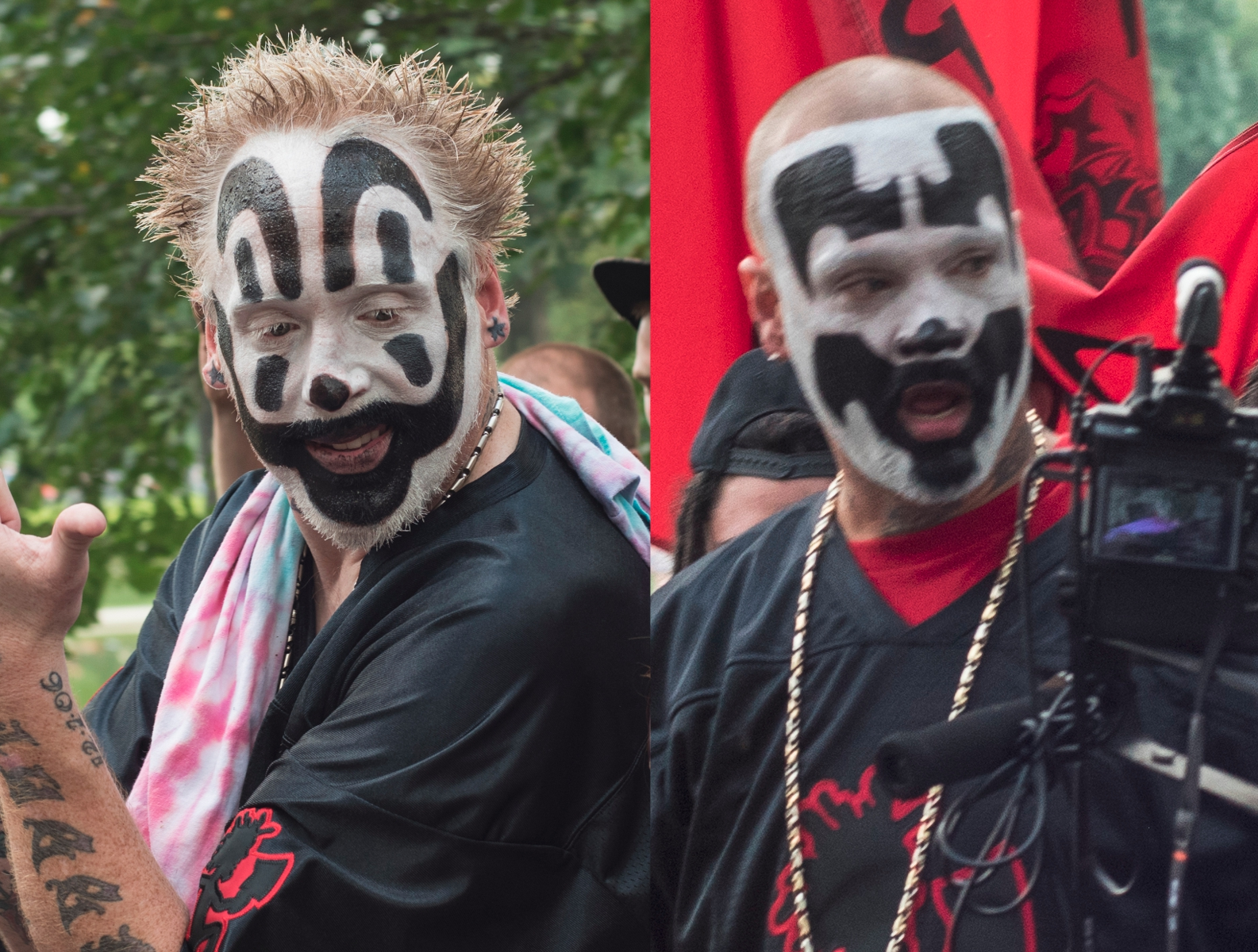
- Violent J (left) and Shaggy 2 Dope, 2017

Background information
- Also known as: ICP; Inner City Posse; JJ Boyz; The Bloody Brothers
- Origin: Detroit, Michigan, U.S.
- Genres: Hip-hop; horrorcore; rap rock
- Years active: 1989–present
- Labels: Psychopathic; Jive; Hollywood; Island; The Island Def Jam Music Group
- Members: Violent J; Shaggy 2 Dope
- Past members: D–Lyrical; Kid Villain; John Kickjazz; Greez-E
- Website: Official website

Insane Clown Posse, often abbreviated as ICP, is an American hip-hop duo. Formed in Detroit in 1989, ICP's best-known lineup consists of rappers Violent J (Joseph Bruce) and Shaggy 2 Dope (Joseph Utsler). Insane Clown Posse performs a style of hardcore hip-hop known as horrorcore and is known for its elaborate live performances. The duo has earned two platinum and five gold albums. According to Nielsen SoundScan, the entire catalog of the group had sold 6.5 million units in the United States and Canada as of April 2007. The group has established a dedicated following called Juggalos numbering in the "tens of thousands".

Originally known as JJ Boyz and Inner City Posse, the group introduced supernatural and horror-themed lyrics as a means of distinguishing itself stylistically. The duo founded the independent record label Psychopathic Records with Alex Abbiss as manager, and produced and starred in the feature films Big Money Hustlas and Big Money Rustlas. They formed their own professional wrestling promotion, Juggalo Championship Wrestling, and have collaborated with many hip-hop and rock musicians.

The songs of Insane Clown Posse center thematically on the mythology of the Dark Carnival, a metaphoric limbo in which the lives of the dead are judged by one of several entities. The Dark Carnival is elaborated through a series of stories called Joker's Cards, each of which offers a specific lesson designed to change the "evil ways" of listeners before "the end consumes us all".

== History ==
=== 1985–1994: Early history ===
Joseph Bruce (Violent J) and Joseph Utsler (Shaggy 2 Dope) met in Oak Park, a suburb on the north border of Detroit, Michigan. Along with Utsler's brother, John, and friend, Lacy, they wrestled in backyard rings that they had built themselves. The pair also shared an interest in hip-hop, including artists like 3rd Bass, Beastie Boys, N.W.A and local rappers such as Awesome Dre. In 1989, Joseph Bruce as Jagged Joe, Joseph Utsler as Kangol Joe and John Utsler as Master J, released the single titled "Party at the Top of the Hill" under the name of JJ Boys, but the group did not pursue a serious career in music. Poverty and a difficult home life drove Bruce to move in with Rudy "The Rude Boy" Hill in River Rouge, a city near the industrial southwest side of Detroit.

Feeling a sense of home and belonging, Bruce formed a gang called Inner City Posse, which was composed of Joseph Utsler, Rudy Hill, other friends of Bruce, and a number of other connections he had made in Southwest Detroit. Bruce was jailed for ninety days in 1989–1990 for death threats, robbery, and violating probation; this experience convinced him to reduce his involvement in gang life. Bruce began his professional wrestling career after getting out of jail, and it was at his first show that he met Rob Van Dam and Sabu, two other first-timers with whom he became very good friends. During this time Bruce brought Utsler backstage with him, and all four became close friends.

Bruce became frustrated with the backstage politics of the wrestling business and began searching for another career. Back on the streets, Bruce, Utsler and Utsler's brother John performed hip-hop music at local nightclubs, using the stage names Violent J, 2 Dope, and John Kickjazz, under the name of their gang, Inner City Posse. Seeing a need for a manager, Bruce's brother Robert recommended his friend and record store owner Alex Abbiss, who established the Psychopathic Records record label with the group in 1991. Later that year the group released the self-produced EP titled Dog Beats.

According to Alex Abbiss, Chris Mclellan, then programming director of WJLB, declined to play the EP's single "Dog Beats" because Inner City Posse's members were white. While trying to get stations to play the single, Bruce learned that one of the stations he and Abbiss visited would be interviewing local rapper Esham, who Bruce considered to be a "superstar"; Bruce had recently begun to collect Esham's albums, as he had done with other local rappers; by the time he had discovered Esham, the rapper had released two full-length albums and three EPs. Bruce met Esham for the first time at the station and praised him. Esham wished Bruce well and Bruce gave the rapper a copy of Dog Beats; this began the friendship and professional relationship between Psychopathic Records and Esham's label, Reel Life Productions. Growing popularity in the local music scene turned negative for the group's gang, which became the target of growing violence. After receiving jail sentences, the group members abandoned gang life.

In late 1991, the group had the problem of having spent more money on production than was covered by returns. The group decided that its gangsta rap style was the cause: most emcees at the time used similar styles, making it difficult for Inner City Posse to distinguish itself stylistically. Referring to local rapper Esham's horrorcore style, Bruce suggested the duo adapt this genre, in a bid to have Detroit represent acid rap, much as Los Angeles represented gangsta rap. The group agreed, but not to copy the style of Esham closely. Instead, they suggested using horror-themed lyrics as an emotional outlet for all their negative life experiences. They were also unanimous in deciding not to rap openly about Satan, which Esham often did.

After the change in musical style, the group decided it needed a new name. Utsler suggested keeping the "I.C.P." initials to inform the community that Inner City Posse was not defunct. Several names were considered before Bruce recalled his dream of a clown running around in Delray, which became the inspiration for the group's new name: Insane Clown Posse. The group decided they would all don face paint due to the success of their former clown-painted hype man. Upon returning home that night, Bruce says he had a dream in which "spirits in a traveling carnival appeared to him" – an image that would become the basis for the Dark Carnival mythology detailed in the group's Joker's Cards series.

=== 1992–2004: First Joker Card Deck ===
==== 1992–1993: Carnival of Carnage era ====
The group began recording their debut album, Carnival of Carnage, with producer Chuck Miller. After recording only three songs for $6,000 with Miller, Alex Abbiss made his first major managerial move by finding another producer, Mike E. Clark. The group finished recording the album with Clark, who continued to work with them throughout their career. The album featured appearances from local rappers, including Esham and Kid Rock. Just weeks prior to the release of their album, John left the group because he felt that it was "taking up too much of [his] life". When Bruce and Utsler attempted to call a meeting to talk about the issues, John did not attend.

"Ghetto Freak Show" (sample)
"Ghetto Freak Show", from the group's 1992 album Carnival of Carnage.

Carnival of Carnage was released on October 18, 1992, with distribution within a 120-mile (190-kilometer) radius of Detroit. Allmusic reviewer Stephen Thomas Erlewine compared the group's performance on the album to "a third-rate Beastie Boys supported by a cut-rate Faith No More, all tempered with the sensibility that made Gwar cult heroes—only with...more sexism and jokes that...wind up sounding racist". The follow-up EP, Beverly Kills 50187, sold well and gained a larger audience. Beverly Kills 50187 featured Greez-E, a fan that the ICP met earlier that year, as a replacement for John Kickjazz. During a live performance of the song "The Juggla", Bruce addressed the audience as Juggalos, and the positive response resulted in the group using the word thereafter. Greez-E left the group after the EP was released. The word has been the subject of criticism from both Ben Sisario of Rolling Stone and Allmusic's Erlewine, who suggested the term is similar to the racial slur jigaboo.

==== 1994: Ringmaster era ====
The group's second studio album, Ringmaster, was released on March 8, 1994, and its popularity enabled the group to sell out larger nightclubs across Detroit. Because Bruce and Utsler made reference to the Detroit-produced soft drink Faygo in their songs, they "figured it would be cool to have some on stage with [them]". During a concert in 1993, Utsler threw an open bottle of Faygo at a row of concertgoers who were giving them the finger. After receiving a positive response, Bruce and Utsler have since continued to spray Faygo onto audiences. A subsequent national tour increased sales of the album, earning Ringmaster a gold certification. The group's second EP, The Terror Wheel, was released on August 5, 1994. One of the songs from the EP, "Dead Body Man", received considerable local radio play. The same year marked their first "Hallowicked" concert, which has since continued annually on Halloween night in Detroit.

==== 1995: Riddle Box era ====
In 1995, Bruce and Utsler attempted to obtain a contract with a major record label. The duo eventually signed a contract with the short-lived Jive Records sub-label Battery Records, which released the group's third studio album, Riddle Box, on October 10, 1995. After Battery/Jive Records showed little interest in promoting the album, Insane Clown Posse funded the promotion of Riddle Box independently. This effort led the group to Dallas, Texas, where it persuaded several music retail stores to stock the album. Sales averaged 1,500 copies per week as a result.

==== 1996–1998: The Great Milenko era ====
Manager Alex Abbiss negotiated a contract with the Disney-owned label Hollywood Records, which reportedly paid $1 million to purchase the Insane Clown Posse contract from Battery/Jive/BMG Records. The group started recording its fourth studio album, The Great Milenko, in 1996, during which Disney requested that the tracks "The Neden Game", "Under the Moon", and "Boogie Woogie Wu" be removed. Disney also asked that the lyrics of other tracks be changed, threatening to not release the album otherwise. Bruce and Utsler complied with Disney's request, and planned to go on a national tour with House of Krazees and Myzery as their opening acts.

During a music store autograph signing, Insane Clown Posse was notified that Hollywood Records had recalled the album within hours of its release, despite having sold 18,000 copies and reaching No.63 on the Billboard 200. The group was also informed that its in-store signings and nationwide tour had been canceled, and commercials for the album and the music video for "Halls of Illusions" (which had reached No. 1 on The Box video request channel) were pulled from television, and the group was dropped from the label. It was later revealed that Disney was being criticized by the Southern Baptist Convention at the time because of Disney's promotion of "Gay Days" at Disneyland, in addition to presiding over the gay-themed television sitcom Ellen. The Convention accused Disney of turning its back on "family values". Although Abbiss told the press that Disney had stopped production of The Great Milenko to avoid further controversy, Disney claimed instead that the release of the album was an oversight by their review board, and that the album "did not fit the Disney image" because of its "inappropriate" lyrics, which they claimed were offensive to women.

After the termination of the Hollywood Records contract, Insane Clown Posse signed a new contract with Island/PolyGram Records, which agreed to release the album as intended. Entertainment Weekly music critic David Browne gave the record a C-minus rating: "[With] its puerile humor and intentionally ugly metal-rap tunes, the album feels oddly dated". The Great Milenko was certified platinum with over 1.7 million copies sold. One of the group's first projects with Island Records was an hour-long documentary titled Shockumentary, which aired on MTV. The station initially refused to play the documentary, but Island Records persuaded them to air it as a personal favor. Shockumentary helped increase album sales from 17,000 to 50,000 copies per week. Island also rereleased the group's first two albums, as well as a 2-CD compilation album composed of rare songs and demos titled "Forgotten Freshness Vol. 1".

==== Nationwide tour ====
Two days after the Extreme Championship Wrestling (ECW) program, Insane Clown Posse began its rescheduled nationwide tour with House of Krazees and Myzery. Their first concert, held in Orlando, Florida, was hand-picked by Insane Clown Posse and free to the public. Halfway through the tour, Brian Jones of House of Krazees had a falling out with his band members. Jones left the group, forcing House of Krazees to quit the tour. The success of the tour enabled Bruce and Utsler to purchase new houses both for each other and for their families. Bruce even told his mother to quit her job because he would pay her expenses.

==== Eminem feud ====
In late 1997, Bruce took Myzery to St. Andrew's Hall. Eminem, then an unknown local emcee, approached Bruce and, according to Bruce, handed him a flyer advertising the release party for the Slim Shady EP. The flyer read, "Featuring appearances by Esham, Kid Rock, and ICP (maybe)". Bruce asked why Eminem was promoting a possible Insane Clown Posse appearance without first contacting the group. Bruce said that Eminem explained, "It says 'maybe.' Maybe you will be there; I don't know. That's why I'm asking you right now. You guys comin' to my release party, or what?" Bruce, upset over not being consulted, responded, "Fuck no, I ain't coming to your party. We might have, if you would've asked us first, before putting us on the fuckin' flyer like this." Bruce reported that Eminem attacked the group in radio interviews. Bruce and Utsler first responded by referring to Eminem's alter ego as "Slim Anus" on "85 Bucks An Hour" from Twiztid's 1997 debut, Mostasteless, and later in 1999 released a parody of Eminem's "My Name Is" entitled "Slim Anus". Eminem later released a skit on his album The Marshall Mathers LP depicting the members of Insane Clown Posse having sex with the fictional homosexual Ken Kaniff. In the skit, Kaniff asks Shaggy 2 Dope to "say my name." When Shaggy replies "Eminem," Kaniff is angered and leaves. Barbs between Insane Clown Posse and Eminem continued until the feud was ended in 2005 by hip-hop group D12 and Psychopathic Records.

==== The House of Horrors Tour ====
One month after ICP's Strangle-Mania Live, Insane Clown Posse began their second nationwide tour, "The House of Horrors Tour", with Myzery added as one of the opening acts. While searching for the second opening act, Bruce received a telephone call at his home from former House of Krazees members Jamie Spaniolo and Paul Methric, who told Bruce that the group was officially disbanded and asked to be on the tour. Spaniolo and Methric provided a demo tape containing three songs: "2nd Hand Smoke", "Diemotherfuckdie", and "How Does It Feel?" Bruce was extremely impressed, and immediately had a contract drafted with Psychopathic Records for the new group to sign. Bruce, Spaniolo, and Methric agreed on the name Twiztid. The House of Horrors Tour thus featured Insane Clown Posse, with opening groups Twiztid, Myzery, and Psycho Realm.

==== Legal troubles ====
On November 16, 1997, Bruce was arrested on an aggravated battery charge after allegedly striking an audience member thirty times with his microphone at a concert in Albuquerque, New Mexico. Bruce was held for four hours before being released on $5,000 bail. The January 1998 issue of Spin magazine ran a four-page cartoon lampooning Insane Clown Posse and Juggalos, claiming that the group was offensive "not for their obscenity, but for their stupidity". Spin likened Insane Clown Posse's stage act to "a sort of circus karaoke" and portrayed the group's fans as overweight suburbanites. On the group's website, Bruce responded to the article by stating, "I could give a fuck less".

After a show in Indianapolis, Insane Clown Posse's tour bus stopped at a Waffle House in Greenfield, Indiana. When a customer began to harass Spaniolo and Bruce, a fight broke out between the customer and all of the bands' members. Months later on June 4, 1998, Bruce and Utsler pleaded guilty to misdemeanor disorderly conduct charges (reduced from battery) in an Indiana court and were fined $200 each. Members of Twiztid, Myzery, and Psycho Realm were charged with battery. The group's tour was briefly derailed in January 1998, when their tour bus drifted off a highway and down an embankment, leaving Frank Moreno of Psycho Realm with a concussion. As a result of the accident, Insane Clown Posse postponed two shows scheduled for Cleveland, Ohio, on January 22 and 23, but honored their promise to perform on January 25 and 26. They face a lawsuit over alleged sexual harassment.

==== 1998–1999: The Amazing Jeckel Brothers era ====
On April 19, 1998, in Minneapolis, Minnesota, Bruce suffered a panic attack during a performance and was carried off stage. Bruce, who later recalled being completely "out of it", found scissors and cut off his dreadlocks. After suffering another panic attack once he returned home, Bruce opted to spend three days in a Michigan mental health program. Insane Clown Posse later cancelled the last two weeks' worth of dates on its United States tour, but subsequently launched their first European tour.

By late 1998 over one million copies of The Great Milenko had been sold, and Insane Clown Posse was ready for its fifth album, The Amazing Jeckel Brothers. Working with Mike E. Clark and Rich "Legz Diamond" Murrell, Bruce and Utsler developed their album with the highest of hopes. The group was known nationally, but were not taken very seriously. Hoping to receive the respect Bruce and Utsler felt they deserved, they planned to feature well-known, respected rappers on their album. Bruce stated outright that he wanted to involve Snoop Dogg and Ol' Dirty Bastard. They paid Snoop Dogg $40,000 to appear on the song "The Shaggy Show". Snoop Dogg also helped them contact Ol' Dirty Bastard, who was paid $30,000 for his appearance. Ol' Dirty Bastard recorded his track in a matter of two days; however, his recording consisted of nothing more than him rambling about "bitches". It took Bruce and Utsler a week to assemble just four rhymes out of his rambling, and had to re-record the track and title it "Bitches". Finally, Insane Clown Posse contacted Ice-T, who charged them only $10,000. The group felt that Ice-T's song did not belong on the album, and was instead released on a later album, Psychopathics from Outer Space.

To help increase their positive publicity, the group hired the Nasty Little Man publicity team. The team set up a photo shoot for Insane Clown Posse that was to appear on the cover of Alternative Press magazine in Cleveland. On the set of the photo shoot, a member of the publicity team approached Bruce and explained that in the song "Fuck the World", the lyric that stated "Fuck the Beastie Boys and the Dalai Lama" needed to be changed. Insulted, Bruce exclaimed that his music would not be censored again—referring to Disney's previous requirement for censorship. Nasty Little Man told Bruce that the Beastie Boys were not only clients of the company but also personal friends, and the Beastie Boys told the company to make Bruce change the lyric. In response, Bruce fired Nasty Little Man and asked its team to leave the photo shoot.

The Amazing Jeckel Brothers was released on May 25, 1999, and reached No. 4 on the Billboard album charts, and has since been certified platinum by the RIAA. Stephen Thomas Erlewine gave the album a "four out of five stars" rating, stating that "[Insane Clown Posse] actually delivered an album that comes close to fulfilling whatever promise their ridiculous, carnivalesque blend of hardcore hip-hop and shock-metal had in the first place". Rolling Stone writer Barry Walters gave the album a "two out of five stars" rating, writing that "no musical sleight of hand can disguise the fact that Shaggy and J remain the ultimate wack MCs". At the same time as The Amazing Jeckel Brothers' release, Island Records merged with Def Jam Records. It quickly became apparent to Bruce and Utsler that Def Jam Records had no interest in them. Eminem, who had begun to gain mainstream success, insulted Insane Clown Posse in interviews, tours, and the song "Till Hell Freezes Over".

==== Big Money Hustlas ====
On Insane Clown Posse's previous tour (The House of Horrors Tour), they had watched the movie Big Ballers. The group, as well as Twiztid, loved the video. After Insane Clown Posse finished its The Amazing Jeckel Brothers album, Bruce and Utsler decided to create their own movie, Big Money Hustlas, with the same low-budget comedy style as Big Ballers. Island Records gave them $250,000 to begin work on the movie. Bruce and Utsler were contacted by John Cafiero, who said that he was a fan of Insane Clown Posse, and offered to direct the movie. Insane Clown Posse asked Mick Foley to appear in the movie as "Cactus Sac", a parody of his "Cactus Jack" persona. Cafiero retained the Misfits, Fred Berry, and, at Bruce's request, Harland Williams. The script was written by Bruce, and filmed in New York City. Bruce played a crime boss and Utsler portrayed a police detective. The stage crew members, who showed their dislike for Insane Clown Posse, were a source of contention. Despite the crew striking twice, the movie was filmed in two months.

==== Woodstock '99 ====
While on "The Asylum In-store Tour", Bruce and Utsler were informed by Abbiss that they were offered $100,000 to perform at Woodstock '99. They were excited about the offer, as it indicated their impact on the music industry. Some people perceived participating in Woodstock '99 was a sell-out for the group; however, Bruce and Utsler disagreed. As Bruce explains, "[Woodstock] sold out the mainstream style for us! Woodstock never came to us and asked us to change one fuckin' thing about us or our show! They wanted ICP just as ICP is, and nothing else. If that ain't fresh, then I don't know what the fuck is!".

==== Amazing Jeckel Brothers Tour troubles ====
After Woodstock 1999, Insane Clown Posse began its "Amazing Jeckel Brothers Tour", along with musicians Biohazard, Krayzie Bone, Twiztid, Mindless Self Indulgence, and Coal Chamber. Biohazard, Mindless Self Indulgence, Krayzie Bone, and Twiztid were well received by audiences; however, Coal Chamber was not. Insane Clown Posse fans were not purchasing tickets, as they did not like Coal Chamber. For the three shows that Coal Chamber played, there were multiple ticket refunds. Bruce and his brother, Rob, made the decision to eliminate Coal Chamber from the tour. After doing so, there were no tickets returned for the remainder of the tour dates. Bruce and Utsler claimed that Coal Chamber had been removed from the tour because of equipment problems, but later revealed the true reason for their actions on The Howard Stern Show, which aired August 19, 1999. Bruce continued by saying, "Nobody will tell you that, because everybody's afraid of your crumpet-ass bitch manager". Later that night, Stern contacted Bruce and Utsler, asking them to appear on his show the following day to talk with Coal Chamber's manager, Sharon Osbourne.

Before the show went on air, Osbourne bet Bruce and Utsler $50,000 that Insane Clown Posse's next album would not even sell 200,000 copies – a bet that Bruce accepted. On air Osbourne informed Bruce and Utsler that Coal Chamber filed a lawsuit for breach of contract. Osbourne stated that her group was to receive $12,500 per show for a scheduled two-month package tour. Bruce reiterated that Coal Chamber's music did not appeal to Insane Clown Posse fans, and that ticket refunds decreased after Coal Chamber had been removed from the tour. Osbourne then made public the bet with Bruce about Insane Clown Posse's next album, also stating that the duo would be subsequently dropped from their distributor. In Osbourne's words, "You're dead. Your career is over." Bruce predicted that the group's next album would sell at least 500,000 copies; however, the bet officially stood at 200,000 copies as agreed by both Bruce and Osbourne backstage.

==== 2000–2001: Bizaar and Bizzar era ====
On January 10, 2000, Utsler collapsed on stage during a performance at the House of Blues in Chicago and was rushed to Northwestern Memorial Hospital. He was diagnosed with flu-related symptoms and abnormally low blood sugar. As a result of the incident, the following week's concert dates were rescheduled. In June 2000, Eminem physically attacked Douglas Dail, an Insane Clown Posse affiliate, threatening him with a gun in the parking lot of a car audio store in Royal Oak, Michigan. Eminem pleaded guilty to a lesser charge in exchange for two years probation and a $10,000 fine. In July 2000, Bruce and Utsler staged the first annual Gathering of the Juggalos at the Novi Expo Center in Novi, Michigan. Described by Bruce as a "Juggalo Woodstock", the Gathering of the Juggalos was a three-day music festival that featured wrestling, games, seminars, contests, sideshows, and performances by all Psychopathic Records' artists. Also featured at the event were Vampiro – who both wrestled and performed – Project Born, and Kottonmouth Kings. On July 18, 2000, Big Money Hustlas was released direct-to-video.

After the Gathering of the Juggalos, Insane Clown Posse set out to release its sixth and seventh studio albums – Bizaar and Bizzar – as a double album. While recording the albums, the duo had a fallout with long-time producer Mike E. Clark. Bizaar and Bizzar were the last complete albums Clark would produce with Insane Clown Posse until his return in 2007. Bruce and Utsler flew to Denver, Colorado, to add the finishing touches to the albums. Bizaar and Bizzar were released on October 31, 2000, peaking at No. 20 and No. 21, respectively, on the Billboard 200. In The New Rolling Stone Album Guide, Ben Sisario wrote that the albums "qualify as ICP's masterworks of both merchandising and music". Both albums were given a "three out of five stars" rating. The combined sales were around 400,000 copies, exceeding the bet placed previously with Sharon Osbourne; Osbourne did not come through with payment for having lost the bet.

Two music videos were released from the albums: "Tilt-a-Whirl", from Bizaar, and "Let's Go All the Way", a cover of a Sly Fox song from Bizzar. MTV agreed to play "Let's Go All the Way" on their network, airing it once in the late evening. Bruce and Utsler decided to bombard Total Request Live (TRL) with requests for the video. While on their "Bizaar Bizzar Tour", Insane Clown Posse posted on its website that December 8 was the day for their fans request the video. Bruce and Utsler named that day "The Mighty Day of Lienda", meaning "The Mighty Day of All or Nothing". On December 8, Rudy Hill, Robert Bruce, Tom Dub, and six other Psychopathic Records employees and friends drove down to New York City.

They were met by nearly 400 Insane Clown Posse fans standing outside in front of the TRL studio window, all with signs supporting the duo. Thirty minutes before the show began, Viacom security guards and New York City police officers were dispatched to remove all the fans from the sidewalk. When some fans, including Robert Bruce, refused to move because it was a public street and no other individuals were asked to move, they were assaulted. All telephone requests for the video to be played were ignored, and Insane Clown Posse was never mentioned during the show. MTV later informed Island Records that the heads of the network must choose the band first before it can become eligible to be featured on TRL.

Bruce and Utsler left Island Records, signing a contract with D3 Entertainment to distribute every release on Psychopathic Records, which would remain independently funded, produced, and recorded. Insane Clown Posse had their own studio built, called "The Lotus Pod". In the spring of 2001, Insane Clown Posse's road manager William Dail was arrested in Omaha, Nebraska, for allegedly choking a man who waved an Eminem T-shirt in front of the band. Dail was charged for misdemeanor assault and battery. The charges were reduced to a $100 fine after he pleaded guilty to a lesser charge.

The second Gathering of the Juggalos was held from July 13–15 at the SeaGate Convention Centre in Toledo, Ohio. The event featured the same activities as the first Gathering of the Juggalos, as well as guests such as Bone Thugs-n-Harmony, Vanilla Ice, and Three 6 Mafia. On June 15, 2001, Bruce was arrested in Columbia, Missouri, for an outstanding warrant in St. Louis stemming from an incident in February 2001. That incident involved Insane Clown Posse allegedly attacking employees of a St. Louis radio station over disparaging remarks that a disc jockey made on the air. The police used several squad cars to detain Bruce, Utsler, and two associates a few miles from a venue where the group had completed a concert. Bruce was transferred to St. Louis the following day and released on bail without charge on June 18.

==== 2002–2003: The Wraith: Shangri-La era ====
The face of the sixth Joker's Card is "The Wraith", a personification of Death. The card features two "exhibits", Shangri-La and Hell's Pit, each of which would be given its own album. On November 5, 2002, Insane Clown Posse released their eighth studio album, The Wraith: Shangri-La, which debuted at No. 15 on the Billboard 200 and No. 1 on the Top Independent Albums chart. The album was notable for its explicit acknowledgment of ICP's belief in God.

Ben Sisario criticized the album in the Rolling Stone Album Guide, writing that "the whole thing was some bland divine plan" and asking, "Is this man's final dis of God, or His of us?" Some critics perceived the spiritual element of the storyline to be a joke or stunt. Allmusic writer Bradley Torreano wrote that "Even if it is a joke, it isn't a funny one, or even a clever one." In September 2003, Insane Clown Posse was voted "the worst band of any musical genre" in Blender, with The Wraith: Shangri-La named as the group's worst album. However, the magazine also gave the album a positive review for its "charming, good-natured idiocy".

According to Bruce,

Some people might've been upset [by spiritual themes in The Wraith: Shangri-La], but through our eyes all we did was touch a lot of people. We definitely wanted it to be something everlasting. Maybe a 19-year-old might not understand or like that ending now. But later, when he has four kids, he might think, "That was the shit."

Following the release of The Wraith: Shangri-La, Bruce and Utsler signed a new contract with Sony BMG's RED Distribution and launched the Psychopathic Europe record label.

The duo went on the 75-date "Shangri-La World Tour", where they performed across the United States, Australia, and Europe. While in Australia, customs confiscated all the group's Faygo, assuming that they were bringing it for commercial purposes. Insane Clown Posse tried to explain that they are performers and that the soda was part of their act, but were still unable to use the Faygo and forced to use a different form of soda for their Australian tour.

==== 2004: The Wraith: Hell's Pit era ====
Following the release of The Wraith: Shangri-La, Bruce admitted that he was considering not completing the production of Hell's Pit. He is quoted as describing Shangri-La as "the end of the road. It's the end of the Joker's Cards. After this I could do anything I want, for the rest of my life. The positivity was so unbelievable". On August 31, 2004, Insane Clown Posse released their ninth studio album, Hell's Pit, the second exhibit of The Wraith, intended to warn listeners of the horrors of Hell. Bruce described the album as the darkest, most painful work he had ever done. Two versions of the album were released, each containing a different DVD. One release featured a live concert and a twelve-minute music video for the song "Real Underground Baby", and another featured a short film for the song "Bowling Balls", which was the first 3-D film shot in high-definition video. Also in 2004, music by Insane Clown Posse was featured in the film Demons at the Door, directed by Roy Knyrim.

==== 2005–2006: Post-First Deck era ====
In 2005, D12 and Insane Clown Posse ended their feud, with the help of member Proof. Attempts to officially end the feud between Eminem and Insane Clown Posse have been unsuccessful, but Bruce states that the rivalry has ended.

On February 1, 2006, Insane Clown Posse fan Jacob D. Robida attacked individuals in a gay bar in New Bedford, Massachusetts, with a handgun and a hatchet—a weapon featured in the logo of the group's record label, Psychopathic Records. Robida had a swastika tattoo and flaunted Nazi insignias and paraphernalia on his website. On February 5, Robida shot and killed a traffic officer during a routine stop. When police pulled Robida over during a later stop, he killed his girlfriend, Jennifer Bailey of Charleston, West Virginia, then opened fire on the police. Robida was shot twice in the head during the shootout with the police, and later died in the hospital. On February 7, Insane Clown Posse released a statement on the Robida attacks. The group's manager Alex Abbiss extended Bruce and Utsler's condolences and prayers to the families of the victims, stating that "It's quite obvious that this guy had no clue what being a Juggalo is all about. If anyone knows anything at all about ICP, then you know that they have never, ever been down or will be down with any racist or bigotry bullshit".

On October 21, 2006, Insane Clown Posse performed at one of twenty benefit shows organized by Myspace as part of the "Rock for Darfur" campaign to raise awareness of the War in Darfur and funds for the region's aid.

==== 2007–2008: The Tempest era ====
On March 20, 2007, Insane Clown Posse released their tenth studio album, The Tempest, which debuted at No. 20 on the Billboard 200 and sold nearly 33,000 copies in its first week. In 2008, Bruce and Utsler starred in the Knyrim-directed film Death Racers. It was released direct-to-video on September 16, 2008, by The Asylum. In December 2008, John Antonelli filed a lawsuit against the group after being struck by an unopened two-liter of Faygo during a performance at the Fargo nightclub The Hub, formerly known as Playmakers. Antonelli is seeking at least $50,000 in damages. The lawsuit also names the venue, Playmakers, as a defendant. An attorney for Playmakers states that only Bruce should be held liable.

==== Big Money Rustlas ====
Filming of Big Money Rustlas, a Western spoof, began in January 2009, and concluded on February 24, 2009. The tenth Gathering of the Juggalos took place at Hogrock in Cave-In-Rock, Illinois, from August 6 to 9. The event had the largest attendance in Gathering history with over 20,000 people. Over 120 musical artists performed at the event, including the likes of Tech N9ne, Kottonmouth Kings, Ice Cube, Gwar, Coolio, Vanilla Ice, Onyx, Scarface, The Dayton Family, Bizarre, Esham, and NATAS. At the event, the Big Money Rustlas trailer was screened twice. An infomercial for the event was released online by Psychopathic Records. After the event, a friend of Esham's handed Bruce a copy of his album I Ain't Cha Homey, which depicted a clown committing suicide with a gun on the front cover. Bruce listened to the album and saw it as a diss towards Insane Clown Posse. While Esham claimed that the album was not a diss in his podcast, the album strained the relationship between Bruce and Esham.

==== 2009–2011: Bang! Pow! Boom! era ====
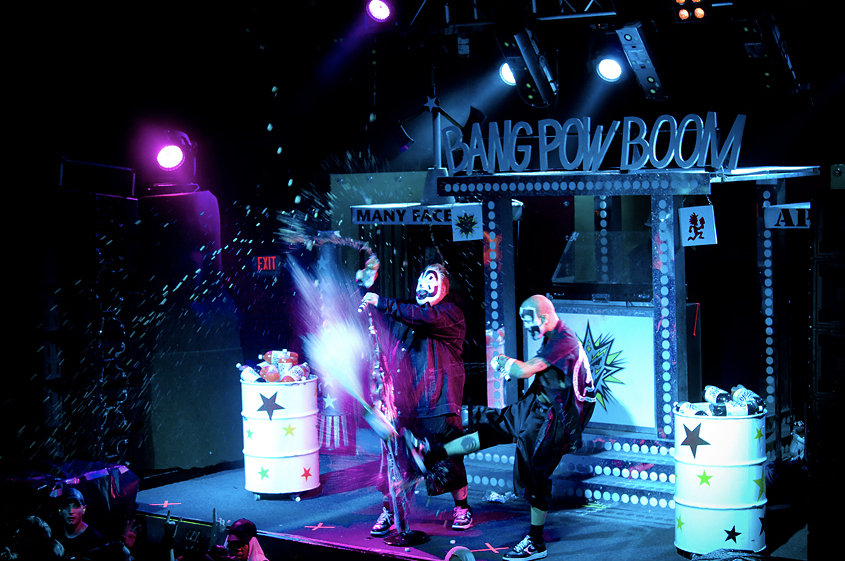
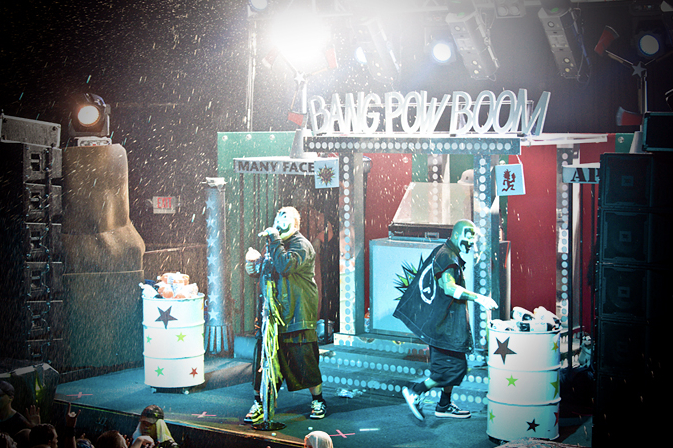
Insane Clown Posse in 2009

Insane Clown Posse's eleventh studio album, Bang! Pow! Boom!, was released on September 1, 2009. It debuted at No. 1 on the Billboard Top Independent Albums chart and No. 4 on the Billboard 200. The album was later revealed to be the first of a "second deck" of Joker's Cards. The Detroit News music critic Adam Graham gave the album a B rating, describing it as "the best material the Clowns have touched since 1999's The Amazing Jeckel Brothers".

On July 21, 2009, Tom Scharpling and Paul F. Tompkins discussed the 2009 Gathering of the Juggalos infomercial at length on The Best Show on WFMU. On December 5, 2009, Saturday Night Live aired a sketch titled "Kickspit Underground Rock Festival", which parodied the Gathering of the Juggalos infomercial. Bruce stated that he was not offended by the parody, and that he thought that the sketch was "hilarious" and "a humongous compliment". On February 17, 2010, Psychopathic Records signed a contract with Universal Music Group's Fontana Distribution. On March 9, 2010, Insane Clown Posse were interviewed by Nightline journalist Martin Bashir. Bruce hated the segment, stating that Bashir took statements made by the duo out of context, pairing one of Bruce's responses with a different question than he had been asked.

The trailer for Big Money Rustlas spawned a parody video called "Juggalo News", which achieved popularity on CollegeHumor and Funny or Die, and was praised by Bruce on his Twitter account. On April 6, 2010, Bang! Pow! Boom! was reissued in a "Nuclear Edition", which featured previously unreleased material and music videos for the songs "In Yo Face" and "Miracles". During this period, the duo won the Detroit Music Award for Outstanding Hip-Hop Artist/Group. On April 17, Saturday Night Live aired a sketch which parodied the "Miracles" music video, featuring host Ryan Phillippe and cast member Bobby Moynihan. Insane Clown Posse responded favorably to the parody, and asked to appear on the show.

Before the 12th annual Gathering of the Juggalos, Insane Clown Posse were contacted by Jack White, who invited Bruce and Utsler to his mansion because he wanted to collaborate with them. White played the track he was working on, an arrangement of Wolfgang Amadeus Mozart's "Leck mich im Arsch" with live instrumentation by JEFF the Brotherhood, for Bruce and Utsler and explained that the title of the track translated to "Lick My Ass". Bruce perceived that the scatological nature of the composition was the reason why White asked Bruce and Utsler to appear on the song, but once White explained Mozart's sense of humor, they became excited to work with White, went back to their hotel room to write their lyrics, and returned to record with White and JEFF the Brotherhood in White's home recording studio. Bruce and Utsler's vocals were recorded in one take. The song was released as a single on September 13 by White's label Third Man Records, paired with another song, "Mountain Girl", which Bruce describes as his favorite of the two songs recorded with White, and "more ICP's feel".

Big Money Rustlas was released on August 17, 2010. Insane Clown Posse returned to Europe for a tour. The group released a three-disc compilation of their guest appearances with other artists called Featuring Freshness in November 2011. The compilation also included new songs with artists Paris, Cold 187um, and Tone Tone.

At the 2011 Detroit Music Awards, Insane Clown Posse received the Distinguished Achievement Award. In June, Insane Clown Posse issued a cease and desist notice to the Upright Citizens Brigade, threatening legal action over a planned performance, "The Gathering of the Juggalos For A Mother Fucking Baby Funeral".

==== 2012–2014: The Mighty Death Pop! era and appearance on 1000 Ways to Die ====
At their 2010 Hallowicked concert, Insane Clown Posse announced that the second new Joker's Card would be The Mighty Death Pop! The album has two faces, the first of which was revealed at the Hallowicked concert. The Mighty Death Pop! features appearances from Tech N9ne and Hopsin.

Additionally, the album was released in three variant editions, containing three individual full-length bonus albums. The first variant edition, dubbed the Red Pop edition, contains an album of cover songs entitled Smothered, Covered & Chunked, which features appearances by Psychopathic artists Twiztid, Anybody Killa, Blaze Ya Dead Homie, Cold 187um and Boondox, as well as Limp Bizkit frontman Fred Durst and rapper Lil Wyte. The second variant, the Black Pop edition, contains the album Freaky Tales, consisting of a single, album-length rap, inspired by Too Short's song of the same name. In October 2012, the group made an appearance on the Spike television series, 1000 Ways to Die, as the horror rock band, Infernal Clown Posse (Episode: Deadliest Kitch). The third variant, the White Pop edition, contains the remix album Mike E. Clark's Extra Pop Emporium, which features remixes, outtakes and leftover songs recorded during the Mighty Death Pop sessions; these tracks include appearances by Kottonmouth Kings, Three 6 Mafia, Color Me Badd, Ice Cube, Scarface, Geto Boys, Twiztid, Kreayshawn, Swollen Members and Willie D. ICP said in their December 21, 2012 Hatchet Herald edition that they would be releasing a sideshow EP for The Mighty Death Pop! in 2013. The EP, titled House of Wax, was released on November 25, 2014, packaged inside The First Six.

==== 2013–2014: Continued legal troubles ====
Insane Clown Posse sued the FBI, whose National Gang Intelligence Center listed Juggalos as "a loosely organized hybrid gang" in a 2011 report. The report states that Juggalos are "recognized as a gang in only four states... law enforcement officials in at least 21 states have identified criminal Juggalo sub-sets". The report also noted that New Mexico was seeing a lot of Juggalo gang expansion due to their attraction to "the tribal and cultural traditions of the Native Americans". The lawsuit asks for the documents that the FBI used to reach this conclusion; in August 2013, federal authorities had "filed a motion to dismiss the case, saying they had already released several news media reports about Juggalos involved in criminal activity". The American Civil Liberties Union of Michigan is working with ICP's lawyers in order "to ensure the right of Juggalos everywhere to gather together and express their support of the I.C.P. without having to worry about being unfairly targeted and harassed by law enforcement". On January 8, 2014, Insane Clown Posse, along with the American Civil Liberties Union of Michigan, filed suit again against the FBI. The suit aims to have Juggalos no longer considered to be a gang and to have any "criminal intelligence information" about Juggalos destroyed. ICP announced in the edition of December 21, 2012, of the Hatchet Herald that they will be releasing a sideshow EP to The Mighty Death Pop! in 2013. After no word was heard on the album, it was speculated that it had been scrapped. In mid 2013 it was announced that ICP would be releasing their first ever box set titled The First Six. After the release date came and passed, The First Six was not released. In a February 2014 interview with Faygoluvers, the question was asked if we would be able to get the box set. ICP thought it had already been released. Dog Beats (the first ever release on Psychopathic Records) was set to be the bonus album in the box set, ICP went back and decided to put House of Wax in the box set instead. The First Six was set to be released on October 28, 2014. After a minor setback, was ultimately released on November 25, 2014.

Additionally, Psychopathic Records is pushing back against a former publicist who is suing the label for sexual harassment. In late 2013 ICP teamed up with Da Mafia 6ix to create The Killjoy Club, and released their debut album Reindeer Games on September 2, 2014. ICP went on "The ShockFest Tour" with Da Mafia 6ix, Mushroomhead, Madchild and Jelly Roll, additionally Big Hoodoo joined the tour to perform before the ticketed acts. To close out the shows on the tour Insane Clown Posse and Da Mafia 6ix performed on stage together as The Killjoy Club, doing only two songs.

==== 2015–2017: The Marvelous Missing Link era ====
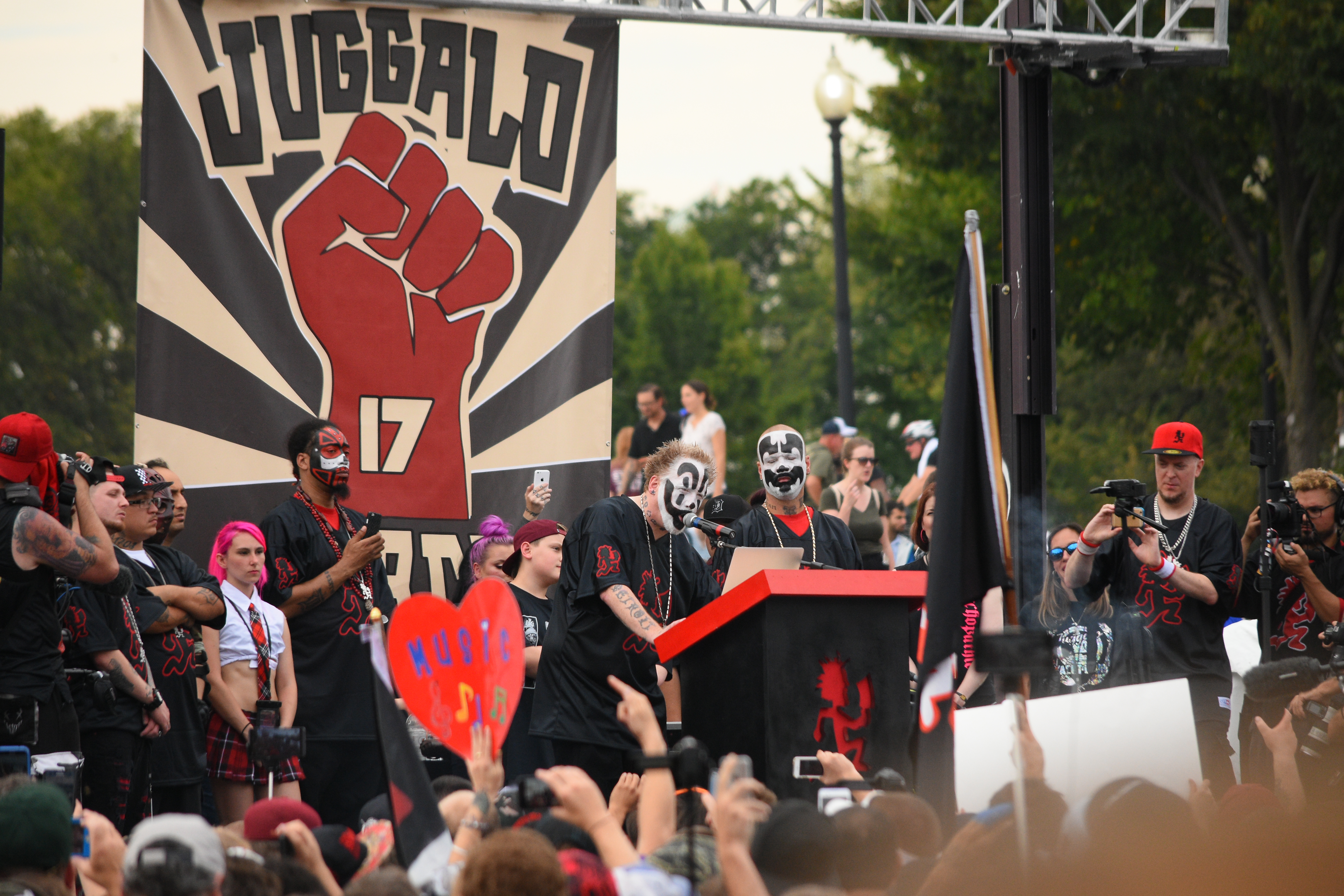
Insane Clown Posse giving a speech in 2017

During their 2014 Hallowicked concert, ICP revealed the 3rd Joker Card in the 2nd Deck of the Dark Carnival saga. The first part of the third card is titled The Marvelous Missing Link: Lost, which was released on Violent J's 43rd birthday, April 28, 2015. The second part of the third card is titled The Marvelous Missing Link: Found, and was originally set to be released during the 2015 Gathering of the Juggalos, July 28, 2015. It was released three days later.

On December 5, 2015, Violent J announced that original member John Kickjazz (Shaggy 2 Dope's older brother) had died on November 20, 2015, at a group home in Michigan.

Young Wicked of the Axe Murder Boyz posted on his personal Instagram account that The Marvelous Missing Link was one of the Insane Clown Posse's best albums ever. He stated specifically that it was going back to the Insane Clown Posse's roots in the era of the first deck of Jokers Cards. Young Wicked also made a statement that referenced the idea that he may have some featured spots on one of the albums.

On April 7, 2015, The Marvelous Missing Link: Lost was made available for digital download preorder. Those who preordered on that day received the first single off the album, titled "Vomit". The rest of the album automatically downloaded on the release date, April 28, 2015.

Michigan-based author Steve Miller wrote a book, Juggalo: Insane Clown Posse, Their Fans, and the World They Made; released in 2016 via Da Capo Press, the book details the fandom associated with juggalos and their struggle with the FBI.

In late 2015 2 flyers were released with the Phantom: X-tra Spooky Edition, promoting 2016 solo album releases from Violent J titled, Karma Forest, and Shaggy 2 Dope titled, F.T.F.O.M.F.. On December 10, 2015, it was announced that the sideshow EP for The Marvelous Missing Link albums was released titled Phantom: X-tra Spooky Edition.

In an April 8, 2016 faygoluvers.net interview with Violent J, he stated that Shaggy 2 Dope has been working with Young Wicked, who also produced the album, without asking Violent J for any help this far. After an internal conflict between Young Wicked, Violent J and Jumpsteady, it was rumoured that Young Wicked had left Psychopathic Records but was not made official until December 31, 2016, when it was announced that he had signed to Majik Ninja Entertainment.

In a January 19, 2017 ICP interview with Faygoluvers.net, Violent J stated that Shaggy 2 Dope and DJ Clay were working on the album. The album features Violent J on the song "Foggin' Up the Window" and DJ Clay on the bonus track (only available digitally) "Awww Shit". The album was released on May 26, 2017, and charted on the Billboard 200 at No. 72, Independent at No. 1, R&B/Hip-Hop at No. 39, Top Album Sales at No. 18 and Artist 100 at No. 96.

==== 2017–2019: Fearless Fred Fury era ====
On April 13, 2017, Violent J announced the development of the 4th Joker Card in the 2nd Deck was ongoing.

On September 16, 2017, an estimated 1,500 Juggalos gathered in front of the Lincoln Memorial to organize a concert and all-day rally in protest of their gang classification, and "class-based discrimination by law enforcement".

On June 22, 2018, ICP began posting live updates during the recording sessions for their album, which was to be named Fearless Fred Fury. It was originally announced for release on October 26, 2018, slated to release alongside a companion EP titled Flip The Rat. However, the release date was pushed back to February 15, 2019, which was eventually honored as the release of both Fearless Fred Fury and Flip The Rat.

==== 2020–2023: Yum Yum Bedlam era ====
On October 5, 2020, during ICP's House Party Peep Show live stream, the 5th Joker Card, entitled Yum Yum Bedlam was revealed, with a Christmas 2020 release date. During the live steam, the existence of three companion EPs was also confirmed for the album release cycle. After missing their original release date, an additional EP, Yum Yum's Lure, was released preceding the album on February 17, 2021. The album released on Halloween, 2021. The album's three companion EPs, entitled Wicked Vic the Weed, Pug Ugly the Stink Bud, and Woh the Weepin Weirdo, were all released in 2022.

==== 2024–present: The Naught era ====
On April 24, 2024, Violent J revealed that previous long-time collaborator Mike E. Clark would be returning to produce the 6th Joker's Card of the 2nd Deck. On July 25, 2025, they revealed the name of the album, The Naught, which would be released on August 12, 2025. Clark produced 5 of the 17 tracks on the album.

Insane Clown Posse will tour in 2026.

== Artistry ==
=== Musical style and influences ===
Insane Clown Posse's music is typically classified as hip-hop, horrorcore, or rap rock. The duo has incorporated elements of pop music, industrial rock and funk into its sound, as well as "carnival organ riffs, power chords and shotgun blasts...banjolike plucking and Van Halen-esque guitar squeals". Bruce and Utsler's vocal style has been described as alternating between rapping and screaming. In his review of The Tempest, Allmusic's David Jeffries writes that Bruce and Utsler "[rap] in a carnival barker fashion that fits with their circus motif, their Insane Clown disguises, and Mike E. Clark's big top-inspired production." The group's early work features a raw, minimalistic sound, which later evolved into a more rock-oriented style. Bruce has classified the group's music as "Wicked Pop". Bruce has also stated "We do our own genre of music".

Insane Clown Posse has covered songs by Geto Boys, Sly Fox, and Above the Law. Bruce and Utsler were influenced by Ice Cube, Awesome Dre, Geto Boys, Esham, Gong, and Michael Jackson, who Bruce called Insane Clown Posse's biggest influence. The duo has described Insane Clown Posse musically as a cross between N.W.A, Michael Jackson and Pearl Jam. Utsler has a tattoo of Jackson, and Bruce has a poster of Jackson facing him in his recording studio when he raps. Insane Clown Posse influenced Axe Murder Boyz, Blaze Ya Dead Homie and Boondox.

=== Lyrical themes ===
Insane Clown Posse's lyrics utilize "shocking (and blatantly over-the-top) narratives to give an over-exaggerated, almost cartoon-like version of urban deprivation in Detroit", according to author Sara Cohen. Bruce and Utsler describe many of their lyrics as being tongue-in-cheek. The group's lyrics serve as morality tales, with songs focusing on subjects such as cannibalism, murder and necrophilia. Insane Clown Posse's debut album, Carnival of Carnage, features a politically oriented focus, criticizing elitism and prejudice against those who live in the ghetto, while the album's liner notes criticize the Gulf War. The group's lyrics have opposed racism, bigotry, domestic violence, and child abuse.

=== Live performances ===
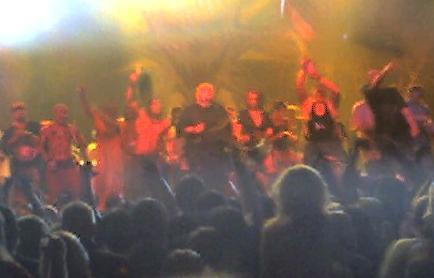
Insane Clown Posse often brings the entire lineup out to end its elaborate live performances.

Insane Clown Posse is known for their elaborate concert performances. In Marley Brant's Tales from the Rock 'n' Roll Highway, Bruce described a typical performance:

We toss out, kick out, and shoot out into the crowd about three to four hundred two-liters of Faygo at every show... We bring with us monsters, dancing clowns, girls, trampolines, and pure and absolute madness to the stage... Shaggy and I know that without all that crazy shit going on around us, we'd just be two more idiots walking back and forth, rapping on stage... ICP's motto has always been "Fuck keepin' it real: we just keep it entertaining."

Performances feature backdrops including, among other settings, a game show set and a cemetery. Bruce stated, "We always have a different set, not only for Hallowicked but every tour we go out on. We've been around so long that we get to dig up the many cool sets that we used back in the day and then get to use them again on a national level. Something we might've done once in '94 at St. Andrew's Hall, we can go back again and now do it nationwide-style".

On tour following the release of Dog Beats, Insane Clown Posse was scheduled to perform at Ferris State University in Big Rapids, Michigan, but were delayed by a blizzard. After they arrived, the group was announced by their manager, Alex Abbiss. Bruce remembers that "[w]e came out with no microphones or nothing; we were just right up in the people's faces. Shaggy and I were just fuckin' yelling over our own cassette. The people were staring at us in amazement and bewilderment. They must have been in shock and awe. We finished our two-song set, and the crowd...didn't cheer or boo. They just stood there, stunned"; they later learned that the concert was supposed to occur earlier in the evening, and that they were performing in the wrong building.

The group was unable to bring the large amounts of Faygo needed for their concerts to their European tours without a sales permit visa because customs believed that the group had intended to sell the soda at their concerts. As a result, the group's European record label purchased similar quantities of another soda and created fake Faygo stickers to label the bottles. According to Bruce, "The craziness was this: they were not the regular two-liter bottles we're used to; they were some other amount ... maybe one-and-a-half-liter bottles. Over there, they make their plastic bottles taller and thinner...when you're doing what we do with them—that makes a world of difference". During a performance in England, Bruce recounts that he "rocketed one of them bottles off my foot and that motherfucker shot straight up and out like a guided Patriot missile, right towards the disco ball high above the crowd...The bottle nailed the disco ball, and ... came falling down ... on top of some English kid's head. ... We must've knocked fifteen or twenty people flat-out cold on that tour...Shaggy and I both had black eyes and several injuries and bruises ourselves from them things hittin' us".

Bruce and Utsler did not expect many of their fans to attend Woodstock 1999, and were surprised when thousands of people chanted "I-C-P! I-C-P!" as they waited for the group to perform. Bruce told his stage crew that he would pay $2,000 to each person who ran around the stage naked, and two people took up his offer. Insane Clown Posse also brought naked women on stage. Bruce and Utsler felt that because the tickets to the event were over-priced, they needed to "give something back." According to Bruce, "We brought along these big beach balls. We announced to the crowd that they each had a hundred dollars taped to them, and then we proceeded to kick about thirty of them into the crowd. Then we rolled out these bigger giant-ass beach balls and announced, 'These ones have five hundred bucks taped to them!' We booted a gang of them into the human sea." Bruce also recounts that their set had multiple technical problems, and the audience was not allowed to get close to the stage, which made the duo feel less connected with them.

The group's 2009 tour in support of Bang! Pow! Boom! featured clowns, showgirls, a ringmaster and caged "attractions", including "Ape Boy". According to Bruce, "This is actually the biggest tour we've ever brought out, as far as stage theatrics and extras on stage...We've got a whole circus. We're touring clubs and theaters, but it's more like an arena show. It's like an arena concert packed into a club".

=== Spirituality ===
The themes of God's presence and the final judgment of individuals are explored in multiple Insane Clown Posse songs. Throughout their career, the group has used parables set within the Dark Carnival mythology to warn of the ultimate consequences of immoral behavior. Their 2002 album The Wraith: Shangri-La ended the first set of Joker Card albums and included the song The Unveiling, which explicitly revealed that the hidden message of ICP's music had always been to follow God. Joseph Bruce remarked that "The ending of the Joker Cards, the way we looked at it, was death. Heaven and Hell. That's up to each and every juggalo [to decide]".

Several journalists have commented on the apparent conflict between the group's sexualized and often violent lyrics and their stated spiritual message. In a June 2010 interview with The Columbian's Alan Sculley, Bruce explained, "[Sex and violence is] the stuff that people are talking about on the streets...to get attention, you have to speak their language. You have to interest them, gain their trust, talk to them and show you're one of them. You're a person from the street and speak of your experiences. Then at the end you can tell them God has helped me out like this and it might transfer over instead of just come straight out and just speak straight out of religion".

In an October 2010 article for The Guardian, Jon Ronson characterized the Insane Clown Posse as "evangelical Christians" who have "only been pretending to be brutal and sadistic to trick their fans into believing in God". In an interview with ICP conducted for the article, two of Ronson's queries referred parenthetically to ICP's "Christian message" and to the members' identities as "[secret] Christians". Several papers, including The Washington Post, published summaries of Ronson's claims.

Eight days after publication of the Guardian article, Joseph Bruce tweeted "I think [it's] crazy how some press say we're a Christian band and act like we're all religious [...] I'm proud that we believe in God but I haven't been to church since I was like 10. I don't even know if [Utsler has] ever been to church!" Christianity Today writer Mark Moring also challenged Ronson's characterization, writing that "The guys in ICP haven't used the word 'Christian' or 'evangelical' [...] so let's not call them anything that they're not claiming for themselves".

In 2011, Insane Clown Posse appeared on Attack of the Show! and repudiated claims that they were a Christian band. Bruce explained that their Dark Carnival mythology "comes from the basic principle of right and wrong, you know. Evil and good. That's all. We're just trying to say that there's bad guys out there and that there's good guys out there [...] We were taught there's a heaven and a hell, but that's all we were taught. We weren't taught about the [Ten] Commandments [... or] what's in the Bible and all that. We just [...] want to see good people hopefully go to heaven, which we refer to as Shangri-La". Joseph Utsler explained in a 2002 interview with Craig Markley that "God is in your heart [...] In my definition, it doesn't matter what creed, religion, or group you belong to. If you're doing what's right and are a good person, then you're right with God." Bruce and Utsler have also stated that they are not certain that God and the afterlife exist, but that they would like to believe that there is something after death.

== Wrestling ==
Both Bruce and Utsler began wrestling as single competitors in 1983 in their backyard wrestling promotion Tag Team Wrestling, later renamed National All-Star Wrestling. The two moved on to compete in various independent promotions in Michigan from 1990 to 1997 before making an appearance together in Extreme Championship Wrestling (ECW) as Insane Clown Posse. In 1998, the team had a three-month stint in World Wrestling Federation (WWF, now WWE) where they wrestled alongside The Oddities and, later, The Headbangers.

After leaving the company, they went to wrestle for World Championship Wrestling (WCW) with The Dead Pool and The Dark Carnival between 1999 and 2000. On December 19, 1999, Bruce and Utsler created their own wrestling promotion, Juggalo Championshit Wrestling (now known as Juggalo Championship Wrestling). In 2004, they briefly wrestled in Total Nonstop Action Wrestling (TNA). The duo continues to wrestle today in Juggalo Championship Wrestling as well as in various independent promotions.

Insane Clown Posse gained fame for being both professional musicians and professional wrestlers. Overall, they are two-time JCW Tag Team Champions. Additionally, Bruce is a one-time JCW Tag Team Champion with 2 Tuff Tony, and Utsler is a one-time JCW Heavyweight Champion. Bruce and Utsler are also founding members of the Juggalo World Order.

In addition they were largely involved in Backyard Wrestling: Don't Try This at Home, where most of the wrestlers in the game were members of JCW.

== Members ==
Current

- Violent J (Joe Bruce) – Vocals, lyrics, production (1989–present)
- Shaggy 2 Dope (Joe Utsler) – Vocals, lyrics, scratching (1989–present)

Former

- John Kickjazz (John Utsler) – Vocals (1989–1992) (died 2015)
- D-Lyrical (Dale Miettinen Jr) – Vocals, production (1989)
- Kid Villain (John Rode) – Skits, vocals (1991–1992) (died mid-2000s)
- Greez-E (Erik Olsen) – Vocals (1993)

== Discography ==
Studio albums

- Carnival of Carnage (1992)
- Ringmaster (1994)
- Riddle Box (1995)
- The Great Milenko (1997)
- The Amazing Jeckel Brothers (1999)
- Bizaar (2000)
- Bizzar (2000)
- The Wraith: Shangri-La (2002)
- The Wraith: Hell's Pit (2004)
- The Tempest (2007)
- Bang! Pow! Boom! (2009)
- The Mighty Death Pop! (2012)
- The Marvelous Missing Link: Lost (2015)
- The Marvelous Missing Link: Found (2015)
- Fearless Fred Fury (2019)
- Yum Yum Bedlam (2021)
- The Naught (2025)

== Awards and nominations ==
=== Detroit Music Awards ===
Year	Result	Category	Nominated work
2010	Won	Outstanding Hip-Hop Artist/Group	Insane Clown Posse
2010	Nominated	Outstanding Video / Major Budget (Over $10,000)	"In Yo Face"
2011	Won	Distinguished Achievement Award	Insane Clown Posse
