= The Marvelous Missing Link: Lost =

Studio album by Insane Clown Posse
- Released: April 28, 2015
- Recorded: Mid-2014 – late 2014/early 2015
- Length: 53:47
- Label: Psychopathic
- Producers: Mike P.; Seven; Otis; Kuma

Insane Clown Posse chronology
The Mighty Death Pop! (2012)	The Marvelous Missing Link: Lost (2015)	The Marvelous Missing Link: Found (2015)

Singles from The Marvelous Missing Link: Lost
- 1. "Vomit" Released: April 7, 2015; 2. "Explosions" Released: May 14, 2015; 3. "Falling Apart" Released: March 9, 2016; 4. "I See the Devil" Released: April 22, 2016

The Marvelous Missing Link: Lost is the thirteenth studio album by Insane Clown Posse. It is the first part of the third Joker Card in the second Deck of the Dark Carnival Saga. It was released on April 28, 2015, on Psychopathic Records via Sony's RED Distribution, three months before the release of its companion album Found. It is the group's 34th overall release.

Professional ratings
Review scores
Source	Rating
AllMusic	2.5/5 stars

== Singles ==
The first single, titled "Vomit", was released on April 7, 2015. People who preordered the album digitally received the single free. The second single was "Explosions", and was accompanied by a music video on May 14, 2015.

The third single titled "Falling Apart" was released March 9, 2016 and was accompanied by a music video released worldwide via Billboard.com. On April 22, 2016 ICP released the fourth single "I See The Devil" and was accompanied by a music video.

== Music videos ==
On the April 28, 2015, press release for The Marvelous Missing Link: Lost, it was stated that the first music video will be shot sometime in the upcoming week. On a segment of Sugar Slam's "Rock It Or Sock It" show on April 30, 2015,on Psychopathic Radio, Psychopathic producer Kuma announced that they have shot a video for the song "Explosions" and will be released sometime later this month. The music video was released on May 14, 2015. It was also co-released on Vice.com, exclusively for only 24 hours, as reported in the May 9, 2015 edition of the Hatchet Herald.

On March 9, 2016 the second music video for "Falling Apart" debuted worldwide via Billboard.com. On April 22, 2016 the third music video was released for the song "I See The Devil".

== Commercial performance ==
The album debuted at number 17 on the Billboard 200, selling 18,000 copies in its first week. ICP won album of the week by vintagevinylnews.com, by being the highest ranking veteran artist.

== Release ==
The album was released on April 28, 2015. It peaked at #17 on the Billboard 200, number 2 on the Independent charts, and number 2 on the Rap charts. On June 16, 2015, with the posting of the 2015 Gathering program on juggalogathering.com, it was announced that both Lost and Found would be released on a 4 LP vinyl set on September 18, 2015. On October 2, 2015, the leftover songs from both albums were released as The Marvelous Missing Link: Outtakes.

== Track listing ==
No.	Title	Producer(s)	Length
1.	"Intro"	Axe Murder Boyz	2:00
2.	"Lost"	Mike P.	3:20
3.	"Apocalypse"	Seven	2:58
4.	"Shock"	Seven	2:32
5.	"Confederate Flag"	Mike P.	4:12
6.	"Vomit"	Mike P.	4:44
7.	"Falling Apart"	Axe Murder Boyz	4:30
8.	"How"	Mike P.	3:48
9.	"Explosions"	Seven	2:56
10.	"I'll Keep My Hatchet"	Axe Murder Boyz	3:12
11.	"Neighbors Are Fighting"	Axe Murder Boyz	3:01
12.	"You Should Know"	Brian Kuma	4:28
13.	"Flamethrower"	Axe Murder Boyz	5:29
14.	"I See the Devil"	Seven	6:37
Total length:			53:47

=== The Marvelous Missing Link: Outtakes ===
(songs in bold are left over from The Marvelous Missing Link: Lost)

No.	Title	Length
1.	"Lost Intro"	1:24
2.	"The Missing Link"	4:02
3.	"Six Pedophiles"	4:31
4.	"The Monster"	3:45
5.	"Why'd I Have to Die?"	5:08
6.	"Joey the Butcher"	3:10
7.	"The Dream"	5:20
8.	"Found Intro"	1:29
9.	"Let Loose"	3:13
10.	"Dead Heather"	3:06
11.	"The Carousel"	4:27
12.	"Hooker"	2:36
13.	"I'm Sorry"	3:37
14.	"Immortal"	4:28
Total length:		49:06

== Personnel ==
=== Vocals, lyrics ===
- Violent J - Vocals, lyrics
- Shaggy 2 Dope - Vocals, lyrics
- Otis/Young Wicked - Additional lyrics
- Big Hoodoo - Additional Background vocals
- Jumpsteady - Lyrics/vocals on "Intro", additional background vocals
- Sugar Slam - Additional background vocals
- Chop - Additional background vocals
- Mean Dean - Additional background vocals
- J-Webb - Additional background vocals
- Ominous The Klown - Additional background vocals

=== Production ===
- Otis/Young Wicked - Production (1,7,10,11,13)
- Mike P. - Production (2,5,6,8)
- Michael "Seven" Summers - Production (3,4,9,14)
- Brian Kuma - Production (12)

== Chart positions ==
Chart (2015)	Peak position
US Billboard 200	17
US US Indie	2
US US Rap	2
US Tastemakers	7
US Top Album Sales	7
