= Fearless Fred Fury =

Album by Insane Clown Posse

Studio album by Insane Clown Posse
- Released: February 15, 2019
- Recorded: 2017–18
- Studios: The Lotus Pod (Detroit); Rusty's Boom Room (Detroit)
- Genre: Horrorcore
- Length: 69:25
- Label: Psychopathic
- Producers: DJ Mysterioso; Kuma; Mike P.; Dr. Punch; Seven; Str8jaket

Insane Clown Posse chronology
The Marvelous Missing Link: Found (2015)	Fearless Fred Fury (2019)	Yum Yum Bedlam (2021)

Singles from Fearless Fred Fury
- 1. "WTF!" Released: November 23, 2018; 2. "Fury" Released: January 11, 2019; 3. "Satellite" Released: June 5, 2019; 4. "Nobody's Fault" Released: November 22, 2019

Professional ratings
Review scores
Source	Rating
AllMusic	2.5/5 stars

Fearless Fred Fury is the fifteenth studio album by American hip hop duo Insane Clown Posse, and their fourth Joker Card in the second Deck of the Dark Carnival Saga. Originally planned for release simultaneously with their twelve-track extended play titled Flip the Rat on October 26, 2018, via Psychopathic Records, it was delayed until February 15, 2019.

== Background ==
During the April 13, 2017 Juggalo Show radio show, Violent J announced that he had "received" the name, face and backstory for the new joker card via an "email in his brain". He went on to say "Before we go out on The Parental Advisory Tour with 2 Live Crew, Captain Chronic, Onyx and Necro which will run from June until the Gathering of the Juggalos, we will get the skeleton formed. After the GOTJ, Shaggy 2 Dope will go out on the F.T.F.O.M.F. Tour, and when he get back we will begin putting the nervous system, muscles, and skin to the new entity, and bring life to the beast. I won't speak much on it right now, but the only thing I will say is 'Red Fred! Red Fred!'". During the 24th Annual: Hallowicked Show in Detroit, Michigan, the name and face for the new Joker Card was revealed.

On June 22, 2018, ICP took to social media during the "Fearless Fred Fury recording sessions" to give live updates. Pictures were shown with ICP and Str8Jaket with their backs to the camera sitting at the computer working on certain songs. Some songs that were named were "WTF!", "Satellite", "Friend Request", "West Vernor Ave.", "Peek-A-Boo", "1967", and "Game Over". It was also said that "story telling songs like "First Day Out" and "Dreams of Grandeur" would be on the album, as FFF would feature more story telling songs on it than any previous ICP release to date". During ICP's 2018 GOTJ seminar it was announced that FFF would be released on October 26, 2018, plus a bonus album titled Flip the Rat EP would subsequently be released on the same day, with people who only purchase the physical copy could find out how to obtain the EP. Flip the Rat is said to be longer than a standard EP, but shorter than a standard LP, and is being dubbed as an "MP" for "Medium Playlist".

On January 28, 2019, the tracklist was revealed via video easter eggs containing the number for a phone to call revealing a website to visit.

== Singles ==
On November 23, 2018, the first single, "WTF!", was released. On January 7, 2019, it was announced that the track, "Fury", would be released as a single on January 11, 2019.

== Track listing ==
Fearless Fred Fury
No.	Title	Producer(s)	Length
1.	"Intro"	Str8jaket; Dr. Punch	1:54
2.	"Red Fred"	DJ Mysterioso; Dr. Punch; Str8jaket	2:31
3.	"Fury!"	Seven; Dr. Punch; Str8jaket	4:24
4.	"West Vernor Ave."	Mike P.; Str8jaket	3:40
5.	"WTF!"	Seven; Dr. Punch; Str8jaket	4:34
6.	"Satellite"	Seven; Dr. Punch; Str8jaket	3:54
7.	"Seriously Hilarious"	DJ Mysterioso; Dr. Punch; Str8jaket	3:50
8.	"Game Over"	Devereaux	5:02
9.	"Night of Red Rum"	Seven	3:56
10.	"Low"	Str8jaket	3:15
11.	"Triplex"	Mike P.	4:41
12.	"Nobody's Fault"	Seven	4:47
13.	"Hot Head"	Seven	5:02
14.	"Shimmer"	Brian Kuma	5:57
15.	"Freedom"	Brian Kuma	5:12
16.	"Beware!"	Dr. Punch	0:43
17.	"I Like It Rough"	Str8jaket	6:14
Total length:			1:09:25

Flip the Rat
No.	Title	Producer(s)	Length
1.	"Intro"	Dr. Punch	0:27
2.	"A Face 4 Fighting"	Str8jaket	3:14
3.	"Fite Back" (feat. Captain Chronic)	DJ Paul	3:38
4.	"Revenge"	Mike P.; Str8jaket; Dr. Punch	2:44
5.	"I'm That Type" (feat. Ouija Macc)	Seven	4:11
6.	"Hungry" (feat. Big Hoodoo)	Brian Kuma	4:05
7.	"Splish Splash"	Devereaux	3:52
8.	"Friend Request"	Violent J	4:11
9.	"I Could Never"	Devereaux	5:07
10.	"Hawking"	Seven	5:33
11.	"Tha Dogg"	Seven; Dr. Punch; Str8jaket	6:12
12.	"Be Safe"	Brian Kuma	6:27
Total length:			49:47

An Era of Fury
No.	Title	Length
1.	"Intro"	0:09
2.	"Head Bust Brothers"	4:12
3.	"Juggalo Love Psypher" (feat. Lyte, Big Hoodoo & Ouija Macc)	8:30
4.	"Hair Up"	3:41
5.	"I Can't"	4:34
6.	"7 Foot 8 Foot" (feat. Lyte)	4:19
7.	"Bloody" (cover of "Time Waits for No One" by The Jacksons)	3:17
8.	"Cuss Words" (feat. Ouija Macc)	6:17
9.	"Peek-A-Boo"	4:14
10.	"Steve Meets Abu"	4:50
11.	"8 Ways to Die Psypher" (Stitches, Esham, Mac Lethal, Ouija Mac, DJ Paul, Cage)	8:23
12.	"Mr. Clean"	4:16
13.	"Techniques and Tactics" (feat. Project Born)	4:08
14.	"Noided, Jelly & Heated"	5:19
15.	"Dunno"	2:58
16.	"Judgment Day 2018" (Esham cover)	3:45
17.	"Best Friends"	6:34
Total length:		79:00

== Samples ==
- "Red Fred" samples "Murderer" by Barrington Levy
- "Satellite" samples "Hustlin'" by Rick Ross
- "West Vernor Ave." interpolates "Electric Avenue" by Eddy Grant and samples "Scarface" by Geto Boys
- "The Dogg" samples "Man in the Box" by Alice in Chains

== Charts ==
Chart (2019)	Peak position
US Billboard 200	44
US Top R&B/Hip-Hop Albums (Billboard)	26
US Top Rap Albums (Billboard)	24
US Digital Albums (Billboard)	12
US Independent Albums (Billboard)	2
US Indie Store Album Sales (Billboard)	2
