= Yum Yum Bedlam =

Studio album by Insane Clown Posse
- Released: October 31, 2021
- Recorded: 2020
- Studios: The Lotus Pod (Detroit); Rusty's Boom Room (Detroit)
- Genres: Horrorcore; rap rock
- Length: 74:00
- Label: Psychopathic
- Producers: Devereaux; Brian Kuma; Mike P.; ShaggyTheAirhead; Mythic Mindz; Str8jaket

Insane Clown Posse chronology
Fearless Fred Fury (2019)	Yum Yum Bedlam (2021)	The Naught (2025)

Singles from Yum Yum Bedlam
- 1. "Wretched" Released: October 21, 2021; 2. "Clown Drippin'" Released: December 17, 2021; 3. "Ain't No Time" Released: January 14, 2022; 4. "Queens" Released: June 6, 2022

Yum Yum Bedlam is the sixteenth studio album by American hip hop duo Insane Clown Posse (ICP), and their fifth Joker Card in the Second Deck of the Dark Carnival Saga. It was released on October 31, 2021, on Psychopathic Records.

== Background ==
On October 5, 2020, during ICP's House Party Peep Show live stream, Violent J, Shaggy 2 Dope, and Jumpsteady held a seminar revealing the name of the upcoming album. They also played the preview of the first single of the album "Ding Ding Doll". The album was followed up by three extended play albums that have either six or seven even songs each.

It was also announced after all three EPs had been released that the band would release a full album of the EPs combined, called The Seeds of Yum Yum. The first EP Yum Yum's Lure was released on Juggalo Day, February 17, 2021. Plans changed, and "Ding Ding Doll" did not end up on the album, instead appearing only on the aforementioned EP Yum Yum's Lure. The full-length album Yum Yum Bedlam was instead released with all-new material on October 31, 2021. The album's booklet mentioned three additional EPs that would be released in 2022 (Wicked Vic the Weed, Pug Ugly the Stink Bud, and Woh the Weeping Weirdo).

Track 17, Something To See, uses the melody from the song "Something About You" by the band Level 42.

== Reception ==
"Yum Yum Bedlam is ICP's new set, the latest in its series of Joker's Card releases, and the first to be centered on a female character. The album's themes revolve around temptation, seduction, faith, betrayal and living without regret, and Bruce says it's a very personal album that was at least partially inspired by his relationship with his ex-girlfriend.", wrote The Detroit News.

== Track listing ==
Yum Yum Bedlam track listing
No.	Title	Producer(s)	Length
1.	"Intro" (featuring Laney Chantel)	Devereaux	2:14
2.	"Here Comes the Carnival"	Brian Kuma	4:33
3.	"Wretched"	Devereaux	3:20
4.	"Clown Drippin'"	Shaggytheairhead	3:43
5.	"Gangsta Code"	Mike P.	4:41
6.	"Queens"	Mythic Mindz	3:53
7.	"Panic Attack!!!"	Mike P.	7:07
8.	"Fuck Regret"	Shaggytheairhead	3:53
9.	"Insomnia"	Shaggytheairhead	6:18
10.	"Heart & Soul" (featuring Vinnie Dombroski)	Mike P.	3:59
11.	"The Drunk & the Addict"	Mythic Mindz	4:23
12.	"Don't Touch That Flower"	Str8jaket	4:11
13.	"Slapnut/The Jokstas (Note: On digital outlets and websites the song is named "Slapnut" but on the booklet and CD it is named "The Jokstas".)"	Brian Kuma	3:38
14.	"Bitch I'm Fine"	Shaggytheairhead	3:43
15.	"Carnival of Lights"	Str8jaket	4:10
16.	"Ain't No Time" (featuring Roadside Ghost)	Devereaux	5:35
17.	"Something to See"	Mike P.	4:41
Total length:			74:00

== Charts ==
Chart performance for Yum Yum Bedlam
Chart (2022)	Peak position
US Top Current Album Sales (Billboard)	33
