= Lower class =

Lower class may refer to:

- Lower social class, those at or near the bottom of the socio-economic hierarchy; also known as the underclass, and may include many of those at the bottom of the working class
  - American lower class, more specifically, the lower class in the United States
  - Lower middle class, a sub-division of the middle class, just above the lower class
- Working class, those employed in blue collar, pink collar, and manual jobs
- Proletariat, the class of wage-earners in a capitalist society whose main material value is their labour-power; encompasses the working class and the underclass

== See also ==
- Social class, social stratification of people into a set of hierarchical social categories
- Commoner, people in a feudal system who are members of neither the nobility nor the priesthood
- Underclass, those at lowest possible position in a class hierarchy, below the working class; also called the lower-lower-class
