= The Amazing Jeckel Brothers =

- Jack Jeckel edition

Studio album by Insane Clown Posse
- Released: May 25, 1999
- Recorded: 1998–99
- Genres: Hip-hop; horrorcore; rap rock
- Length: 69:30
- Labels: Island; Psychopathic 524 661 (Jack) 524 659 (Jake)
- Producers: Mike E. Clark; Insane Clown Posse

Insane Clown Posse chronology
The Great Milenko (1997)	The Amazing Jeckel Brothers (1999)	Bizaar (2000)

Alternative cover
- Jake Jeckel edition

The Amazing Jeckel Brothers is the fifth studio album by American hip-hop group Insane Clown Posse, released on May 25, 1999, by Island Records, in association with Psychopathic Records. Recording sessions for the album took place from 1998 to 1999. The album is the fifth Joker's Card in the group's Dark Carnival mythology. The album's lyrics focus on the nine circles of hell and the morality of man as he is torn between righteousness and evil. The album's titular Jeckel Brothers are spirits who juggle balls of fire, representing the sins committed during the mortal life of the dead.

The Amazing Jeckel Brothers was the second studio album Insane Clown Posse released by Island. The Amazing Jeckel Brothers features guest appearances by rappers Ol' Dirty Bastard and Snoop Dogg, and additional contributions by The Jerky Boys and Twiztid. It debuted at number four on the Billboard charts and was later certified platinum by the Recording Industry Association of America (RIAA).

== Background ==
After a tumultuous contract with Jive Records sub-label Battery in 1995, Insane Clown Posse (ICP) attempted to find a new record label. Manager Alex Abbiss negotiated a contract with the Walt Disney Company-owned label Hollywood Records, which reportedly paid US$1 million to purchase the Insane Clown Posse contract from Battery/Jive Records.

After recording and releasing The Great Milenko, Insane Clown Posse was notified that Hollywood Records had deleted the album within hours of its release, despite having sold 18,000 copies and reaching #63 on the Billboard 200. It was later revealed that Disney was being criticized by the Southern Baptist Church. The church claimed Disney was turning its back on family values.

In due time, labels such as Interscope Records wanted to sign the group, but Island Records' Chris Blackwell came to the group's rescue and agreed to release The Great Milenko as it was originally intended. Thanks to the controversy, and additional promotion by Island, over one million copies of The Great Milenko had been sold by 1998, and Insane Clown Posse was ready for the fifth Joker's Card, The Amazing Jeckel Brothers.

== Recording and production ==
Working with Mike E. Clark and Rich "Legz Diamond" Murrell, Joseph Bruce and Joseph Utsler developed their album with the highest of hopes. Hoping to receive the respect Bruce and Utsler felt they deserved, they planned to feature well-known, respected rappers on their album. Bruce stated outright that he wanted to involve Snoop Dogg, Ol' Dirty Bastard, and Ice-T. Snoop Dogg requested that Insane Clown Posse not pay his then-current record label, No Limit Records; further, Snoop said that he would appear on the album if Bruce and Utsler gave him "$40,000 in a briefcase". Insane Clown Posse agreed, and Snoop Dogg appeared on the song "The Shaggy Show", which also featured the ska band Gangster Fun playing music before each of the song's faux commercial breaks. Insane Clown Posse also unsuccessfully attempted to contact Ice Cube to collaborate with them.

Snoop Dogg also helped them contact Ol' Dirty Bastard, who was paid $30,000 for his appearance. Ol' Dirty Bastard recorded his track in a matter of two days; however, his recording consisted of nothing more than him rambling about "bitches." It took Bruce and Utsler a week to assemble just four rhymes out of his rambling, using Pro Tools because his raps were out of synch with Clark's beat. The duo eventually had to re-record their lines and re-title the song "Bitches". The group also recorded a song titled "Dead End" with Ice-T, who charged them $10,000 for his appearance. However, the group eventually felt that Ice-T's song did not belong on the album, and they decided to instead released it on the compilation, Psychopathics from Outer Space (2000). The song "Echo Side" was originally released at an Insane Clown Posse concert in Garden City, Michigan as the first ever single from Dark Lotus.

To help increase their positive publicity, Island Records hired the Nasty Little Man publicity team. The team set up a photo shoot for Insane Clown Posse that was to appear on the cover of Alternative Press magazine. On the set of the photo shoot, a member of the publicity team approached Bruce and explained that in the song "Fuck the World", the lyric that stated "Fuck the Beastie Boys and the Dalai Lama" needed to be changed. Insulted, Bruce exclaimed that his music would not be censored again – referring to Disney's previous requirement of censure. Nasty Little Man told Bruce that the Beastie Boys were not only clients of the company but also personal friends, and the Beastie Boys had tasked the company with getting the lyrics changed. In response, Bruce fired Nasty Little Man in response to the request and demanded that they leave the photo shoot.

== Musical style ==
"Jake Jeckel" (sample)
"Jake Jeckel", from the group's 1999 album The Amazing Jeckel Brothers.

The Amazing Jeckel Brothers has been described as hip-hop, horrorcore, and rap rock. Stephen Thomas Erlewine of AllMusic wrote, "Where The Great Milenko [...] was targeted at white-boy, adolescent metalheads [...] The Amazing Jeckel Brothers contains cameos from Snoop Dogg and Ol' Dirty Bastard, plus a cover of a Geto Boys song, which brings [Insane Clown Posse] to street level."

To produce the album, Insane Clown Posse once again teamed up with renowned Detroit record producer and DJ Mike E. Clark, who utilized standard hip-hop techniques such as record scratching and samples ranging from 1970s funk to calliope music. "Another Love Song" was based upon Beck's song "Jack-Ass", which itself was derived from a sample of Bob Dylan's "It's All Over Now, Baby Blue". Bruce loved the song and wanted to rewrite it in his own style. Although the group "lifted the riff from Beck", since Beck's song sampled the Dylan composition, Insane Clown Posse's sample was cleared with Dylan rather than Beck. Rolling Stone writer Barry Walters wrote that Clark's production incorporates elements of "carnival organ riffs, power chords and shotgun blasts ... banjolike plucking and Van Halen-esque guitar squeals."

== Lyrical themes ==
Emerging from the Dark Carnival like phantom smoke drifting into the minds of men, they are the Amazing Jeckel Brothers. A chaotic duo of juggling masters, Jack "the sinister" and Jake "the just" juggle the sins of mortal men... There is no escape from their juggling act because there is no way to escape ourselves. Only in death will we recognize this as we twist and spin to the other side.

— Liner notes

Between the releases of The Great Milenko and The Amazing Jeckel Brothers, the Insane Clown Posse achieved national notoriety, though they struggled to be taken seriously. While the controversy surrounding Milenko secured them a deal with Island Records, it also invited a wave of public criticism regarding their style and lyrics. Joseph Bruce recalls this as an "angry era" for the duo, fueled by relentless negativity. He noted that the group kept two piles of press clippings at their office: "One pile was all the positive press [we've] gotten, which was under an inch tall. Then [we] had the negative press pile, which was spilling over the side of a full basket." Consequently, The Amazing Jeckel Brothers was conceived as an outlet for that accumulated frustration.

Lyrically, The Amazing Jeckel Brothers focuses on the 9 circles of hell, and the morality of man as he is torn between righteousness and evil. In the canon of the band's "Dark Carnival" mythology, the titular brothers—Jack "the sinister" and Jake "the just"—emerge from the flame of a candle to determine the fate of the dead. The Jeckel Brothers juggle fire balls, and when judging a soul, they add a ball for every sin that that individual committed during their mortal life. Jack attempts to disrupt Jake and cause him drop a ball. If a soul witnesses a ball drop, they are damned to hell, but if they see Jake successfully complete the act, they will ascend to heaven.

== Release and reception ==
Professional ratings
Review scores
Source	Rating
AllMusic	4/5 stars
The Encyclopedia of Popular Music	3/5 stars
NME	3/10
PopMatters	3/10
Rolling Stone	2/5 stars
Martin Charles Strong	4/10
The Village Voice	C+

The Amazing Jeckel Brothers debuted and peaked at #4 on the Billboard 200. In order to promote the album, Island released multiple collectible versions of The Amazing Jeckel Brothers, emphasizing the faces of Jake or Jack Jeckel. In 2008, it achieved platinum certification.

The album received mostly negative reviews from critics. NME wrote that "the slick, dumbed-down Dungeons & Dragons rap-rock schtick [...] is often unbearable". College Music Journal writer Matt Ashare described the album as "Cirque de so-lame". Rolling Stone writer Barry Walters gave the album two out of five stars, writing that "no musical sleight of hand can disguise the fact that Shaggy and J remain the ultimate wack MCs." In The Great Rock Discography, Martin Charles Strong gave the album four out of ten stars.

PopMatters reviewer Brendan Maher accused Insane Clown Posse of misogyny and described The Amazing Jeckel Brothers as "music to strangle your ex-girlfriend to". Robert Christgau gave the album a C+, writing "Though they claim clown, they rarely get funnier than 'I'd cut my head off but then I would be dead'." However, Stephen Thomas Erlewine of AllMusic gave the album a four out of five star rating, writing that "[Insane Clown Posse] actually delivered an album that comes close to fulfilling whatever promise their ridiculous, carnivalesque blend of hardcore hip hop and shock-metal had in the first place".

== Track listing ==
All songs are written by Mike E. Clark and ICP, unless otherwise noted.

No.	Title	Writer(s)	Length
1.	"Intro"		1:19
2.	"Jake Jeckel"		1:26
3.	"Bring It On"		4:28
4.	"I Want My Shit"		5:20
5.	"Bitches" (featuring Ol' Dirty Bastard and The Jerky Boys)	ICP; Ol' Dirty Bastard	4:33
6.	"Terrible"		4:21
7.	"I Stab People"		1:40
8.	"Another Love Song"		4:09
9.	"Everybody Rize"		3:21
10.	"Play with Me"		4:19
11.	"Jack Jeckel"		1:25
12.	"Fuck the World"		3:44
13.	"The Shaggy Show" (featuring Snoop Dogg)	ICP; Mike E. Clark; Snoop Dogg; Gangster Fun	6:32
14.	"Mad Professor"		5:49
15.	"Assassins" (featuring The Jerky Boys) (Geto Boys cover)	Geto Boys; ICP	5:15
16.	"Echo Side" (featuring Twiztid)	Mike E. Clark; ICP; Twiztid	5:39
17.	"Nothing's Left"		6:10
Total length:			69:30

== Personnel ==
Band members and production

- Violent J – vocals, lyrics
- Shaggy 2 Dope – vocals, lyrics
- Mike E. Clark – production, programmer, engineer
- Rich "Legz Diamond" Murrell – guitar, vocals

Other personnel

- Snoop Dogg – featured on "The Shaggy Show"
- Ol' Dirty Bastard – featured on "Bitches"
- The Jerky Boys – featured on "Bitches" and "Assassins"
- Twiztid – featured on "Echo Side"
- Gangster Fun – featured on "The Shaggy Show"

"Another Love Song" uses the melody from "Jack-Ass" by Beck.

== Charts and certifications ==
=== Weekly charts ===
Chart (1999)	Peak position
US Billboard 200	4

=== Year-end charts ===
Chart (1999)	Position
US Billboard 200	166

=== Certifications ===
Region	Certification	Certified units/sales
United States (RIAA)	Platinum	1,000,000^{^}
^{^} Shipments figures based on certification alone.

== Notes ==
- Brackett, Nathan (2004), The New Rolling Stone Album Guide, Simon and Schuster, ISBN 0-7432-0169-8
- Bruce, Joseph (2003), ICP: Behind the Paint, Psychopathic Records, ISBN 0-9741846-0-8
