= Bizaar =

Studio album by Insane Clown Posse
- Released: October 31, 2000
- Recorded: 1999–2000
- Studio: Fun House
- Genres: Horrorcore; rap rock
- Length: 66:11
- Labels: Island Records; Psychopathic Records; 548 174
- Producer: Mike E. Clark

Insane Clown Posse chronology
The Amazing Jeckel Brothers (1999)	Bizaar (2000)	Bizzar (2000)

Bizaar is the sixth studio album by the American hip hop group Insane Clown Posse. Released on October 31, 2000, by Island Records in association with Psychopathic Records, it is the first half of the Bizaar Bizzar double album, released the same day as its companion album, Bizzar. It is the 14th overall release by Insane Clown Posse.

== Release and reception ==
Professional ratings
Review scores
Source	Rating
AllMusic	2/5 stars
NME	3/10 stars
The New Rolling Stone Album Guide	3/5 stars

On the August 20, 1999 episode of The Howard Stern Show, Insane Clown Posse clashed with fellow guest Sharon Osbourne, and she bet Violent J $50,000 that ICP's next album would not sell more than 200,000 copies, and that it would be subsequently dropped from its distributor. Violent J then increased the bet, predicting that the group's next album would sell at least 500,000 units.

Bizaar and Bizzar combined to sell 400,000 units, which fell short of Violent J's prediction, but exceeded Sharon Osbourne's expectations. Following the release of the albums, Insane Clown Posse left Island Records after its contract expired because, according to the group, they did not want to release its sixth Joker's Card through Island Records.

Both Bizaar and Bizzar received three-out-of-five-star ratings in The New Rolling Stone Album Guide, the highest rating that the magazine ever gave to any Insane Clown Posse album.

"Tilt-a-Whirl" was ranked by VH1 as one of the 40 Most Awesomely Bad Metal Songs...Ever.

The song "Still Stabbin'" is a sequel to "I Stab People".

== Track listing ==
No.	Title	Writer(s)	Length
1.	"Intro"	Mike E. Clark and ICP	1:07
2.	"Take Me Away"	Mike E. Clark and ICP	4:39
3.	"Fearless"	Mike E. Clark and ICP	4:14
4.	"Rainbows and Stuff"	Mike E. Clark and ICP	4:11
5.	"Whut?" (featuring Twiztid)	ICP and Twiztid	4:55
6.	"Still Stabbin'"	Mike E. Clark and ICP	4:03
7.	"Tilt-a-Whirl"	Mike E. Clark and ICP	3:58
8.	"We Gives No Fuck"	Mike E. Clark and ICP	3:39
9.	"Please Don't Hate Me"	Mike E. Clark and ICP	4:18
10.	"Behind the Paint"	Mike E. Clark and ICP	4:33
11.	"My Homie Baby Mama"	Mike E. Clark and ICP	4:09
12.	"The Pendulum's Promise"	Mike E. Clark and ICP	21:25
Total length:			66:11

== Charts ==
Chart (2000)	Peak position
US Billboard 200	20
