= Bizzar =

Studio album by Insane Clown Posse
- Released: October 31, 2000
- Recorded: 1999–2000
- Studio: Fun House
- Genres: Horrorcore; rap rock
- Length: 67:31
- Labels: Island Records; Psychopathic Records; 548 175
- Producer: Mike E. Clark

Insane Clown Posse chronology
Bizaar (2000)	Bizzar (2000)	The Wraith: Shangri-La (2002)

Bizzar is the seventh studio album by the American hip hop group Insane Clown Posse. Released on October 31, 2000, by Island Records (in association with Psychopathic Records), it is the second half of the Bizzar Bizaar double album, released the same day as its companion album, Bizaar. It is the group's 15th overall release.

== Release and reception ==
Professional ratings
Review scores
Source	Rating
AllMusic	2/5 stars
NME	3/10 stars
The New Rolling Stone Album Guide	3/5 stars

On the August 20, 1999,. episode of The Howard Stern Show, Insane Clown Posse clashed with fellow guest Sharon Osbourne, when she bet Violent J $50,000 that the group's next album would not sell more than 200,000 copies, and that it would be subsequently dropped from its distributor.

Bizaar and Bizzar combined to sell 400,000 units. Following the release of the albums, Insane Clown Posse left Island Records after its contract expired because, according to the group, they did not want to release its sixth Joker's Card through Island Records.

A music video for the song "Let's Go All the Way", a cover of a Sly Fox song, was filmed. MTV agreed to play "Let's Go All the Way" on their network, airing it once in the late evening. Bruce and Utsler decided to bombard Total Request Live (TRL) with requests for the video. While on their Bizzar Bizaar Tour, Insane Clown Posse posted on its website that December 8 was the day for their fans to request the video. Bruce and Utsler named that day "The Mighty Day of Lienda", meaning "The Mighty Day of All or Nothing". On December 8, Rudy Hill, Robert Bruce, Tom Dub, and six other Psychopathic Records employees and friends drove down to New York City. They were met by nearly 400 Insane Clown Posse fans standing outside in front of the TRL studio window, all with signs supporting the duo. Thirty minutes before the show began, Viacom security guards and New York City police officers were dispatched to remove all the fans from the sidewalk. When some fans, including Robert Bruce, refused to move because it was a public street and no other individuals were asked to move, they were assaulted. All telephone requests for the video to be played were ignored, and Insane Clown Posse was never mentioned during the show. MTV later informed Island Records that the heads of the network must choose the band first before it can become eligible to be featured on TRL.

Both Bizaar and Bizzar received three-out-of-five-star ratings in The New Rolling Stone Album Guide, the highest rating that the magazine ever gave to any Insane Clown Posse album.

On July 10, 2017, Richard Newton, a Boston-area juggalo, went to the Top 40 radio station Kiss 108 to make a request for the song "My Axe" in person, with an axe in hand and other weapons, resulting in a three-hour police standoff that ended without injury and the suspect hospitalized for psychiatric evaluation.

== Track listing ==
No.	Title	Writer(s)	Length
1.	"Intro"	Mike E. Clark and ICP	1:55
2.	"Bizzar" (featuring Twiztid and Esham)	Mike E. Clark, ICP, Esham, Twiztid	3:36
3.	"Cherry Pie (I Need a Freak)"	Mike E. Clark and ICP	4:33
4.	"Questions"	Mike E. Clark, ICP, Esham	4:11
5.	"Mr. Happy"	ICP and Twiztid	4:43
6.	"Radio Stars"	Mike E. Clark and ICP	4:33
7.	"My Axe"	Mike E. Clark and ICP	3:52
8.	"If"	Mike E. Clark and ICP	3:39
9.	"Let's Go All the Way"	Mike E. Clark, ICP, Gary Cooper	3:35
10.	"Let a Killa"	Mike E. Clark and ICP	4:56
11.	"Juggalo Paradise"	Mike E. Clark and ICP	3:41
12.	"Crystal Ball" (featuring Twiztid)	Mike E. Clark, ICP, Twiztid	22:44
Total length:			65:58

== Charts ==
Chart (2000)	Peak position
US Billboard 200	21
