= Blaze Ya Dead Homie discography =

This is a list of audio recordings featuring Blaze Ya Dead Homie. He has released 7 studio albums, 5 EP's, 2 re-release, 2 compilation, 1 collaboration album and 1 full length tour exclusive album. He has been signed to Gotham Zone Entertainment (1995—2000), Psychopathic Records (1998—2013), Grundy Entertainment (2013–present), Majik Ninja Entertainment (2014—present).

== Studio albums ==
Title	Details	Peak chart positions						
Title	Details	US	US Current	US R&B/HH	US Rap	US Sales	US Indie	US Heat.
1 Less G n da Hood	Released: October 16, 2001; Label: Psychopathic Records	—	—	86	—	—	25	19
Colton Grundy: The Undying	Released: October 19, 2004; Label: Psychopathic Records	167	167	57	—	167	16	9
Clockwork Gray	Released: August 21, 2007; Label: Psychopathic Records	100	100	34	16	100	14	—
Gang Rags	Released: June 22, 2010; Label: Psychopathic Records	52	49	13	9	52	5	—
Gang Rags: Reborn	Released: October 21, 2014; Label: Majik Ninja Entertainment	106	99	20	12	106	18	—
The Casket Factory	Released: January 15, 2016; Label: Majik Ninja Entertainment	89	31	6	5	42	4	—
Cadaver	Released: October 30, 2020; Label: Majik Ninja Entertainment		46					

=== Extended plays ===
- 2000: Blaze Ya Dead Homie EP
- 2012: Blaze 'n' Bake EP
- 2016: The Casket Maker EP
- 2016: Dead Vulture EP
- 2025: Tales From The Mortuary EP

== Group albums ==
=== w/Dark Lotus (1998—2017) ===
List of studio albums, with selected chart positions
Title	Album details	Peak chart positions					
Title	Album details	US	US HH	US Rap	US Indie	US Heat.	US Taste
Tales from the Lotus Pod	Released: July 17, 2001; Label: Psychopathic Records	158	—	—	6	1	—
Black Rain	Released: April 6, 2004; Label: Psychopathic Records	71	—	—	3	—	—
The Opaque Brotherhood	Released: April 15, 2008; Label: Psychopathic Records	45	23	7	4	—	15
The Mud, Water, Air & Blood	Released: July 29, 2014; Label: Psychopathic Records	43	8	4	4	—	—
"—" denotes releases that did not chart, or was not released in that country.

=== w/Psychopathic Rydas (1999—2017) ===
List of albums, with selected chart positions
Title	Album details	Peak chart positions		
Title	Album details	US	R&B	Ind
Dumpin'	Released: Late 1999; Label: Joe & Joey Records; Format: CD	—	—	—
Ryden Dirtay	Released: July 21, 2001 (GOTJ); Label: Joe & Joey Records; Format: CD	—	—	46
The Pendulum #7 "The Rydas EP"	Released: July 21, 2001 (GOTJ); Label: Joe & Joey Records; Format: CD	—	—	—
Check Your Shit In Bitch!	Released: July 15, 2004 (GOTJ); Label: Joe & Joey Records; Format: CD	—	—	—
Limited Edition EP	Released: July 15, 2004 (GOTJ); Label: Joe & Joey Records; Format: CD	—	—	—
Duk Da Fuk Down	Released: August 9, 2007 (GOTJ); Label: Joe & Joey Records; Format: CD, Digital	—	—	—
EatShitNDie	Released: August 8, 2011 (GOTJ); Label: Joe & Joey Records; Format: CD, Digital	—	—	—
Backdoor Ryda EP	Released: August 9, 2011 (GOTJ); Label: Joe & Joey Records; Format: CD, Digital	—	—	—

=== w/Drive-By (2001—2006; 2007—present) ===
List of albums, with selected chart positions
Title	Album details	Peak chart positions		
Title	Album details	US	R&B	Ind
Pony Down (Prelude): Released: October 6, 2005	Label: Psychopathic Records; Format: CD, Digital			
Pony Down (Prelude) (reissue)	Released: July 22, 2008; Label: Psychopathic Records; Format: CD, Digital			
Back On Da Block EP	Released: Drive-By Tour (February 2013); Label: Native World Inc./Grundy Ent.; Format: CD, Digital			
Run These Streets EP	Released: Drive-By Tour (May 2014)/May 20, 2014 (Nationally); Label: Native World Inc./Grundy Ent.; Format: CD, Digital			
4 The OG's EP	Released: January 12, 2019; Label: Native World Inc./Grundy Ent.; Format: CD, Digital			

=== w/Zodiac MPrint (2006—2009; 2012—present) ===
List of albums, with selected chart positions
Date	Title	Album details	Peak chart positions			
Date	Title	Album details	US	Ind	Rap	R&B/Hip-Hop
May 20, 2016	Ride The Stars EP	Released: May 20, 2016; Label: Majik Ninja Entertainment; Format: CD	—	42	21	35
May 18, 2018	Skywalkers		—	—	—	—

=== w/Triple Threat (2005—present) ===
List of albums, with selected chart positions
Date	Title	Album details	Peak chart positions			
Date	Title	Album details	US	Ind	Rap	R&B/Hip-Hop
Psychomania Tour (May 11, 2017 - nationwide)	Triple Threat EP	Released: May 11, 2017 (Nationwide); Label: Majik Ninja Entertainment; Format: CD	—	—	—	—
September 1, 2017	Triple Threat	Released: September 1, 2017; Label: Majik Ninja Entertainment; Format: CD, Digital	—	—	—	—

== Re-releases ==
- 1 Less G n Da Hood: Deluxe G Edition (2006)
- Gang Rags

== Guest appearances ==
Year	Song	Artist	Album
1997	"Hound Dogs"	Twiztid	Mostasteless
2000	"Where itz Goin' Down"	Twiztid	Freek Show
2001	Juggalo Party	Twiztid	Cryptic Collection Vol. 2
2002	"4 Thoze of U"	Twiztid	Mirror Mirror
2002	"It Rains Diamonds"	Insane Clown Posse	The Wraith: Shangri-La
2003	"Frankenstein"	Twiztid	The Green Book
2003	"Sticky Icky Situations"	Anybody Killa	Hatchet Warrior
2003	"Tools"	Anybody Killa	Hatchet Warrior
2003	"While You're Sleeping"	Anybody Killa	Hatchet Warrior
2003	"Foo Dang"	Anybody Killa	Hatchet Warrior
2003	"Horribly Horrifying"	Violent J	Wizard of the Hood
2003	"What You Thinkin' About?"	Violent J	Wizard of the Hood
2003	"The Wizard's Palace"	Violent J	Wizard of the Hood
2004	"Party at the Liquor Store"	Anybody Killa	Dirty History
2004	"It Doesn't Matta"	Anybody Killa	Dirty History
2004	"Blaze"	Monoxide	Chainsmoker LP
2005	"Bonus Flavor"	Twiztid	Man's Myth
2005	"Triple Threat"	Twiztid	Mutant
2006	"See Thru"	Axe Murder Boyz	Blood In, Blood Out
2006	"Sour Patch Bitches"	Jamie Madrox	Phatso
2006	"Pledge Allegiance"	Jamie Madrox	Phatso
2006	"Red Mist"	Boondox	The Harvest
2006	Look Out	Diamond Cutz Vol. 2 – Villainz vs Heroz	Lavel
2007	"Bussyoheadopen"	Twiztid	Independents Day
2007	"How Quick"	Big B	More To Hate
2008	"Sickness"	DJ Clay	Let 'Em Bleed: The Mixxtape, Vol. 1
2008	"Fear"	Boondox	Krimson Creek
2008	"4Ever Detroit"	DJ Clay	Let 'Em Bleed: The Mixxtape, Vol. 2
2008	"Touch of Death (remix)"	DJ Clay	Let 'Em Bleed: The Mixxtape, Vol. 3
2008	"What U Want from Me"	Anybody Killa	Mudface
2008	"Bodies Fall" (w/ Tech N9ne, Kutt Calhoun, & The R.O.C.)	Prozak	Tales From The Sick
2009	"Everywhere I Go"	DJ Clay	Let 'Em Bleed: The Mixxtape, Vol. 4
2009	"Haul 'em Off"	Liquid Assassin	Apocalypse
2010	"Rock It Out"	DJ Clay	Book of the Wicked, Chapter One
2010	"That Shit You On"	Anybody Killa	Medicine Bag
2010	"Down With the Wicked Shit"	DJ Clay	Book of the Wicked, Chapter Two
2011	"The Paper"	The Dirtball	Nervous System
2011	"Smokin Blunts and Drinkin 40's"	Potluck	Rhymes and Resin:Deluxe Edition
2012	Shout	Insane Clown Posse	Smothered, Covered & Chunked
2013	"Wrong 'N Tough	DJ Clay	"A World Upside Down: The Mixxtape"
2013	Sick Man	Twiztid	A New Nightmare EP
2013	Wasted (w/Johnny Richter, Bukshot, Jared Gomes, Lil Wyte, AJAX, JellyRoll, Liquid Assassin)	Twiztid	A New Nightmare EP
2014	A Place In The Woods	Twiztid	Bootleg Banner Tour (VIP single)
2015	"Tonight"(w/AJAX, Swag Toof, Insane E., Prozak & The R.O.C.)	Twiztid	4/20 single
2015	1 More Body (w/Hed (pe) & Twiztid)	Kottonmouth Kings	Krown Power: Deluxe Edition
2015	Killing Me (w/The R.O.C. & Krizz Kaliko)	Prozak	Black Ink
2016	Dead Girls Don't Say No #2	Kung Fu Vampire	Look Alive
2016	Domination (w/Twiztid & Boondox)	Lex "The Hex" Master	Contact
2017	Psychomania (w/The R.O.C., Lex "The Hex" Master, G-Mo Skee & Boondox)	Twiztid	The Continuous Evilution Of Life's ?'s
2017	Monkey On My Back	Gorilla Voltage	Ape–X
2017	Outlined In Chalk (w/Twiztid, The R.O.C., Lex "The Hex" Master, G-Mo Skee & Young Wicked)	Boondox	The Murder
2017	Tear It Up (w/Boondox)	The R.O.C.	Digital Voodoo
2017	I Ain't The One (w/The R.O.C.)	Young Wicked	The Return Of The Prodigal Son
2017	Turn It Up (w/Jamie Madrox, Lex "The Hex" Master & Bonez Dubb	Various	Twiztid Presents: Year Of The Sword
2017	Ignite (w/The R.O.C., Mr. Grey, Monoxide Child & King Gordy	Various	Twiztid Presents: Year Of The Sword
2017	Better Than Ever B4 (w/Lex "The Hex" Master, G-Mo Skee & Axe Murder Boyz)	Various	Twiztid Presents: Year Of The Sword
2017	Flix N Chill (w/Young Wicked & Clockworc)	Various	Twiztid Presents: Year Of The Sword
2017	Get High (w/Young Wicked, Mr. Grey, Bonez Dubb & Last American Rock Stars)	Various	Twiztid Presents: Year Of The Sword
2017	B.N.U. (w/G-Mo Skee, Gorilla Voltage, Jamie Madrox, Young Wicked, Bonez Dubb & Last American Rock Stars)	Various	Twiztid Presents: Year Of The Sword
2018	Thanos (w/Twiztid, Tech N9ne, Krizz Kaliko, Rittz, JellyRoll, Crucifix and King ISO)	The Underground Avengers	Anomaly88
2019	Gansta (w/ Skeddy The Aabomination & Syx Trismegistus)	Lex "The Hex" Master	Strictly For My Ninjas
2019	Wasted 3 (w/ Twiztid, Rittz, Young Wicked, King Gordy, The R.O.C., G-Mo Skee & Redd)	Various	Songs To Smoke To
2019	Aey Yay	Various	Songs To Smoke To
2020	Insane (W/ Jamie Madrox & Boondox)	Lex "The Hex" Master	Haunted Mansion [Episode 2]
2020	Boomstick!	Oh! The Horror	Halloween 365
2020	Murder Carnage (w/ Jamie Madrox, Lex The Hex Master, & Boondox)	Various	Songs Of Samhain
2020	2 Signs (w/ Kyne)	Redd	Symphony Of Sympathy
2020	Burn It Down	Erratic	Apocalyption
2021	What Is Dead [May Never Die] (w/ Rozz Dyliams)	Scum	Out With The Old Vol.2: Collabz
2021	U Can Miss Me (w/ Jamie Madrox & Boondox)	Gibby Stites	The 13th Wonder

== Singles ==
Year	Song	Artist	Album
2001	Grave Ain't No Place	Blaze Ya Dead Homie (ft. Anybody Killa & Monoxide Child)	1 Less G n da Hood
2004	Bump This SHHHH	Blaze Ya Dead Homie	Colton Grundy: The Undying
2004	Stick Ya Hands Up	Blaze Ya Dead Homie (ft. Anybody Killa)	Colton Grundy: The Undying
2007	Toe Tags N Body Bags	Blaze Ya Dead Homie (ft. Jamie Madrox)	Clockwork Gray
2010	I'm Back	Blaze Ya Dead Homie	Gang Rags
2013	Let It Burn	Blaze Ya Dead Homie	Drive-By Tour 2013 single
2014	Napalm	Blaze Ya Dead Homie	Gang Rags: Reborn
2014	Give Em What They Want	Blaze Ya Dead Homie (ft. The R.O.C.)	Gang Rags: Reborn
2015	Ghost	Blaze Ya Dead Homie (ft. Kung Fu Vampire)	The Casket Factory
2015	Wormfood	Blaze Ya Dead Homie (ft. DJ Swamp)	The Casket Factory
2015	Bleed	Blaze Ya Dead Homie	Free Download Single
2015	They Call That Gangsta	Blaze Ya Dead Homie (ft. The R.O.C. & Lex "The Hex" Master)	The Casket Factory
2017	Eternal	Blaze Ya Dead Homie	The Casket Factory
2017	2 Middle Fingerz	Blaze Ya Dead Homie	The Casket Factory
2018	Go Go Go Go	Blaze Ya Dead Homie	Fam Appreciation Month Free Single
2025	Bloody	Non-Album Single	

== Music videos ==
Year	Title	Director(s)	Album	Artist	Role
2000	We Don't Die		Freek Show	Twiztid	Cameo
2002	Homies		The Wraith: Shangri-La	Insane Clown Posse	Cameo
2005	Story Of Our Lives		Man's Myth (Vol. 1)	Twiztid	Cameo
2005	Triple Threat		Mutant (Vol. 2)	Twiztid	Main Performer
2006	Red Mist (w/Twiztid)		The Harvest	Boondox	Featured Performer
2007	I'll Connect (ft. The R.O.C.)		Clockwork Gray	Blaze Ya Dead Homie	Main Performer
2009	Raw Deal (The Juggalo Song)		Independents Day	Twiztid	Cameo
2009	In Yo Face		Bang! Pow! Boom!	Insane Clown Posse	Cameo
2010	Bad Bad Man		No Album	Violent JJ	Cameo
2011	Triple Threat		Man's Myth (Vol. 1)	Twiztid	Featured Performer
2011	Dead Man Walking		Gang Rags	Blaze Ya Dead Homie	Main Performer
2012	Dub Sack		Gang Rags	Blaze Ya Dead Homie	Main Performer
2014	Blaze Up		Clockwork Gray	Blaze Ya Dead Homie	Main Performer
2014	Napalm		Gang Rags: Reborn	Blaze Ya Dead Homie	Main Performer
2014	Sick Man		A New Nightmare EP	Twiztid	Featured Performer
2015	Ghost Bars		Gang Rags: Reborn	Blaze Ya Dead Homie	Main Performer
2015	They Call That Gangsta (ft.The R.O.C. & Lex "The Hex" Master)		The Casket Factory	Blaze Ya Dead Homie	Main Performer
2016	Who U Lookin' 4? (ft. Boondox & Jamie Madrox)		The Casket Factory	Blaze Ya Dead Homie	Main Performer
2016	Keep It Jumpin'		Ride The Stars EP	Zodiac MPrint	Main Performer
2017	Outlined In Chalk (w/Twiztid, The R.O.C., Lex "The Hex" Master, G-Mo Skee, Gorilla Voltage & Young Wicked)		The Murder	Boondox	Featured Performer
2017	Eternal		The Casket Factory	Blaze Ya Dead Homie	Main Performer
2017	Real G Shit		Blaze Ya Dead Homie EP	Blaze Ya Dead Homie	Main Performer
2017	2nd Hand Smoke		Mostasteless	Twiztid	Cameo
2018	2 Middle Fingerz		The Casket Factory	Blaze Ya Dead Homie	Main Performer
2018	My Trunk	Doenut	Twiztid Presents: Year Of The Sword	Blaze Ya Dead Homie	Main Performer
2024	Smoke Train (w/Joe Black)		The Chainsmoker II (Bonus Edition)	Monoxide	Featured Performer

== Group Music Videos ==
Year	Title	Director(s)	Album	Artist	Role
2007	Duk Da Fuk Down		Duk Da Fuk Down	Psychopathic Rydas	Main Performer
2016	Keep It Jumpin		Ride The Stars EP	Zodiac MPrint	Main Performer
2017	R.I.P.		Triple Threat	Triple Threat	Main Performer
