= Anybody Killa discography =

Hip hop recording artist discography

Anybody Killa has released six studio albums: five on Psychopathic Records, one on Slangtown Records, and a re-release on his own label, Native World Inc. He has also released one EP and one greatest hits album on Psychopathic Records. He has released seven other EPs on his own record label, Native World Inc.

== Albums ==
=== Studio albums ===
List of studio albums, with selected chart positions
Title	Album details	Peak chart positions					
Title	Album details	US	US R&B/HH	US Rap	US Sales	US Indie	US Heat.
Rain from the Sun	Released: 2000	—	—	—	—	—	—
Hatchet Warrior	Released: April 8, 2003; Label: Psychopathic Records	98	42	—	98	4	—
Dirty History	Released: July 27, 2004; Label: Psychopathic Records	152	53	—	152	10	7
Mudface	Released: November 25, 2008; Label: Psychopathic Records	—	—	15	—	43	—
Medicine Bag	Released: October 19, 2010; Label: Psychopathic Records	117	18	12	108	15	—
Tampon Juice	Released: July 26, 2019; Label: Native World Inc.	—	—	—	—	—	—
"—" denotes releases that did not chart, or was not released in that country.

== Extended plays ==
Title	Release date	Peak chart positions
Title	Release date	US Indie
Road Fools	March 22, 2005	23
Orange Halloween 2006	October 2006	—
Black Halloween 2006	October 2006	—
Holiday Jingles	December 2006	—
Devilish (Orange Black 2007)	October 2007	—
Frosty the Dopeman (Holiday Jingles 2007)	December 2007	—
Perception vs Reality	2012	—
Shapeshifter: prelude EP	July 23, 2015 (GOTJ)	—
Naughty List (Holiday Jingles 2017)	December 1, 2017	—
Wanna Smoke EP	April 20, 2018	—
Smoke That Up EP	April 20, 2021	—

== Mixtapes ==
Title	Release date
Detroit Warriors: Strike 1 Mixx	2006
Detroit Warriors: Strike 2 Mixx	2006
Killa Features	July 4, 2017
Killa Double Features	October 13, 2017
Killa Triple Features	May 11, 2018

== Compilations ==
Title	Release date
The Perfection Collection	June 10, 2014
The Lost War Chief Sessions	July 28, 2016
The Lost War Chief Sessions Vol. 2	2021

== Valentine's Day singles ==
Year	Song
2016	Final Love
2017	My Baby
2018	Love Bites

== Halloween singles ==
Year	Song	Guest
2006	All Hallows Day	AJAX & Strict9
2012	Priscilla	
2015	Deadly	
2016	Blame The Witch	
2016	Who's Watching?	
2017	Scared Of Nothin	
2018	Walking Alone	

== Christmas singles ==
Year	Song	Guest
2013	A Killa Story	
2018	You Ah Scrooge	

== 4/20 singles ==
Year	Song	Guest
2018	Wanna Smoke	

== Group albums ==
=== Krazy Klan ===
Release date	Title
1995	Frustrationz
1999	developMENTAL

=== Dark Lotus ===
Release date	Title	Catalog #	Peak chart positions	
Release date	Title	Catalog #	US	US Indie
July 17, 2001	Tales from the Lotus Pod (rerelease)	PSY-3010	-	-
April 15, 2004	Black Rain	PSY-4024	71	3

=== Psychopathic Rydas ===
List of Psychopathic albums
Title	Album details
Check Your Shit In Bitch!	Released: 2004; Label: Joe & Joey Records; Format: CD
Limited Edition EP	Released: 2004; Label: Joe & Joey Records; Format: CD
Eat Shit N Die	Released: August 8, 2011; Label: Joe & Joey Records; Format: CD
Backdoor Ryda EP	Released: August 8, 2011; Label: Joe & Joey Records; Format: CD

=== Drive-By ===
List of Drive-By albums
Title	Album details
Pony Down (Prelude)	Released: October 6, 2005; Label: Psychopathic Records; Format: CD
Pony Down (Prelude) (rerelease)	Released: July 23, 2008; Label: Psychopathic Records; Format: CD
Back On Da Block	Released: February 22, 2013; Label: Native World Inc. & Grundy Ent.; Format: CD
Run These Streets	Released: May 20, 2014; Label: Native World Inc. & Grundy Ent.; Format: CD
4 The OG's	Released: January 20, 2019; Label: Native World Inc. & Grundy Ent.; Format: CD

=== Tha Hav Knots (2014–present) ===
List of Tha Hav Knots albums
Title	Album details
Happy Wicked Holiday (single)	Released: December 7, 2014 (The Family Fun Time Tour - 11/26/2014 – 12/31/2014); Label: Psychopathic Records; Format: CD
We Gonna Rock (single)	Released: Shapeshifter Tour (October 2015); Label: Psychopathic Records; Format: CD
Tha Low Budget EP	Released: July 31, 2019; Label: Psychopathic Records/Native World Inc.; Format: CD

=== Eastside Ninjas ===
List of Eastside Ninjas albums
Title	Album details
Pact Of The 4	Released: June 4, 2021; Label: Majik Ninja Entertainment; Format: CD

== Guest appearances ==
Year	Song	Artist	Album
2000	"Where itz Goin' Down"	Twiztid	Freek Show
2001	"Grave Ain't No Place"	Blaze Ya Dead Homie	1 Less G n da Hood
2001	"Str8 Outta Detroit"	Blaze Ya Dead Homie	1 Less G n da Hood
2001	"Hood Ratz"	Blaze Ya Dead Homie	1 Less G n da Hood
2001	"Thug 4 Life"	Blaze Ya Dead Homie	1 Less G n da Hood
2001	"Hatchet Execution"	Blaze Ya Dead Homie	1 Less G n da Hood
2002	"From The D-E-T"	Mastamind	Unfinished Business
2002	"Birthday Bitches"	Insane Clown Posse	The Wraith: Shangri-La
2002	"It Rains Diamonds"	Insane Clown Posse	The Wraith: Shangri-La
2002	"Homies"	Insane Clown Posse	The Wraith: Shangri-La
2002	"We Belong"	Insane Clown Posse	The Wraith: Shangri-La
2002	"Thy Unveiling"	Insane Clown Posse	The Wraith: Shangri-La
2003	"Everybody Diez"	Twiztid	The Green Book
2003	"The Wizard's Palace"	Violent J	Wizard of the Hood
2004	"Tour Bus"	Fresh Kid Ice	Freaky Chinese
2004	"Shotgun"	Blaze Ya Dead Homie	Colton Grundy: The Undying
2004	"Stick Ya Hands Up"	Blaze Ya Dead Homie	Colton Grundy: The Undying
2004	"Shoe Fitz"	Monoxide Child	Chainsmoker LP
2004	"Evil"	Monoxide Child	Chainsmoker LP
2005	"Bonus Flavor"	Twiztid	Man's Myth (Vol. 1)
2005	"The Industry"	Claas	Celebrity Death
2006	"Owl Face Hoe"	Shaggy 2 Dope	F.T.F.O.
2007	"By Any Means"	Ajax	Out Of Body/Out Of Mind
2007	"This Is Rock"	Flagrant	Musick
2008	"Walk Away"	DJ Clay	Let 'Em Bleed: The Mixxtape, Vol. 3
2009	"Stay High"	Short Dawg	The Black Sheep
2009	"I'm Just Me (Remix)"	DJ Clay	Let 'Em Bleed: The Mixxtape, Vol. 4
2010	"Would You Die For Me"	DJ Clay	Book of the Wicked, Chapter One
2010	"War Paint"		Book of the Wicked, Chapter One
2010	"Party"	Blaze Ya Dead Homie	Gang Rags
2010	"The Poison"	DJ Clay	Book of the Wicked, Chapter Two
2010	"The Wicked Show"	DJ Clay	Book of the Wicked, Chapter Two
2011	"Rules 2 Tha Game"	Blaze Ya Dead Homie	Gang Rags (Uncut & Uncensored)
2012	"Mind Playin' Tricks On Me" (w/ Lil Wyte)	Insane Clown Posse	Smothered, Covered & Chunked
2013	"Let Me Be"	DJ Clay	A World Upside Down: The Mixxtape
2014	"Bleed"	Axe Murder Boyz	The Garcia Brothers
2014	"Monstrosity" (MEC remix) (w/ Aqualeo)	House of Krazees	For The Fam Vol. 2
2014	"Villainous"	Dark Lotus	The Mud, Water, Air & Blood
2015	"All Night Long" (w/ Bonez Dubb)	Young Wicked	Slaughter
2016	"Ratchet"	Blaze Ya Dead Homie	The Casket Factory
2016	"You Fucked Up" (w/ The R.O.C.)	Mr. Y.U.G.	#48205defcode
2016	"Go Get Em" (w/ Bonez Dubb–performed as Tha Hav Knots)	Big Hoodoo	Asylum
2016	"Monster Squad" (w/ Insane Clown Posse, Axe Murder Boyz & DJ Paul)	Big Hoodoo	Asylum
2016	"The Last Warriors"	Str8jaket	Closure
2017	"Judge Of That"		
2018	"Protect Ya Neck"	Hex Rated	Rotten
2018	"Straight Jacket"	Mad V	A Few Screws Loose
2019	"Scrub Til You Shine"	MC Snax	Non Album single
2019	"Seein' Shit"	Tommy James	Brainworms Collabos
2019	"Foo Dang"	Blaze Ya Dead Homie	Graveyard Greats
2019	"Rules 2 Tha Game"	Blaze Ya Dead Homie	Graveyard Greats
2020	"What You Lookin At"	Project Born	Born Dead 3: The Reapers Revenge
2022	"Stay In Yo Lane" (w/Bam Beda, Kung Fu Vampire, DJ Clay, Bukshot, Frank Nitty, Ant G & Big Hoodoo)	Lyte	Metamorphosis

== Original contributions to compilations ==
Year	Song	Artist	Album
2015
2015	"Judge Of That" (w/ Kegan Ault, Flagrant Musick, Strict 9, & Mr. Y.U.G	Various Artist	The Mix
2015	"I Wanna Be Cosby" (w/ Kegan Ault, Flagrant Musick, & Mr. Y.U.G.	Various Artist	The Mix
2015	"I Hate You" (w/ Mr. Y.U.G., Strict 9, & Flagrant Musick	Various Artist	The Mix
2015	"It's My Time" (w/ Strict 9 & Mr. Y.U.G.	Various Artist	The Mix
2015	"Wrap It Up" (w/ Bake Lo, Mr. Y.U.G., & Kegan Ault	Various Artist	Wrap It Up Soundtrack
2015	"I Hate Christmas" (w/ Big Hoodoo, Mr. Y.U.G., Bonez Dubb, & Kegan Ault	Various Artist	Wrap It Up Soundtrack

== Music videos ==
Year	Title	Director(s)	Album	Artist	Role
2002	Homies		The Wraith: Shangri-La	Insane Clown Posse (ft. Twiztid)	Cameo
2004	Hey Y'all	JB Carlin	Dirty History	Anybody Killa	Main performer
2005	Stick & Move	RyRy & ABK	Dirty History	Anybody Killa	Main performer
2005	Party at the Liquor Store	RyRy & ABK	Dirty History	Anybody Killa	Main performer
2005	To Whom This May Concern	RyRy & ABK	Dirty History	Anybody Killa	Main performer
2005	Way We Roll	RyRy & ABK	Road Fools	Anybody Killa	Main performer
2005	All-4-U	RyRy & ABK	Road Fools	Anybody Killa	Main performer
2005	Story Of Our Lives		Man's Myth (Vol. 1)	Twiztid	Cameo
2008	Grind 2 The Flow		Mudface	Anybody Killa	Main performer
2009	In Yo Face		Bang! Pow! Boom!	Insane Clown Posse	Cameo
2009	Juggalo Island		Bang! Pow! Boom!	Insane Clown Posse	Cameo
2011	Last Chance		Medicine Bag	Anybody Killa	Main performer
2011	Nervous		Medicine Bag	Anybody Killa	Main performer
2011	I'm Comin' Swingin'		Medicine Bag	Anybody Killa	Main performer
2011	Psychopathic Psypher 1		No album	Anybody Killa	Featured performer
2011	Psychopathic Psypher 3		No album	Anybody Killa	Featured performer
2012	Psychopathic Psypher 4		No album	Anybody Killa	Featured performer
2013	Peace Pipe		Medicine Bag	Anybody Killa	Main performer
2013	Hey Girl		Medicine Bag	Anybody Killa	Main performer
2015	Christine			Anybody Killa	Main performer
2015	Durag			Anybody Killa	Featured performer
2015	The Middle		Shapeshifter: prelude EP	Anybody Killa	Main performer
2017	If We Were A Gang		No album	Anybody Killa	Featured performer
2017	Judge of That		N/A	Anybody Killa	Main performer
2018	WHOA!			Anybody Killa	Main performer
2019	Watch the Evil				Main performer
