= Axe Murder Boyz discography =

- Studio albums: 9
- Extended plays: 5
- Compilation albums: 1

American hip-hop group Axe Murder Boyz has released 9 studio albums, 1 compilation and 4 extended plays. Their music has been released through record labels Axe Recordings, Canonize Productions, Psychopathic Records, Hatchet House and Majik Ninja Entertainment.

== Discography ==
=== Studio albums ===
Title	Album details	Peak chart positions				
Title	Album details	Album details	US	US R&B/HH	US Indie	US Heat
The Underground Stylistikz	Released: 1999; Label: Axe; Formats: CD	—	—	—	—	—
How Far Will I Go?	Released: 1999; Label: Axe; Formats: CD	—	—	—	—	—
Tormented	Released: 2000; Label: Axe; Formats: CD	—	—	—	—	—
The Galaxy	Released: 2001; Label: Axe; Formats: CD	—	—	—	—	—
The Unforgiven Forest	Released: November 23, 2004; Label: Canonize; Formats: CD, digital download	—	—	—	—	—
Blood In, Blood Out	Released: April 18, 2006; Label: Psychopathic; Formats: CD, digital download	199	—	—	—	—
Gods Hand	Released: June 24, 2008; Label: Hatchet House; Formats: CD, digital download	—	—	—	—	—
The Garcia Brothers	Released: March 25, 2014; Label: Psychopathic; Formats: CD, digital download	—	—	—	—	—
Muerte	Released: June 15, 2018; Label: Majik Ninja; Formats: CD, digital download, vinyl	—	—	—	—	—

=== Compilation albums ===
Title	Album details	Peak chart positions				
Title	Album details	Album details	US	US R&B/HH	US Indie	US Heat
Tha Underground Stylystiks Compilation Album, Vol. 1	Released: 1999; Label: Axe; Formats: CD	—	—	—	—	—

=== Extended plays ===
Title	Album details	Peak chart positions				
Title	Album details	Album details	US	US R&B/HH	US Indie	US Heat
The Down Low	Released: 2001; Label: Axe; Formats: CD	—	—	—	—	—
Vampirez	Released: 2004; Label: Canonize; Formats: CD	—	—	—	—	—
Underdogz	Released: 2004; Label: Canonize; Formats: CD	—	—	—	—	—
Body in a Hole	Released: 2010; Label: Hatchet House; Formats: CD	—	—	—	—	—
Fatality	Released: 2020; Label: Majik Ninja; Formats: CD	—	—	—	—	—
