= Road Fools =

EP by Anybody Killa
- Released: March 22, 2005
- Studio: The Lotus Pod
- Genre: Hip hop
- Length: 25:59
- Label: Psychopathic
- Producer: Fritz The Cat; Lavel

Anybody Killa chronology
Dirty History (2004)	Road Fools (2005)	Mudface (2008)

Professional ratings
Review scores
Source	Rating
AllMusic	2.5/5 stars
RapReviews	5/10

Road Fools is the first extended play by American rapper Anybody Killa. It was released on March 22, 2005, through Psychopathic Records. Recording sessions took place at the Lotus Pod. Production was handled by Fritz The Cat and Lavel. The album did not reach the Billboard 200, however, it peaked at number 23 on the Independent Albums chart.

The EP was distributed with an accompanying DVD that features over 80 minutes of skits, music videos and live performances.

== Track listing ==
No.	Title	Producer(s)	Length
1.	"Intro"		2:45
2.	"Feel This Way"	Lavel	4:19
3.	"Way We Roll"	Lavel	3:37
4.	"Up My Sleeve"	Fritz The Cat	2:40
5.	"We There Yet?"	Lavel	3:26
6.	"Rage"	Fritz The Cat	3:16
7.	"All-4-U"	Fritz The Cat	5:56
Total length:			25:59

No.	Title	Length
8.	"Bonus DVD"

== Personnel ==
- James "Anybody Killa" Lowery – songwriter, vocals
- James "Lavel" Hicks – producer & engineering (tracks: 2, 3, 5)
- Fritz "The Cat" Vankosky – producer & engineering (tracks: 4, 6, 7)
- Michael Scotta – illustration, graphic design

== Charts ==
Chart (2005)	Peak position
US Independent Albums (Billboard)	23
