= Blood In, Blood Out =

Blood In, Blood Out may refer to:

- Blood In Blood Out, a 1993 American film by Taylor Hackford
- Blood In, Blood Out (Axe Murder Boyz album), 2006
- Blood In, Blood Out (Exodus album), 2014
- 13lood 1n + 13lood Out Mixx, a 2020 DJ mix by Denzel Curry
