= Gang Rags: Reborn =

Album by Blaze Ya Dead Homie

Studio album by Blaze Ya Dead Homie
- Released: October 21, 2014
- Recorded: 2009–2010 (Extended); 2014 (Reborn)
- Genres: Hardcore hip hop; gangsta rap; horrorcore; West Coast hip hop
- Length: 52:47
- Labels: Majik Ninja Entertainment, Grundy Entertainment
- Producers: Blaze Ya Dead Homie, The Dead Beatz, Jamie Madrox, Seven

Blaze Ya Dead Homie chronology
Gang Rags (2010)	Gang Rags: Reborn (2014)	The Casket Factory (2016)

Professional ratings
Review scores
Source	Rating
AllMusic	2.5/5 stars

Gang Rags: Reborn is the fifth studio album, and ninth overall album by Blaze Ya Dead Homie, his first release on Majik Ninja Entertainment, and the first release overall by the newly formed label. The album was recorded at "The Dojo", the label's recording studio.

== Background ==
In 2008 it was announced in the song "Kept Grindin'" by DJ Clay featuring Insane Clown Posse, Twiztid, Blaze Ya Dead Homie, Anybody Killa, Axe Murder Boyz and Boondox, Blaze announced that his new album would be called Last House On Dead Street and would be released in 2009. Blaze and Jamie Madrox went to work and began creating the album. The idea was then pushed to the side, and would be released as a tour CD titled Gang Rags: Extended Version (Uncut & Uncensored). In December 2009 on Psychopathic's "Weekly Freekly Weekly" it was announced that Blaze's new album would be titled Gang Rags and it would be produced by Violent J and Mike E. Clark and it would be Blaze's first album without the work of Twiztid in any way. Psychopathic wanted to see how this would work for Blaze, and the album charted at 52 on the Billboard 200, but started to cause waves among the artists. After Twiztid's departure from Psychopathic on December 12, 2012, Blaze was soon to follow. In late 2013/early 2014 Blaze acquired the rights to Gang Rags: Extended Version (Uncut & Uncensored) from Psychopathic Records. In the "New Release Packet" released by INgrooves it explains how the album came about, it says "Blaze and Jamie Madrox contacted Michael 'Seven' Summers and The Dead Beatz to strip away existing beats and recreate the album. Now almost four years later the album sounds the way it should have in 2010". The album features Jamie Madrox and The R.O.C.

== Production ==
Blaze Ya Dead Homie, Jamie Madrox, Michael "Seven" Summers and The Dead Beatz are producers of the album.

== Release ==
The album was scheduled to be released on October 21, 2014. On Twiztid's online store "Twiztid-Shop" they have 3 different pre order packages. The first one you get "Gang Rags: Reborn", a poster, a draw string bag, and an exclusive single of "Rulez 2 Tha Game" ft. Anybody Killa. The second is the album, draw string bag, and the exclusive CD. The third is the album and exclusive CD. In June/July 2014, Blaze released a snippet of "Fuck Shit Up" on his official instagram account. A few weeks later it was announced that Blaze has already recorded a music video for the song "Napalm" and it will be released before the album to help promote it. The video was released on October 5. Twiztid released a promo flyer a week before the release stating, that if you bought "Gang Rags: Reborn" in the first week (October 20–27), you could claim a copy of the original tour exclusive "Gang Rags: Extended Version (Uncut & Uncensored)" album that was released during the Drive-By 2011 Tour.

== Singles ==
The first single from the album, was a 15-second snippet of the song "Fuck Shit Up". The second single is "Napalm" and will be accompanied by a music video. It is also the first music video for the album, and on Twiztid's new label. Blaze also released a snippet for the song "Ghost Bars".

== Music videos ==
On October 5, 2014 the first music video "Napalm" was released. The music video was directed by Ryan Archibald. On January 14, 2015 the second music video "Ghost Bars" was released.

== Track listing ==
No.	Title	Producer(s)	Length
1.	"Ghost Bars"	Seven	3:33
2.	"Shit's Fucked Up"	Seven	2:11
3.	"Napalm"	Seven	2:20
4.	"Give 'em What They Want" (performed by Zodiac MPrint)	Seven	4:45
5.	"Dead Gangsta"	Seven	2:12
6.	"Flavor of the Week"	Seven	1:58
7.	"Rock It Out"	Seven	4:49
8.	"Just Another Fish"	Seven	3:43
9.	"Ten 40oz"	Seven	3:37
10.	"Zombie King"	Seven	3:17
11.	"Lost & Found"	Seven	3:25
12.	"Bout Dat Life" (featuring Jamie Madrox)	The Dead Beatz	4:00
13.	"Fuck Shit Up"	The Dead Beatz	3:01
14.	"Who Is It?" (featuring Jamie Madrox)	Seven	3:34
15.	"Dead Like Me" (performed by Zodiac MPrint featuring Jamie Madrox)	The Dead Beatz	2:59
Total length:			52:47

Majik Ninja Entertainment physical pre-order bonus track
No.	Title	Length
1.	"Rules 2 Tha Game" (performed by Drive-By)	3:13
Total length:		56:00

2011 Tour Exclusive Edition
No.	Title	Length
1.	"Shits Fucked Up"	2:27
2.	"Napalm"	2:14
3.	"Give Em What They Want"	4:35
4.	"Ghetto Benefits" (performed by Zodiac MPrint featuring J10)	4:16
5.	"Flavor of the Week"	1:56
6.	"Ghost Bars"	3:45
7.	"Rock It Out (O.G. Version)"	4:49
8.	"Simply Fresh" (featuring J10)	2:37
9.	"Ten 40oz"	3:41
10.	"Rules 2 Tha Game" (performed by Drive-By)	3:04
11.	"Zombie King"	4:01
12.	"Lost & Found"	3:22
Total length:		39:45

== Personnel ==
- Blaze Ya Dead Homie - Vocals, Lyrics
- Ashley Heidrich - Vocals, Lyrics - (1, 9, 11)
- The R.O.C. - Vocals, Lyrics - (4, 15)
- Jamie Madrox - Vocals, Lyrics - (7, 12, 14, 15)
- Seven - Producer, Engineer - (1, 2, 3, 4, 5, 6, 7, 8, 9, 10, 11, 14)
- The Dead Beatz - Producer, Engineer - (12, 13, 15)

== Charts ==
Chart (2014)	Peak position
US Billboard 200	106
US Independent Albums (Billboard)	18
US Top R&B/Hip-Hop Albums (Billboard)	20
US Top Rap Albums (Billboard)	12
