= Rezawrecktion =

American rapper

- Origin: Montana, United States
- Genres: Christian hip-hop, Native American hip-hop
- Years active: 2003-2005
- Past members: Christian "Supaman" Takes The Gun; Wes "Hvnsent" Stops Jr. Scott "Sabatage" Flatlip, John "Chosen" Ladson

Rezawrecktion were a Native American Music Award-winning hip-hop group. Formed by four members of the Apsáalooke, the band self-released an album in 2005, It's Time, and were nominated for that year's Gospel/Christian Recording Native American Music Award. They won the award and immediately began touring, while working on a second album. The group then became defunct, with Supaman beginning a solo career.
