= Mutant (Vol. 2) =

Studio album by Twiztid
- Released: July 26, 2005
- Recorded: 2005
- Studio: The Lotus Pod
- Genres: Horrorcore; hip-hop; rap rock
- Length: 47:09
- Label: Psychopathic
- Producers: Fritz The Cat; Lavel; Twiztid; Violent J

Twiztid chronology
Man's Myth (Vol. 1) (2005)	Mutant (Vol. 2) (2005)	Independents Day (2007)

Mutant is the fifth studio album by American hip hop duo Twiztid. It was released on July 26, 2005, through Psychopathic Records, as a companion to their fourth studio album Man's Myth, which was released a month earlier the same year. Recording sessions took place at the Lotus Pod. Production was handled by Fritz the Cat, Lavel, Violent J, and Twiztid themselves. It features guest appearances from Blaze Ya Dead Homie, Lavel and Violent J. The album peaked at number 80 on the Billboard 200, number 20 on the Top Rap Albums and number 11 on the Independent Albums in the United States.

In November 2015, Twiztid announced they were remixing and remastering the album for a 2016 re-release. Mutant: Remixed & Remastered was dropped on March 4, 2016, via Majik Ninja Entertainment; it made it to number 114 on the Billboard 200, number 10 on the Top Rap Albums and 6 on the Independent Albums in the US. It was reissued on vinyl in 2023 for the 25th anniversary of the band.

== Music and lyrics ==
While Man's Myth featured an exclusively hip hop-oriented sound, Mutant saw the band move towards rock. According to member Jamie Madrox, "I've always wanted to do a rock album and to date that was the closest thing to it we have ever done, so it holds a special place in my heart."

AllMusic said that "the sound of this album is far closer to Eminem's side of the Detroit hip-hop axis, specifically the cartoonish but musically fierce live-instruments-plus-samples sound of the best D12 tracks".

== Reception ==
Professional ratings for Mutant (Vol. 2)
Review scores
Source	Rating
AllMusic	3.5/5 stars

Professional ratings for Mutant: Remixed & Remastered
Review scores
Source	Rating
AllMusic	3.5/5 stars

AllMusic wrote that Mutant was better than its predecessor, Man's Myth; AllMusic also said that Mutant is "the best album of Twiztid's career, [...] the one on which the duo finally steps out from the shadow of their mentors the Insane Clown Posse". Reviewing Mutant: Remixed & Remastered, AllMusic's David Jeffries called it "a punchier, louder version".

== Track listing ==
No.	Title	Writer(s)	Producer(s)	Length
1.	"The Transformation of a New Civilization"	Jamie Spaniolo; Paul Methric	Fritz The Cat; Twiztid^{[a]}	2:48
2.	"Get Off of Me!"	Spaniolo; Methric	Fritz The Cat; Twiztid^{[a]}	3:41
3.	"Stardust"	Spaniolo; Methric	Fritz The Cat; Twiztid^{[a]}	3:57
4.	"Familiar"	Spaniolo	Fritz The Cat; Monoxide Child	3:17
5.	"Madness"	Spaniolo; Methric	Violent J	3:58
6.	"Fuck U Part 2"	Spaniolo; Methric	Fritz The Cat	1:01
7.	"Jenny's a Fat Bitch"			0:35
8.	"Fantasy"	Spaniolo; Methric	Fritz The Cat	3:38
9.	"Who Am I?"	Spaniolo; Methric	Fritz The Cat	2:22
10.	"The Truth Will Set You Free"	Spaniolo; Methric	Fritz The Cat	3:47
11.	"Respirator"	Spaniolo; Methric	Fritz The Cat	4:04
12.	"Triple Threat" (featuring Blaze Ya Dead Homie)	Spaniolo; Methric; Christopher Rouleau	Lavel	3:12
13.	"Starve Your Fear"	Spaniolo; Methric	Fritz The Cat; Twiztid^{[a]}	3:01
14.	"Manikin" (featuring Violent J and Lavel)	Spaniolo; Methric; Joseph Bruce	Fritz The Cat	3:38
15.	"Note 2 Self"	Spaniolo	Fritz The Cat	4:10
Total length:				47:09

DVD
No.	Title	Length
16.	"Story Of Our Lives"
17.	"Mutant (Vol. 2) Lyrics"
18.	"Purple Preview"

Notes

- ^{^[a]} signifies an additional producer.

== Personnel ==
- Jamie "Jamie Madrox" Spaniolo – vocals, additional producer (tracks: 1–3, 13), arrangement, mixing (tracks: 1, 9–12, 15), cover artwork, concept
- Paul "Monoxide Child" Methric – vocals, producer (track 4), additional producer (tracks: 1–3, 13), arrangement, mixing (tracks: 1, 4, 9–12, 15), cover artwork, concept
- Chris "Blaze Ya Dead Homie" Rouleau – vocals (track 12)
- Joseph "Violent J" Bruce – vocals (track 14), producer (track 5), mixing (tracks: 3, 5, 7, 13, 14)
- James "Lavel" Hicks – vocals (track 14), producer (track 12), arrangement
- Fritz "The Cat" Van Kosky – guitar (tracks: 2, 4, 6, 9, 11–13, 15), drums (tracks: 6, 15), producer (tracks: 1–4, 6, 8–11, 13–15), arrangement, mixing (tracks: 1, 4, 6, 10–12, 15)
- Devin The Demonic – guitar (track 2)
- Deff Jeff Shankn – drums (tracks: 2, 4, 9, 11)
- Joseph "Shaggy 2 Dope" Utsler – scratches (track 5)

== Charts ==
Weekly chart performance for Mutant (Vol. 2)
Chart (2005)	Peak position
US Billboard 200	80
US Top Rap Albums (Billboard)	20
US Independent Albums (Billboard)	11

Weekly chart performance for Mutant: Remixed & Remastered
Chart (2016)	Peak position
US Billboard 200	114
US Top Album Sales (Billboard)	46
US Top Rap Albums (Billboard)	10
US Independent Albums (Billboard)	6
