= Man's Myth (Vol. 1) =

Studio album by Twiztid
- Released: June 28, 2005
- Recorded: 2004–2005
- Studio: The Lotus Pod
- Genre: Horrorcore
- Length: 49:02
- Label: Psychopathic
- Producers: Esham; Fritz The Cat; Lavel; The R.O.C.; Twiztid

Twiztid chronology
The Green Book (2003)	Man's Myth (Vol. 1) (2005)	Mutant (Vol. 2) (2005)

Professional ratings
Review scores
Source	Rating
AllMusic	3.5/5 stars

Man's Myth is the fourth studio album by American hip hop duo Twiztid. It was released on June 28, 2005, through Psychopathic Records. Recording sessions took place at the Lotus Pod. Production was handled by Fritz The Cat, Lavel, The R.O.C., Esham, and Twiztid themselves, with Violent J serving as additional producer. It features cameo appearances from Blaze Ya Dead Homie, Lavel, Anybody Killa, Shaggy 2 Dope and Violent J. The album peaked at number 62 on the Billboard 200, number 14 on the Top Rap Albums and number 4 on the Independent Albums in the United States.

Its sequel, Mutant (Vol. 2), was released in July 2005.

== Track listing ==
No.	Title	Writer(s)	Producer(s)	Length
1.	"Introduction" (featuring Shaggy 2 Dope)	Jamie Spaniolo; Paul Methric	Fritz The Cat; Lavel; Twiztid	2:23
2.	"Karma"	Spaniolo; Methric	Fritz The Cat	3:55
3.	"Story of Our Lives"	Spaniolo; Methric	Fritz The Cat; The R.O.C.	4:57
4.	"Won't Die" (featuring Violent J)	Spaniolo; Methric	Lavel; Violent J^{[a]}; Twiztid^{[a]}	3:27
5.	"Get It Right" (featuring Lavel and Blaze Ya Dead Homie)	Spaniolo; Methric	Lavel	3:47
6.	"So High" (featuring Blaze Ya Dead Homie and Violent J)	Spaniolo; Methric; Joseph Bruce	Fritz The Cat; The R.O.C.	5:21
7.	"Off the Chain"	Spaniolo; Methric	Lavel; Twiztid	2:42
8.	"Controversy"	Spaniolo; Methric	Fritz The Cat; The R.O.C.	3:40
9.	"Get Ready"	Spaniolo; Methric; Bruce	Lavel; Twiztid^{[a]}	3:22
10.	"Fuck U" (featuring Blaze Ya Dead Homie, Lavel and Anybody Killa)	Spaniolo; Methric	Lavel	0:59
11.	"Feel This"	Spaniolo; Methric	Lavel	2:49
12.	"Entity" (featuring Shaggy 2 Dope)	Spaniolo; Methric; Joseph Utsler	Lavel	4:06
13.	"The Argument" (featuring Annette and Her Crazy Girl)	Spaniolo; Methric	Esham	3:19
14.	"Bonus Flavor"			4:15
Total length:				49:02

Notes

- ^{^[a]} signifies an additional producer.

Sample credits

- Track 14 is a cover of Luniz song "I Got 5 on It (Remix)".

== Personnel ==
- Jamie "Jamie Madrox" Spaniolo – vocals, producer (tracks: 1, 7), additional producer (tracks: 4, 9), arrangement, mixing (tracks: 1–3, 5–8, 10–13), cover artwork, concept
- Paul "Monoxide Child" Methric – vocals, producer (tracks: 1, 7), additional producer (tracks: 4, 9), arrangement, mixing (tracks: 1–3, 5–8, 10–13), cover artwork, concept
- Joseph "Shaggy 2 Dope" Utsler – additional vocals (track 1)
- Joseph "Violent J" Bruce – additional vocals and additional producer (track 4), mixing (track 9)
- Chris "Blaze Ya Dead Homie" Rouleau – additional vocals (tracks: 5, 6, 10, 12)
- James "Lavel" Hicks – additional vocals (tracks: 5, 6, 10), producer (tracks: 1, 4, 5, 7, 9–12), arrangement, mixing (tracks: 1, 2)
- James "Anybody Killa" Lowery – additional vocals (track 10)
- Annette and Her Crazy Girl – additional vocals (track 13)
- Fritz "The Cat" Van Kosky – producer (tracks: 1–3, 6, 8), arrangement, mixing (tracks: 1–8, 10–13)
- Bryan "The R.O.C." Jones – producer (tracks: 3, 6, 8)
- Esham A. Smith – producer (track 13)

== Charts ==
Weekly chart performance for Man's Myth (Vol. 1)
Chart (2005)	Peak position
US Billboard 200	62
US Top Rap Albums (Billboard)	14
US Independent Albums (Billboard)	4
