= The Unforgiven Forest =

Studio album by Axe Murder Boyz
- Released: November 23, 2004
- Label: Canonize

Axe Murder Boyz chronology
Tormented (2000)	The Unforgiven Forest (2004)	Blood In, Blood Out (2006)

The Unforgiven Forest is the fifth studio album by the American hip-hop duo Axe Murder Boyz, released on November 23, 2004, by Canonize Productions.

== Track listing ==
No.	Title	Length
1.	"Intro"	3:23
2.	"Threat"	3:26
3.	"IBEDA1"	5:22
4.	"Like This Skit / All I Know"	3:34
5.	"Mystery"	3:25
6.	"Pray"	3:55
7.	"Zoned"	3:33
8.	"Wanna Know? / Dream"	4:56
9.	"Choice"	3:10
10.	"Quicksand"	4:56
11.	"Imagine This"	4:32
12.	"War Angels" (feat. The R.O.C.)	3:55
13.	"Cutthroat"	3:26
14.	"Where We Go"	3:48
15.	"The Unforgiven Forest"	1:16
16.	"The Bodies"	2:01
17.	"The Arachs"	2:53
18.	"The Trees"	3:44
19.	"The Demon"	6:40
Total length:		74:35
