= Supaman =

American rapper

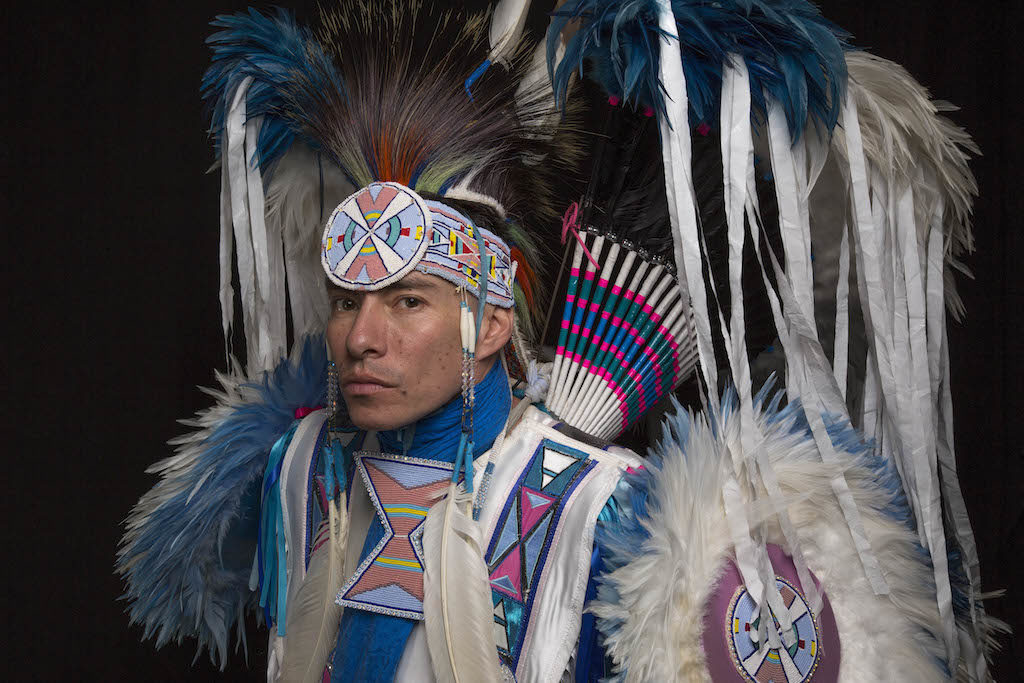
- Supaman in 2018

Background information
- Also known as: Billy Ills
- Born: Christian Parrish Takes the Gun
- Origin: Crow Agency, Montana
- Genres: Native American hip hop
- Formerly of: Rezawrecktion
- Website: www.supamanhiphop.net

Christian Parrish Takes the Gun, known professionally as Supaman, is an Apsáalooke rapper and fancy war dancer who grew up in Crow Agency, Montana.

The child of parents who struggled with alcoholism, Supaman spent part of his childhood in foster care before being raised by his mother. He began DJing in the 90s after hearing a Litefoot song (with the two touring together in 1999), In the fourth grade, Christian began dancing at powwows. While in elementary school, he began to write poetry and later began to rap. He related to rap music because he felt he was going through the same issues that most artists were rapping about. Taking the name "Supaman" at the spur of the moment in a DJ competition, he began rapping in a more original style until he had a spiritual encounter that told him to live a better lifestyle and rap about more meaningful and inspirational topics. In the spiritual encounter, Supaman said his creator "let [him] know [he] was to do everything on [his] own."

In 2003, Supaman founded the Native American hip-hop group Rezawrecktion, whose first album, It's Time, won a Native American Music Award in 2005. Since then, he has released four solo albums and received coverage and plaudits for the song "Why?" featuring Acosia Red Elk. In his hit track, "Prayer Loop Song", Supaman utilizes various instruments including the drum and the ute all while beatboxing, rapping, and remixing different Native tracks. His reasoning for the song and video was an audition tape for America's Got Talent. Alongside rapping, he also tours schools, where he educates students about Native American history and culture. He performed on the live music MTV show Wonderland. In 2013, his music and his fancy dancing skills were featured on a float for the Macy's Thanksgiving Day Parade. Supaman is known for performing his music while wearing his traditional fancy dance outfit. He started doing this by accident when he was forced to do his musical performance right after he had performed a fancy dance while at a show for a school. Supaman typically fuses spiritual concepts and ideas with his rap music. Supaman creates all of his albums by himself, doing everything from singing and writing the music to creating and designing the covers.

Supaman is a supporter of the Dakota Access Pipeline protests, frequently visiting Standing Rock to perform and speak. He is featured alongside MAG7 in the Taboo video "Stand Up / Stand N Rock #NoDAPL" which won the MTV Video Music Award for Best Video with a Social Message in 2017. He has also been nominated for and received multiple awards for his work as a DJ, singer, and rapper, and a fancy dancer including the Tuney Award which he won seven times, the Aboriginal Peoples Music Choice Award, and the North America Indigenous Music Award.

In January 2018, Supaman released his fifth album, Illuminatives. In May 2021, he released his album Medicine Bundle.

== Discography ==
- It's Time (2005, with Rezawrecktion)
- Honest to God (2007)
- Crow Hop (2008)
- Deadly Penz (2009)
- Gorilla (2013)
- Illuminatives (2018)
- Medicine Bundle (2021)
- The Dream (2024)
