= Acosia Red Elk =

World champion Native American jingle dress dancer

- Born: Young Swan Rising From the Water; 1980 (age 44–45); Confederated Tribes of the Umatilla Indian Reservation; Pendleton, Oregon, U.S.
- Citizenship: United States
- Occupation: Dancer
- Years active: 1998-present
- Career
- Dances: Jingle dancer

Acosia Red Elk (born 1980) is a jingle dress dancer from the Umatilla people of Oregon. A descendant of Hin-mah-too-yah-lat-kekt, she did not become interested in dancing until she was 16, when she taught herself to dance from videos of other jingle dancers. Red Elk began dancing professionally in 1998 with her then-husband, Paris Leighton, visiting up to 50 pow wows a year for ten years.

== Biography ==
Acosia Red Elk's parents owned an auto body business. When she was six years old, she caught on fire and burnt the backside of her body and subsequently spent three months in the Legacy Oregon Burn Center in Portland. Her father died on her ninth birthday of complications related to alcoholism. Her first jingle dress was a Christmas gift from her sister, after the death of her father.

== Pow Wow Dancer and Yoga ==
From 2004 to 2008, she won five world championships at the Gathering of Nations; she won again in 2011, 2014, and 2015. For the 2015 competition Red Elk decided to enter at the last minute and had to sew a dress the day before leaving home for the pow wow. In addition to winning the championship in 2005 at Gathering, she won the Head Woman Dancer title. In 2014, having entered 8 competitions, she won all of them. She performed in Supaman's video for the song Why?, having met him on the pow wow circuit.

In 2014 Red Elk took her first Buti yoga class. She was so moved by the experience that she obtained a yoga teaching certificate so that she could guide others through the experience. Combining the movements and meditations of Buti yoga and the footwork of jingle dress dancing, Red Elk created pow wow yoga.

In 2020, she appeared in the music video for the Portugal. The Man feat. "Weird Al" Yankovic song "Who's Gonna Stop Me." In 2024, she played a Choctaw ancestor in the Marvel Studios television series Echo.
