= Hatchet Warrior =

Studio album by Anybody Killa
- Released: April 8, 2003
- Recorded: 2002–03
- Genre: Native American hip hop; hardcore hip hop; gangsta rap
- Length: 53:05
- Label: Psychopathic
- Producer: Fritz The Cat; Monoxide Child; Violent J; Zug Izland

Anybody Killa chronology
| Rain from the Sun (2000) | Hatchet Warrior (2003) | Dirty History (2004) |

Professional ratings
Review scores
| Source | Rating |
|---|---|
| AllMusic | 2/5 stars |

Hatchet Warrior is the second solo studio album by American rapper Anybody Killa. It was released on April 8, 2003, through Psychopathic Records. Production was handled by Zug Izland, Fritz the Cat, Monoxide Child and Violent J, with co-producers Eric Koder and Shaggy 2 Dope. It features guest appearances from Insane Clown Posse, Blaze Ya Dead Homie, Esham, Zug Izland, Twiztid and Paris.

The album peaked at number 98 on the Billboard 200, number 42 on the Top R&B/Hip-Hop Albums and number 4 on the Independent Albums in the United States.

== Background ==
Formerly known as Native Funk, Anybody Killa made his first appearance in the Juggalo world on the Dark Lotus song "Drunken Ninja Master" recorded specifically for Twiztid's 2001 compilation album Cryptic Collection Vol. 2. He then went on to have multiple appearances on Blaze Ya Dead Homie's debut album 1 Less G n da Hood, and with the overwhelmingly positive response from the fans, ABK recorded his first album for Psychopatic Records from 2002 through early 2003.

The album went through various name changes before its release date, including Foo Dang and Psychopathic Warrior.

== Legacy ==
In his review for AllMusic, Johnny Loftus wrote: "Lines like 'Shootin' off my arrows like AKs' and broad references to the 'native hydro' -- which may or may not be peyote -- make ABK's act seem gimmicky, not menacing, and certainly don't establish him as a new voice in Native American hip hop".

It was announced that while on 2017 April Fools Foolin' tour with Mr. Y.U.G., Mad V and Jay Villain, Anybody Killa will also be doing a Hatchet Warrior Show with fellow Michigan-based rapper Skitzo, performing the album in its entirety at selected locations.

== Track listing ==
| No. | Title | Lyrics | Music | Length |
|---|---|---|---|---|
| 1. | "Intro" | Michael J. Puwal | Michael J. Puwal | 1:20 |
| 2. | "Close Call" | James Lowery | Puwal | 1:29 |
| 3. | "Kill Me" | James Spaniolo | Fritz Vankosky; Paul Methric | 2:12 |
| 4. | "Sticky Icky Situation" (featuring Blaze Ya Dead Homie, Violent J and Esham) | Lowery; Chris Rouleau; Joseph Bruce; Esham Smith | Puwal; Joseph Bruce | 4:04 |
| 5. | "Ya Neden's Haunted" (featuring Insane Clown Posse and Esham) | Lowery; Bruce | Puwal | 3:37 |
| 6. | "Ghetto Neighbor" (featuring Monoxide Child, Paris, Violent J and Syn) | Lowery; Paul Methric; Oscar Jackson, Jr. | Vankosky; Methric | 4:03 |
| 7. | "Come Out to Play" (featuring Jamie Madrox and Violent J) | Lowery; Spaniolo; Bruce; Smith | Puwal | 3:42 |
| 8. | "Hated Me" (featuring Violent J) | Lowery | Puwal | 5:24 |
| 9. | "Tools" (featuring Blaze Ya Dead Homie) | Lowery; Rouleau | Puwal | 2:49 |
| 10. | "While You're Sleeping" | Lowery | Puwal | 3:53 |
| 11. | "Hollowpoint" (featuring Violent J and Syn) | Lowery | Vankosky | 4:28 |
| 12. | "Now You Know" (featuring Shaggy 2 Dope) | Lowery; Joseph Utsler | Puwal | 3:00 |
| 13. | "Foo Dang" (featuring Blaze Ya Dead Homie, Barry and Dan Miller) | Lowery; Rouleau | Vankosky; Methric | 4:03 |
| 14. | "Gang Related" (featuring Insane Clown Posse and Syn) | Lowery; Bruce | Vankosky; Methric | 4:49 |
| 15. | "In the City" (featuring Lil' Pig) | Joe Walsh; Lowery | Joe Walsh | 4:12 |
| Total length: | | | | 53:05 |

== Personnel ==
Vocalists

- James "Anybody Killa" Lowery – vocals
- Joseph "Violent J" Bruce – vocals (tracks: 4–8, 11, 14)
- Chris "Blaze Ya Dead Homie" Rouleau – vocals (tracks: 4, 9, 13)
- Esham Smith – vocals (tracks: 4, 5)
- Joseph "Shaggy 2 Dope" Utsler – vocals (tracks: 5, 12, 14)
- Paul "Monoxide" Methric – vocals (track 6)
- Oscar "Paris" Jackson Jr. – vocals (track 6)
- Syn – vocals (tracks: 6, 11, 14)
- James "Jamie Madrox" Spaniolo – vocals (track 7)
- Dan Miller – vocals (track 13)
- Barry – vocals (track 13)
- Ashley "Lil' Pig" Horak – vocals (track 15)

Instrumentalists

- Michael "Mike P." Puwal – programming (tracks: 1, 2, 4, 5, 7–10, 12, 15), additional guitar (track 14)
- Fritz "The Cat" Van Kosky – programming (tracks: 3, 6, 11, 13, 14)
- Violent J – programming (tracks 4)
- Syn – additional guitar (track 6)
- Lil' Pig – live drums (tracks: 8, 12, 14)
- Shaggy 2 Dope – live cuts (track 12)
- Zug Izland – programming (track 15)

Production

- Mike P – producer (tracks: 1, 2, 4, 5, 7–10, 12, 15)
- Fritz the Cat – producer (tracks: 3, 6, 11, 13, 14)
- Monoxide – producer (tracks: 3, 6, 13, 14)
- Violent J – producer (track 4), co-producer (tracks: 1–3, 5–14)
- Zug Izland – producers (track 15)
- Eric Koder – co-producer (tracks: 6, 11, 14)
- Shaggy 2 Dope – co-producer (track 12)

Technicals

- Mike P – engineering & mixing (tracks: 1, 2, 4, 5, 7–10, 12, 15), co-mixing (tracks: 3, 6, 11, 13, 14)
- Fritz the Cat – engineering & mixing (tracks: 3, 6, 11, 13, 14)
- Monoxide – engineering & mixing (tracks: 3, 6, 13, 14)
- Violent J – engineering & mixing (track 4), co-mixing (tracks: 1–3, 5, 6, 9, 11–14)
- Zug Izland – engineering & mixing (track 15)
- Eric Koder – co-mixing (tracks: 6, 11, 14)
- Shaggy 2 Dope – co-mixing (track 12)

== Charts ==
| Chart (2003) | Peak position |
|---|---|
| US Billboard 200 | 98 |
| US Top R&B/Hip-Hop Albums (Billboard) | 42 |
| US Independent Albums (Billboard) | 4 |
