= Medicine Bag =

Studio album by Anybody Killa
- Released: October 19, 2010
- Recorded: 2009–10
- Studio: The Lotus Pod (Detroit, MI)
- Genre: Underground hip hop
- Length: 53:41
- Label: Psychopathic
- Producer: Brian Kuma; Eric Davie

Anybody Killa chronology
Mudface (2008)	Medicine Bag (2010)	Tampon Juice (2019)

Professional ratings
Review scores
Source	Rating
AllMusic	3.5/5 stars

Medicine Bag is the fifth solo studio album by American rapper Anybody Killa. It was released on October 19, 2010, via Psychopathic Records in three different versions, each featuring two different bonus tracks. Recording sessions took place at the Lotus Pod in Detroit. Production was primarily handled by Brian Kuma, except for several bonus tracks produced by Eric Davie. It features guest appearances from Axe Murder Boyz, Blaze Ya Dead Homie and Insane Clown Posse.

The album peaked at No. 117 on the Billboard 200, No. 18 on the Top R&B/Hip-Hop Albums, No. 12 on the Top Rap Albums and No. 15 on the Independent Albums in the United States.

== Production ==
Anybody Killa began working on a concept album entitled Possessed, which was later scrapped in favor of this album.

AllMusic's David Jeffries compared the album's musical style to Cypress Hill, Funkdoobiest and Mike E. Clark, stating that on Medicine Bag "ABK reveals himself as one of Psychopathic's more talented artists".

== Track listing ==
All tracks are written by James Lowery and Brian Kuma.

No.	Title	Length
1.	"The Meaning"	0:41
2.	"Medicine Bag"	3:32
3.	"Get Down"	2:55
4.	"I'm Comin Swingin"	3:26
5.	"Last Chance"	4:21
6.	"Brace Yo Self" (featuring Axe Murder Boyz)	4:10
7.	"Nervous"	3:04
8.	"Lose Control"	3:04
9.	"That Shit U On" (featuring Blaze Ya Dead Homie)	2:54
10.	"Super Killa Fragilistic"	2:42
11.	"Tired of Asking"	4:38
12.	"That's Enough 4 Me"	3:46
13.	"Keep It Wicked" (featuring Insane Clown Posse)	3:34
14.	"On My Way"	3:55

Green Version bonus tracks
No.	Title	Writer(s)	Length
15.	"Peace Pipe"	James Lowery; Eric Davie	3:38
16.	"Bang Yo Head"	Leonard Contreras	3:21
Total length:			53:41

Blue Version bonus tracks
No.	Title	Length
15.	"Hey Girl"	3:56
16.	"Mental Evaluation"	3:31
Total length:		54:04

Red Version bonus tracks
No.	Title	Length
15.	"Ghost of My EX"	3:59
16.	"Raven"	4:30
Total length:		55:06

== Personnel ==
- James "Anybody Killa" Lowery – main artist, lyricist, producer
- James "Young Wicked" Garcia – featured artist (track 6)
- Michael "Bonez Dubb" Garcia – featured artist (track 6)
- Chris "Blaze Ya Dead Homie" Rouleau – featured artist (track 9)
- Joseph "Violent J" Bruce – featured artist (track 13)
- Joseph "Shaggy 2 Dope" Utsler – featured artist (track 13), cuts
- Andrew Montessi – vocals
- Corporal Robinson – vocals
- DJ Fillin – vocals
- Jaime Brady – vocals
- Leah Stalker – vocals
- Michelle "Sweet Sugar Slam" Rapp – vocals
- Strict 9 – vocals
- DJ Clay – vocals, cuts
- Brian Kuma – vocals, programming, producer, mixing, engineering
- Eric Davie – vocals, programming, producer, engineering assistant
- Sam Blake – guitar
- Joey V – guitar
- Steven Razorblade – guitar
- Leonard Contreras – programming, producer
- Jim Kissling – mastering

== Charts ==
Chart (2010)	Peak position
US Billboard 200	117
US Top R&B/Hip-Hop Albums (Billboard)	18
US Top Rap Albums (Billboard)	12
US Independent Albums (Billboard)	15
