= Gang Rags =

Studio album by Blaze Ya Dead Homie
- Released: June 22, 2010
- Recorded: Funhouse Studio
- Genres: Gangsta rap; horrorcore; West Coast hip hop; G-funk
- Length: 51:04
- Label: Psychopathic Records
- Producers: Mike E. Clark, Violent J

Blaze Ya Dead Homie chronology
Clockwork Gray (2007)	Gang Rags (2010)	Gang Rags: Reborn (2014)

Gang Rags
- Outer cardboard box cover

Gang Rags is the fourth studio album by American rapper Blaze Ya Dead Homie. Released on June 22, 2010, it was produced by Mike E. Clark, and features appearances by guests Kottonmouth Kings, The Dayton Family, Anybody Killa and Insane Clown Posse. One of five different colored bandanas was included in the packaging of each album. Gang Rags debuted at number 52 on the Billboard 200.

== Concept ==
Blaze had been interested in the concept of bringing back the style of the late 1980s to mid 1990s for several years prior to the recording of Gang Rags. He thought that the best way to bring back "the old school [was] in the form of clothing. Gang rags [were] what it was all about back then." Blaze noted that "I may never be a designer or some shit, but I do know my music;" as such, he decided to use the name "Gang Rags" for his next album.

== Production ==
On December 24, 2009, Joseph Bruce revealed through his Twitter account that Gang Rags would be produced by Mike E. Clark. In April, Bruce announced that he would join Clark in producing the album, marking the first time that the two would collaborate on an album by Blaze. Gang Rags also marked the first time that the members of hip hop group Twiztid, Jamie Spaniolo and Paul Methric, did not provide any production on a Blaze album. Bruce and Clark helped Blaze develop new vocal styles, utilizing different voices and rhyme styles. Clark notes that they "tried to do a lot of different stuff on this record." Bruce adds that the album is "still very much Blaze, but ... the sounds and concepts around him have changed."

Bruce praised Clark's production on the album, saying that Clark "makes Blaze sound louder and stronger than he ever has," while Blaze added that Clark "is a genius at his craft. His ear is like no other." Clark attributed the success of the album to the group's ability to work well together. He described Gang Rags as "bangin’, bumpin’, crushin’ & ruthless!," while Blaze said that the album is "some straight dope Juggalo music."

== Music and lyrics ==
Gang Rags fuses late 1980s to early 1990s West Coast-based gangsta rap with darker lyrical content based in the horrorcore style.

- The song "Swine Flu" discusses crooked police officers.
- "Dub Sack" follows a drug dealer as he sells baggies of marijuana for 20 dollars apiece, known as dub sacks.
- On "Damn Bitch," Blaze and guests The Dayton Family praise the beauty and physical features of their female Juggalette fanbase.
- "Monster Inside" reveals the inner turmoil of a man while his sinister inner beast awaits to break free of its mortal shell. The song incorporates guitars in a way that Kik Axe Music reviewer James Zahn says "recalls early Cypress Hill".
- In "Party," Blaze and guest Anybody Killa speak about drinking, smoking, and constant partying without any worry of the consequences.
- The song "Lights Out" describes what life would be like if the sun never rose. Surrounded by total darkness, panic would arise, people would grow pale and cold, and "the moon would be the new sun."

== Release and promotion ==
The album's title was revealed by Psychopathic Records in December 2009. In promotion of the album, Bruce claimed that Gang Rags "will make a milestone in the career of the Dead Man, no doubt. This is the one. This is the album." The album's release was preceded with a nationwide in-store tour beginning in June, and followed by a 10-day tour. Gang Rags was released in five variant editions, each with its own colored bandana. Each colored bandana represented a fictional gang referenced in the album's lyrics: Red Rage (red), Redemption Ride (white), Zombie King (black), Dollar Domination (green) and Ice Cold Killers (blue).

The first music video from the album, "Dead Man Walking", was released on January 7, 2011. The second music video from the album, "Dub Sack", was released on December 7, 2012.

While on the 2011 Drive-By Tour, Blaze released Gang Rags Extended Version (Uncut + Uncensored), an alternate album recorded during the Gang Rag sessions. The tour-exclusive album features twelve songs originally recorded for Gang Rags. Gang Rags: Reborn, released October 21, 2014 on Majik Ninja Entertainment, derives from much of the same vocal sessions, but contains newly recorded, different music. The album was reissued in 2020 by Majik Ninja Entertainment for its 10th anniversary.

== Reception ==
Professional ratings
Review scores
Source	Rating
Allrovi	3.5/5 stars
Kik Axe Music	4.5/5 stars

Gang Rags debuted at number 5 on the Billboard Top Independent Albums chart and number 52 on the Billboard 200. Allrovi reviewer David Jeffries gave the album 3.5 out of 5 and praised its production and various musical styles. Jeffries wrote that "Blaze’s gruff delivery bounces off thumping basslines and speaker-ripping electro throughout the album," and that the "Parliament/Funkadelic-styled choruses ... [are] a welcome influence from the rapper and producer’s hometown of Detroit." The album was also favorably received by Kik Axe Music reviewer James Zahn, who called it "one of the best releases from Psychopathic in recent memory". Zahn praised the production of Mike E. Clark and Violent J, and said that the album "could easily break from the underground to attract outside attention."

== Track listing ==
All music is composed by Mike E. Clark.

No.	Title	Lyrics	Additional Information	Length
1.	"Suspect Loitering"		Additional vocals by Mike E. Clark	0:37
2.	"I'm Back"	Blaze Ya Dead Homie	Additional vocals by Mike E. Clark, Sugar Slam and Violent J	3:11
3.	"Swine Flu"	Violent J		2:51
4.	"Deadman Walking"	Violent J	Additional vocals by Mike E. Clark and Violent J	3:26
5.	"Ridin' the Whip" (featuring Kottonmouth Kings)	Blaze Ya Dead Homie; Kottonmouth Kings		3:34
6.	"Dub Sack"	Blaze Ya Dead Homie	Additional vocals by Axe Murder Boyz	3:41
7.	"B & E"	Blaze Ya Dead Homie	Additional vocals by Mike E. Clark and Violent J	4:11
8.	"Damn Bitch" (featuring The Dayton Family)	Blaze Ya Dead Homie; The Dayton Family		3:22
9.	"Monster Inside"	Blaze Ya Dead Homie	Additional vocals by Mike E. Clark and Violent J	3:28
10.	"Party" (performed by Drive-By)	Blaze Ya Dead Homie; Anybody Killa	Additional vocals by Mike E. Clark	3:39
11.	"Birthday" (featuring Insane Clown Posse)	Blaze Ya Dead Homie; Insane Clown Posse		4:01
12.	"Holy Shit"	Blaze Ya Dead Homie	Additional vocals by Violent J	3:35
13.	"Lights Out"	Violent J		3:38
14.	"3 Evil Wizards" (performed by Drive-By featuring Violent J)	Blaze Ya Dead Homie; Violent J Anybody Killa		4:15
15.	"Tokyo Spa"	Violent J	Additional vocals by Insane Clown Posse and Sugar Slam	3:41
Total length:				51:04

All music is composed by Mike E. Clark.

Gang Rags Extended Version (Uncut + Uncensored)
No.	Title	Length
1.	"Shits Fucked Up"	2:27
2.	"Napalm"	2:14
3.	"Give Em What They Want"	4:35
4.	"Ghetto Benefits" (featuring R.O.C. and J10)	4:16
5.	"Flavor Of The Week"	1:56
6.	"Ghost Bars"	3:45
7.	"Rock It Out (O.G. Version)"	4:49
8.	"Simply Fresh" (featuring J10)	2:37
9.	"Ten 40oz"	3:41
10.	"Rules 2 Tha Game" (featuring Anybody Killa)	3:04
11.	"Zombie King"	4:01
12.	"Lost & Found"	3:22
Total length:		39:45

== Personnel ==
=== Musicians ===
- Anybody Killa - vocals
- Axe Murder Boyz - vocals
- Blaze - vocals
- The Dayton Family - vocals
- Kottonmouth Kings - vocals
- Michelle Rapp - vocals
- Mike E. Clark - arranger, composer, vocals, producer, mixing
- Shaggy 2 Dope - vocals
- Violent J - composer, vocals, producer

=== Additional personnel ===
- E-Wolf - photography
- Jim Kissling - mastering
- Jim Neve - bandana design, cover design, layout

== Chart positions ==
Chart (2010)	Peak Position
Billboard 200	52
Top Independent Albums	5
Top R&B/Hip-Hop Albums	13
Top Rap Albums	9
