= Gods Hand =

Studio album by AMB
- Released: September 16, 2008
- Studios: One Room Studios (Denver, CO); C.S. Studios (Denver, CO)
- Length: 1:13:23
- Labels: Canonize; Hatchet House
- Producers: AMB; DJ Clay; Improv; Pray

AMB chronology
Blood In, Blood Out (2006)	Gods Hand (2008)	The Garcia Brothers (2014)

Gods Hand is the seventh studio album by the American hip-hop duo Axe Murder Boyz, released on September 16, 2008, by Hatchet House, a subsidiary of Psychopathic Records.

== Reception ==
Professional ratings
Review scores
Source	Rating
RapReviews	3.5/10

Steve "Flash" Juon, reviewing the album for RapReviews, panned Gods Hand, writing, "Despite my sincere efforts to see what God's Hand had to offer, I came to the conclusion that this album was obscure for a reason, and their on-again off-again relationship with Psychopathic wasn’t a coincidence. While the group may be big in the 303 area code (Denver) they love to reference, they feel like a big fish in a small pond who suddenly found themselves in an ocean full of sharks."

== Track listing ==
No.	Title	Writer(s)	Producer(s)	Length
1.	"Tears of Blood"		Pray; Axe Murder Boyz	1:09
2.	"Gods Hand Killers"	James Garcia; Mike Garcia	Young Wicked	3:02
3.	"Overcome"	J. Garcia; M. Garcia	Young Wicked	3:59
4.	"Regardless"	J. Garcia	Young Wicked	5:31
5.	"Redrum Where I'm From"	J. Garcia; M. Garcia	Young Wicked	3:03
6.	"Grindin'/???"	J. Garcia; M. Garcia	Young Wicked	3:46
7.	"Scrub Life"	J. Garcia; M. Garcia	Young Wicked	3:05
8.	"F.R.E.S.H."	J. Garcia; M. Garcia	Young Wicked	10:00
9.	"Underground Sorcerer"	J. Garcia; M. Garcia	Young Wicked	3:34
10.	"Apocolypse"	J. Garcia; M. Garcia	Young Wicked	3:44
11.	"Rose Garden"	J. Garcia; M. Garcia	Young Wicked	3:42
12.	"Canonize"	J. Garcia; M. Garcia	DJ Clay	2:46
13.	"Skeet"	J. Garcia; M. Garcia	Improv	2:24
14.	"Peace"	J. Garcia; M. Garcia	Young Wicked	3:57
15.	"Karmakazi" (featuring Pray)	J. Garcia; M. Garcia; Pray	Young Wicked; Pray	4:45
16.	"My Brothers Keeper" (featuring Big B and The Dirtball)	J. Garcia; M. Garcia; Bryan David Mahoney; David Alexander	Young Wicked	3:34
17.	"Heart Attack"	J. Garcia; M. Garcia	DJ Clay	3:02
18.	"I Stay Wicked"	J. Garcia; M. Garcia	Young Wicked	3:30
19.	"Lord Help Me"	J. Garcia; M. Garcia	Young Wicked	4:40
Total length:				1:13:23

== Personnel ==
- James "Otis/Young Wicked" Garcia – vocals (tracks: 2–19), producer (tracks: 1–11, 14–16, 18, 19)
- Mike "Bonez Dubb" Garcia – vocals (tracks: 2, 3, 5–19), producer (track 1)
- Pray – vocals (track 15), producer (tracks: 1, 15)
- Bryan "Big B" Mahoney – vocals (track 16)
- David "The Dirtball" Alexander – vocals (track 16)
- F.L.O.W.S. – additional vocals (tracks: 4, 8)
- Justin Malloy – additional vocals (tracks: 6–8)
- Danny Wasson – additional vocals (track 8)
- Knox Court – additional vocals (track 8)
- Matt Troxell – additional vocals (track 8)
- Head Chop – additional vocals (track 8)
- DJ Shogun – scratches (track 10)
- Michael "DJ Clay" Velasquez – producer (tracks: 12, 17)
- IMPROV – producer (track 13)
