= 1 Less G n da Hood =

- Cover of the original edition of the album

Studio album by Blaze Ya Dead Homie
- Released: October 16, 2001
- Studio: Lotus Pod (Farmington Hills, Michigan)
- Genres: Gangsta rap, West Coast hip hop, horrorcore
- Length: 52:08
- Label: Psychopathic Records
- Producers: Twiztid, Mike P., Fritz "The Cat" Van Kosky, Violent J

Blaze Ya Dead Homie chronology
1 Less G n da Hood (2001)	Colton Grundy: The Undying (2004)

1 Less G in the Hood: Deluxe G Edition
- 2006 reissue

Professional ratings
Review scores
Source	Rating
Allmusic	3/5 stars

1 Less G n da Hood is the debut studio album by American rapper Blaze Ya Dead Homie. Released on October 16, 2001, the album is his second release on the Psychopathic label, following his self-titled debut EP. 1 Less G n da Hood was produced by Twiztid, Mike Puwal, Fritz "the Cat" Van Kosky, and Violent J, and features appearances by guests Anybody Killa, Monoxide Child, Violent J, Jamie Madrox, and Shaggy 2 Dope.

== Reception ==
Allrovi wrote, "Combining the seriousness of a violent life in the ghetto with the juvenile antics of the Insane Clown Posse doesn't quite sound like a formula for success, but Detroit rapper and ICP affiliate Blaze somehow made it work".

== Reissue ==
In 2006, the album was reissued under the title 1 Less G in the Hood: Deluxe G Edition. The reissue contained material from Blaze's self-titled EP, the 2001 album, and three additional bonus tracks. The reissue also deleted the introduction "The Eulogy", which was replaced by the Blaze Ya Dead Homie EP intro, and the songs "Str8 Outta Detroit", "Here I Am" and "Hatchet Execution", which remain unavailable due to the fact that the original version of 1 Less G n da Hood is out of print and these tracks did not appear on any other albums.

1 Less G In The Hood: Deluxe G Edition peaked at #19 on the Billboard Top Heatseekers chart, #25 on the Top Independent Albums chart, and #86 on the Top R&B/Hip-Hop Albums chart.

== Legacy ==
The album is widely considered a "Juggalo Classic" as it was a big hit for Blaze with it being dubbed "Blaze's own "'The Great Milenko'".

In early June 2017 it was announced that Blaze Ya Dead Homie would be performing 1 Less G n da Hood in its entirety at Attack Of The Ninjas 2017 Afterparty.

== Track listing ==
Original
No.	Title	Lyrics	Producer(s)	Length
1.	"The Eulogy"			1:26
2.	"Grave Ain't No Place" (performed by Drive-By featuring Monoxide Child)	Drive-By; Monoxide Child	M. Puwal; Twiztid	4:41
3.	"Casket"	Blaze Ya Dead Homie; Power of the Pen	M. Puwal; Twiztid	2:46
4.	"Juggalo Anthem" (featuring Jamie Madrox)	Blaze Ya Dead Homie; Jamie Madrox	M. Puwal; Twiztid	3:30
5.	"Nasty"	Power of the Pen	M. Puwal; Twiztid; Violent J	3:08
6.	"Str8 Outta Detroit" (performed by Drive-By featuring Violent J)	Drive-By; Violent J		4:07
7.	"Maggot Face"	Blaze Ya Dead Homie	M. Puwal; Twiztid; Fritz "the Cat" Van Kosky	3:25
8.	"Here I am" (featuring Twiztid)			3:14
9.	"Hood Ratz" (performed by Drive-By)	Drive-By	M. Puwal; Twiztid; Chyna Dawl	3:38
10.	"Hatchet Luv"	Blaze Ya Dead Homie	M. Puwal	2:20
11.	"Saturday Afternoon" (featuring Jamie Madrox)	Blaze Ya Dead Homie; Jamie Madrox	M. Puwal; Twiztid; Fritz "the Cat" Van Kosky	4:14
12.	"Given Half a Chance" (performed by Dark Lotus)	Blaze Ya Dead Homie; Insane Clown Posse; Twiztid	M. Puwal; Fritz "the Cat" Van Kosky	3:54
13.	"U Can’t Hurt Me Now"	Power of the Pen	M. Puwal; Fritz "the Cat" Van Kosky	3:46
14.	"Thug 4 Life" (performed by Drive-By featuring Jamie Madrox)	Drive-By; Jamie Madrox	Fritz "the Cat" Van Kosky	3:38
15.	"Hatchet Execution" (featuring Twiztid, Insane Clown Posse)	Drive-By; Insane Clown Posse; Twiztid		6:31
Total length:				52:08

Deluxe G Edition
No.	Title	Lyrics	Producer(s)	Length
1.	"Intro 2 the Hood"		Fritz "the Cat" Van Kosky	1:40
2.	"Real G Shit"	Power of the Pen	Fritz "the Cat" Van Kosky; Twiztid	0:57
3.	"In Case U Forgot"	Power of the Pen	Fritz "the Cat" Van Kosky; Twiztid	2:26
4.	"I Go to Work"	Blaze Ya Dead Homie	Fritz "the Cat" Van Kosky; Twiztid	4:01
5.	"Put It Down"	Power of the Pen	Fritz "the Cat" Van Kosky; Twiztid	3:48
6.	"Grave Ain't No Place" (performed by Drive-By featuring Monoxide Child)	Drive-By; Monoxide Child	M. Puwal; Twiztid	3:58
7.	"Casket"	Blaze Ya Dead Homie; Power of the Pen	M. Puwal; Twiztid	2:48
8.	"Juggalo Anthem" (featuring Jamie Madrox)	Blaze Ya Dead Homie; Jamie Madrox	M. Puwal; Twiztid	3:26
9.	"Nasty"	Power of the Pen	M. Puwal; Twiztid; Violent J	3:11
10.	"Maggot Face"	Blaze Ya Dead Homie	M. Puwal; Twiztid; Fritz "the Cat" Van Kosky	3:56
11.	"Hood Ratz" (performed by Drive-By)	Drive-By; Chyna Dawl	M. Puwal; Twiztid; Fritz "the Cat" Van Kosky	3:18
12.	"Hatchet Luv"	Blaze Ya Dead Homie	M. Puwal	1:21
13.	"Saturday Afternoon" (featuring Jamie Madrox)	Blaze Ya Dead Homie; Jamie Madrox	M. Puwal; Twiztid; Fritz "the Cat" Van Kosky	4:14
14.	"Given Half a Chance" (performed by Dark Lotus)	Blaze Ya Dead Homie; Insane Clown Posse; Twiztid	M. Puwal; Fritz "the Cat" Van Kosky	3:55
15.	"U Can’t Hurt Me"	Power of the Pen	M. Puwal; Fritz "the Cat" Van Kosky	3:47
16.	"Thug 4 Life" (performed by Drive-By featuring Jamie Madrox)	Drive-By; Jamie Madrox	Fritz "the Cat" Van Kosky	3:49
17.	"Look Out" (featuring Lavel)	Blaze Ya Dead Homie; Lavel	Fritz "the Cat" Van Kosky	3:49
18.	"Mamma I Ain't Changed"	Power of the Pen	Fritz "the Cat" Van Kosky	2:26
19.	"Garbage"	Blaze Ya Dead Homie	Fritz "the Cat" Van Kosky	3:55
Total length:				60:43

== Personnel ==
- Blaze Ya Dead Homie – Vocals
- Anybody Killa – Performer
- Jamie Madrox – Vocals
- Monoxide – Performer
- Sabrina – Vocals
- Shaggy 2 Dope – Cut
- Jami Spittler – Graphic Design, Concept
- Twiztid – Producer
- Violent J – Vocals, Producer
- Eric "EWolf" Wheeler – Photography
- Chyna Dawl – Voicemail vocals

== Charts ==
=== Deluxe G Edition ===
Chart (2006)	Peak position
US Top Heatseekers	19
US Top Independent Albums	25
US Top R&B/Hip-Hop Albums	86
