= Colton Grundy: The Undying =

Colton Grundy

Studio album by Blaze Ya Dead Homie
- Released: October 19, 2004
- Genres: Gangsta rap, horrorcore, G-funk, hardcore hip hop, underground hip hop
- Length: 51:16
- Label: Psychopathic
- Producers: Fritz the Cat, Lavel, The R.O.C.

Blaze Ya Dead Homie chronology
1 Less G n da Hood (2001)	Colton Grundy (2004)	Clockwork Gray (2007)

Colton Grundy is the second studio album by American rapper Blaze Ya Dead Homie. The album was released on October 19, 2004. This album features Blaze rapping under his alternate persona, Colton Grundy, who he was credited as on some guest appearances elsewhere during this period; however, he is credited as Blaze in this album's liner notes.

== Music and lyrics ==
Allmusic described the music of Colton Grundy as "Snoop Dogg-esque mid-tempo G-funk matched with vintage monster-movie sound effects and heavy rock-style beats". The lyrics make reference to murder, intoxication, misogyny, gangsta rap themes and supernatural fantasy.

== Reception ==
Professional ratings
Review scores
Source	Rating
Allmusic	3/5 stars

Allmusic called the album "a frightening and rump-shaking addition to the ever-growing Psychopathic Records canon".

Colton Grundy peaked at #9 on the Billboard Top Heatseekers chart, #16 on the Top Independent Albums chart, #57 on the Top R&B/Hip-Hop Albums chart, #167 on the Top Internet Albums chart, and #167 on the Billboard 200. The track "Shotgun" was featured in the video game 25 To Life, which also featured music by Tupac Shakur, Public Enemy, DMX, Geto Boys and Tech N9ne.

== Track listing ==
No.	Title	Writer(s)	Producer(s)	Length
1.	"Bump This Shhh"	Jamie Spaniolo; Chris Rouleau	The R.O.C.	2:19
2.	"Touch of Death"	Jamie Spaniolo; Chris Rouleau	The R.O.C.	2:31
3.	"Shotgun" (performed by Drive-By featuring Esham & Jamie Madrox)	Jamie Spaniolo; Chris Rouleau; James Lowery; Rashaam Smith	Lavel	4:02
4.	"Etched Out"	Jamie Spaniolo; Chris Rouleau	Fritz "the Cat" Van Kosky	2:32
5.	"If I Fall" (featuring Jamie Madrox and Lavel)	Jamie Spaniolo; Chris Rouleau; Tha Shadow	Fritz "the Cat" Van Kosky	2:24
6.	"Hey You"	Jamie Spaniolo; Chris Rouleau	Butch	2:24
7.	"Out tha Gate"	Jamie Spaniolo; Chris Rouleau	Fritz "the Cat" Van Kosky	3:20
8.	"Stick Ya Hands Up" (performed by Drive-By)	Jamie Spaniolo; Chris Rouleau; James Lowery	Lavel	3:39
9.	"Further From Truth"	Jamie Spaniolo; Chris Rouleau	Fritz "the Cat" Van Kosky; Lavel; Chris Rouleau	3:16
10.	"Dayz in My Neighborhood"	Jamie Spaniolo; Chris Rouleau	Fritz "the Cat" Van Kosky	3:04
11.	"Roll It Up"	Jamie Spaniolo; Chris Rouleau	The R.O.C. Fritz "the Cat" Van Kosky	2:32
12.	"Mr. Deadfolx" (featuring Violent J)	Jamie Spaniolo; Chris Rouleau; Joseph Bruce	Butch; Fritz "the Cat" Van Kosky	4:18
13.	"2 Many Bitches" (performed by Drive-By featuring MC Breed)	Jamie Spaniolo; Chris Rouleau; James Lowery; Eric Breed	Fritz "the Cat" Van Kosky	3:53
14.	"Time Line"	Jamie Spaniolo; Chris Rouleau	Lavel	3:25
15.	"Climbing" (featuring Esham, Twiztid & Violent J)	Jamie Spaniolo; Chris Rouleau; Joseph Bruce; Paul Methric; Rashaam Smith	Fritz "the Cat" Van Kosky	7:42
Total length:				51:16

== Personnel ==
=== Vocals, Lyrics ===
- Blaze Ya Dead Homie
- Anybody Killa - (3, 8, 13)
- Esham - (3, 15)
- Lavel - (5)
- Violent J - (12, 15)
- Twiztid - (15)

=== Additional Vocals ===
- JD Tha Weed Man - (1)
- The R.O.C. - (1, 11)
- Lavel - (1, 4, 15)
- Jamie Madrox - (3, 12)
- Violent J - (3, 4, 8)
- Esham - (4)
- Somedumb Drunkbitch - (6)
- MC Breed - (13)
- Shaggy 2 Dope - (15)

=== Production (Produced by) ===
- The R.O.C. - (1, 2, 11)
- Lavel - (3, 8, 9, 14)
- Fritz The Cat - (4, 5, 7, 9, 10, 11, 12, 13, 15)
- Butch - (6, 12)
- Blaze Ya Dead Homie - (9)

=== Production (Engineered by) ===
- Scott Sumner - (1, 2, 3, 5, 14)
- Fritz The Cat - (4, 7, 10, 11, 12, 13, 15)
- Mike P. - (6)
- Lavel - (8)
- Violent J - (9)

=== Production (Additional Engineering by) ===
- Fritz The Cat - (1, 2, 8)
- Lavel - (3, 5, 14)

=== Production (Mixed by) ===
- Dr. Punch - (1, 3, 4, 6, 7, 8, 9, 11, 12, 13, 15)
- Systasyrosis Soundsquad - (2, 14)
- Fritz The Cat - (5, 10)
- Blaze Ya Dead Homie - (10)
- Lavel - (10)

== Charts ==
Chart (2004)	Peak position
US Billboard 200	167
US Top R&B Albums	57
US Top Heatseekers	9
US Top Independent Albums	16
US Top Internet Albums	167
