= The Garcia Brothers (album) =

Studio album by Axe Murder Boyz
- Released: March 25, 2014
- Recorded: 2011–2014
- Labels: Canonize; Psychopathic
- Producer: Young Wicked

Axe Murder Boyz chronology
Gods Hand (2008)	The Garcia Brothers (2014)	Muerte (2018)

The Garcia Brothers is the eighth studio album by the American hip-hop duo Axe Murder Boyz, released on March 25, 2014, by Psychopathic Records.

== Track listing ==
All music is composed by Otis.

The Garcia Brothers
No.	Title	Writer(s)	Length
1.	"Intro"	Axe Murder Boyz	1:13
2.	"Us Against The World"	Axe Murder Boyz	4:01
3.	"M.O.E."	Axe Murder Boyz	2:59
4.	"I Get Even"	Axe Murder Boyz	3:21
5.	"Smoke Kush"	Axe Murder Boyz	3:06
6.	"Might Go Mad (ft. Insane Clown Posse)"	Axe Murder Boyz, Insane Clown Posse	4:20
7.	"Roaches"	Axe Murder Boyz	3:02
8.	"Shine"	Axe Murder Boyz	4:01
9.	"Bleed (ft. Anybody Killa)"	Axe Murder Boyz, Anybody Killa	4:47
10.	"No Trust"	Axe Murder Boyz	3:47
11.	"I Keeps It Movin'"	Axe Murder Boyz	3:02
12.	"Listen (ft. Big Hoodoo)"	Axe Murder Boyz, Big Hoodoo	4:01
13.	"Runaway"	Axe Murder Boyz	4:32
14.	"Nobody Get Hurt"	Axe Murder Boyz	4:48

== Personnel ==
- Otis – vocals, production
- Bonez Dubb – vocals
- Insane Clown Posse (Violent J & Shaggy 2 Dope) – guest verse on "Might Go Mad"
- Anybody Killa – guest verse on "Bleed"
- Big Hoodoo – guest verse on "Listen"
- Dave Gacey - cover artist

== Charts ==
Chart (2014)	Peak position
US Heatseekers	24
