= Dirty History =

Studio album by Anybody Killa
- Released: July 27, 2004
- Recorded: 2003–04
- Genre: Native American hip hop; underground hip hop
- Length: 53:11
- Label: Psychopathic
- Producer: Esham; Fritz The Cat; Lavel; Mike Puwal; The R.O.C.; Anybody Killa (co.); Violent J (co.)

Anybody Killa chronology
Hatchet Warrior (2003)	Dirty History (2004)	Mudface (2008)

Professional ratings
Review scores
Source	Rating
AllMusic	3/5 stars

Dirty History is the third solo studio album by American rapper Anybody Killa. It was released on July 27, 2004, via Psychopathic Records. Production was handled by Fritz the Cat, Lavel, Mike Puwal, Esham and The R.O.C., with co-production by Violent J and ABK himself. It features guest appearances from Insane Clown Posse, Blaze Ya Dead Homie, Twiztid and Lavel.

The album peaked at No. 152 on the Billboard 200, No. 53 on the Top R&B/Hip-Hop Albums, No. 10 on the Independent Albums and No. 7 on the Heatseekers Albums in the United States.

A music video was directed for the promotional single "Hey Y'all".

== Track listing ==
No.	Title	Writer(s)	Producer(s)	Length
1.	"Intro" (featuring Lavel)	James Lowery	Lavel; ABK^{[c]}	1:22
2.	"Bombs on You"	Lowery; Fritz Van Kosky	Fritz the Cat; ABK^{[c]}; Violent J^{[c]}	2:13
3.	"Stick and Move"	Lowery; Michael J. Puwal	Mike P.; ABK^{[c]}; Violent J^{[c]}	2:53
4.	"Down Here" (featuring Violent J)	Lowery; Joseph Bruce; Van Kosky	Fritz the Cat; Violent J^{[c]}	4:00
5.	"Gimme Ah Beat"	Lowery	ABK^{[c]}; Violent J^{[c]}	2:15
6.	"Party at the Liquor Store" (featuring Colton Grundy)	Lowery; Chris Rouleau; Van Kosky	Fritz the Cat; ABK^{[c]}; Violent J^{[c]}	3:05
7.	"Hey Y'all"	Lowery; Bryan Jones	The R.O.C.; ABK^{[c]}; Violent J^{[c]}	2:55
8.	"Retaliate" (featuring Twiztid)	Lowery; James Spaniolo; Paul Methric; James Hicks	Lavel; ABK^{[c]}; Violent J^{[c]}	3:09
9.	"Trees and Woods"	Lowery; Van Kosky	Fritz the Cat; ABK^{[c]}; Violent J^{[c]}	4:18
10.	"Nevehoe" (featuring Shaggy 2 Dope)	Lowery; Joseph Utsler; Van Kosky	Fritz the Cat; ABK^{[c]}; Violent J^{[c]}	3:39
11.	"Laugh at You"	Lowery; Hicks	Lavel; ABK^{[c]}; Violent J^{[c]}	2:59
12.	"It Doesn't Matta" (featuring Colton Grundy)	Lowery; Rouleau; Esham Smith	Esham; ABK^{[c]}; Violent J^{[c]}	3:47
13.	"Oh No"	Lowery; Van Kosky; Hicks	Fritz the Cat; Lavel; ABK^{[c]}; Violent J^{[c]}	4:56
14.	"Charlie Brown" (featuring Violent J)	Lowery; Bruce; Van Kosky	Fritz the Cat; ABK^{[c]}; Violent J^{[c]}	2:09
15.	"Put My Life on It"	Lowery; Van Kosky	Fritz the Cat; ABK^{[c]}; Violent J^{[c]}	2:16
16.	"Can't Help It"	Lowery; Van Kosky	Fritz the Cat; ABK^{[c]}; Violent J^{[c]}	3:25
17.	"2 Whom This May Concern"	Lowery; Puwal	Mike P.; ABK^{[c]}; Violent J^{[c]}	3:50
Total length:				53:11

Notes

- ^{^[c]} signifies a co-producer.

== Personnel ==
- James "Anybody Killa" Lowery – main artist, rap vocals (tracks: 2–17), additional vocals (track 1), beatboxing (track 5), co-producer (tracks: 1–3, 5–17)
- Joseph "Violent J" Bruce – featured artist, rap vocals (tracks: 4, 14), additional vocals (tracks: 6, 7, 13, 15), co-producer (tracks: 2–17)
- Chris "Blaze Ya Dead Homie" Rouleau – featured artist, rap vocals (tracks: 6, 12)
- James "Jamie Madrox" Spaniolo – featured artist, rap vocals (track 8), additional vocals (track 6)
- Paul "Monoxide" Methric – featured artist, rap vocals (track 8), additional vocals (track 6)
- Joseph "Shaggy 2 Dope" Utsler – featured artist, rap vocals (track 10), scratches (tracks: 3, 5, 8)
- James "Lavel" Hicks – vocals (track 1), additional vocals (tracks: 6, 13, 16), programming (tracks: 1, 8, 15), engineering (tracks: 1, 10, 15), producer (tracks: 1, 8, 11, 13)
- Esham Smith – additional vocals (tracks: 1, 12), scratches (track 2), programming & producer (track 12)
- Ry-Ry – additional vocals (track 1)
- Syn of Zug Izland – additional vocals (tracks: 3, 7)
- Michelle "Sugar Slam" Rapp – additional vocals (track 11)
- Sabrina – additional vocals (track 17)
- Michael Puwal – keyboards (track 5), programming (tracks: 3, 5, 7, 11, 17), engineering (tracks: 3, 5, 7, 11, 12), producer (tracks: 3, 17)
- Fritz "The Cat" Van Kosky – programming (tracks: 2, 4, 6, 9, 10, 13, 14, 16, 17), engineering (tracks: 2, 4, 6, 8, 9, 13, 14), producer (tracks: 2, 4, 6, 9, 10, 13–16)
- Bryan "The R.O.C." Jones – producer (track 7)
- Michael Scotta – illustrations, layout design
- Bob Alford – photography

== Charts ==
Chart (2004)	Peak position
US Billboard 200	152
US Top R&B/Hip-Hop Albums (Billboard)	53
US Independent Albums (Billboard)	10
US Heatseekers Albums (Billboard)	7
