= Clockwork Gray =

Studio album by Blaze Ya Dead Homie
- Released: August 21, 2007
- Studio: The Lotus Pod Recording Studio; Audio Magic
- Genre: Gangsta rap; horrorcore
- Length: 49:43
- Label: Psychopathic
- Producer: Butch; DJ Clay; Fritz The Cat; Lost Koast Productions; Randy Lynch; Scott Sumner; Shaggy 2 Dope; The R.O.C.

Blaze Ya Dead Homie chronology
Colton Grundy: The Undying (2004)	Clockwork Gray (2007)	Gang Rags (2010)

Professional ratings
Review scores
Source	Rating
AllMusic	3/5 stars

Clockwork Gray is the third studio album by American rapper Blaze Ya Dead Homie. It was released on August 21, 2007, through Psychopathic Records. Recording sessions took place at the Lotus Pod Recording Studio and at Audio Magic. Production was handled by Lost Koast Productions, Scott Sumner, Fritz The Cat, Randy Lynch, The R.O.C., Butch, DJ Clay and Shaggy 2 Dope. It features guest appearances from The R.O.C., Twiztid, Big B, Boondox, Defekt, Kutt Calhoun and Violent J. The album debuted at number 100 on the Billboard 200, number 34 on the Top R&B/Hip-Hop Albums, number 16 on the Top Rap Albums and number 14 on the Independent Albums charts in the United States.

== Track listing ==
No.	Title	Writer(s)	Producer(s)	Length
1.	"Contact From the Other Side" (performed by Defekt)	MoMad Publishing Ltd.	Fritz The Cat	1:14
2.	"The Crypt Keeper"	MoMad Publishing Ltd.	Lost Koast Productions	2:00
3.	"Blaze Up"	MoMad Publishing Ltd.	Lost Koast Productions	2:56
4.	"Toe Tagz 'N Body Bagz" (featuring Jamie Madrox)	Chris Rouleau; Jamie Spaniolo	Lost Koast Productions	3:08
5.	"Ill Connect" (featuring The R.O.C.)	Rouleau; Bryan Jones	Shaggy 2 Dope	3:02
6.	"Keep It Simple" (featuring Big B and Kutt Calhoun)	Rouleau; Bryan Mahoney; Melvin Calhoun Jr.	Lost Koast Productions	4:11
7.	"Some of Them Thugz" (featuring Monoxide Child)	Rouleau; Paul Methric	Lost Koast Productions	2:16
8.	"Egg Plantz"	MoMad Publishing Ltd.	Scott Sumner; Randy Lynch	3:45
9.	"Zip Codez N' Time Zone" (featuring Violent J)	Rouleau; Joseph Bruce	DJ Clay	4:39
10.	"Inside Looking Out" (featuring The R.O.C. and Twiztid)	Rouleau; Jones; Spaniolo; Methric	The R.O.C.	3:28
11.	"Dead Neck" (featuring Boondox)	Rouleau; David Hutto	Scott Sumner	3:19
12.	"Escape Artist"	MoMad Publishing Ltd.	Scott Sumner; Randy Lynch	4:56
13.	"Wishing Well" (featuring Jamie Madrox)	Rouleau; Spaniolo	Butch; Fritz The Cat	4:26
14.	"E.O.D." (featuring The R.O.C.)	Rouleau; Jones	The R.O.C.	6:28
Total length:				49:43

== Personnel ==
- Chris "Blaze Ya Dead Homie" Rouleau — vocals
- Steve "Defekt" Selley — vocals (track 1)
- Jamie "Madrox" Spaniolo — additional vocals (tracks: 2, 6, 7, 11, 12), vocals (tracks: 4, 10, 13)
- Bryan "The R.O.C." Jones — additional vocals (tracks: 3, 8, 11, 13), vocals (tracks: 5, 10, 14), producer (tracks: 10, 14)
- Bryan "Big B" Mahoney — vocals (track 6)
- Melvin "Kutt Calhoun" Calhoun Jr. — vocals (track 6)
- Paul "Monoxide Child" Methric — vocals (tracks: 7, 10)
- Joseph "Violent J" Bruce — vocals (track 9)
- David "Boondox" Hutto — vocals (track 11)
- Fritz "The Cat" Van Kosky — producer (tracks: 1, 13), mixing (tracks: 6, 13, 14)
- Lost Koast Productions — producer (tracks: 2–4, 6, 7)
- Joseph "Shaggy 2 Dope" Utsler — producer (track 5)
- Scott Sumner — producer (tracks: 8, 11, 12), mixing (tracks: 2–4, 7, 8, 10–12)
- Randy Lynch — producer (tracks: 8, 12)
- Michael "DJ Clay" Velasquez — producer (track 9)
- Brian Kuma — arranger (tracks: 1, 5), mixing (tracks: 1, 5, 9)
- EvenFX — cover design, layout

== Charts ==
Chart (2007)	Peak position
US Billboard 200	100
US Top R&B/Hip-Hop Albums (Billboard)	34
US Top Rap Albums (Billboard)	16
US Independent Albums (Billboard)	14
