= Mudface (Anybody Killa album) =

Studio album by Anybody Killa
- Released: November 25, 2008
- Recorded: 2007–2008
- Studio: The Lotus Pod; Native World Studios; The Haunted Cabin Studios; Starlight Studios
- Genre: Hip hop
- Length: 59:09
- Label: Psychopathic
- Producer: Anybody Killa; Eric Davie; Leonard Contreras; Mitch E. Mitch; Native Spirits

Anybody Killa chronology
Dirty History (2004)	Mudface (2008)	Medicine Bag (2010)

Mudface is the fourth studio album by American rapper Anybody Killa. It was released on November 25, 2008, through Psychopathic Records. Recording sessions took place at The Lotus Pod, Native World Studios, The Haunted Cabin Studios and Starlight Studios. Production was handled by Leonard Contreras, Eric Davie, Mitch E. Mitch, Native Spirits, and ABK himself. It features guest appearances from Blaze Ya Dead Homie, Boondox, Insane Clown Posse and Strict 9. The album did not reach the Billboard 200, however, it peaked at No. 15 on the Top Rap Albums and No. 43 on the Independent Albums in the United States.

== Track listing ==
Track listing information is adapted from AllMusic, Discogs, and CD booklet.

No.	Title	Writer(s)	Producer(s)	Length
1.	"The Vision"	Jamie Lowery	Mitch E. Mitch	2:32
2.	"Far from Reality"	Lowery	Leonard Contreras	2:50
3.	"Muddy Muddy"	Lowery	Native Spirits	2:28
4.	"Grind 2 the Flow"	Lowery	ABK; Eric Davie^{[c]}	2:49
5.	"My Neighborhood" (featuring Boondox)	Lowery; David Hutto	Eric Davie	3:34
6.	"Mommy's Doin' Drugs"	Lowery	Leonard Contreras	3:18
7.	"What U Want from Me" (featuring Blaze Ya Dead Homie)	Lowery; Chris Rouleau	ABK	3:01
8.	"Rain Dance"	Lowery	Leonard Contreras	4:12
9.	"Attitude"	Lowery	ABK; Leonard Contreras^{[c]}; Mitch E. Mitch^{[c]}	3:20
10.	"Thoughts of Suicide" (featuring Strict 9)	Lowery; Strict 9	Leonard Contreras	3:29
11.	"Im Just Me"	Lowery	Leonard Contreras	3:31
12.	"Let Them Outside"	Lowery	Leonard Contreras	4:13
13.	"Trails of Tears"	Lowery	Leonard Contreras	5:03
14.	"U Aint No Killa" (featuring Insane Clown Posse)	Lowery; Joseph Bruce; Joseph Utsler	Eric Davie	3:23
15.	"Same Thing 2"	Lowery	Eric Davie	3:33
16.	"Racist"	Lowery	Eric Davie	4:20
17.	"Keep It Real"	Lowery	ABK; Leonard Contreras^{[c]}; Mitch E. Mitch^{[c]}	3:33
Total length:				59:09

Notes

- ^{^[c]} signifies a co-producer.

== Personnel ==
Credits are adapted from AllMusic, Discogs, and CD booklet.

- James "Anybody Killa" Lowery – vocals, producer (tracks: 4, 7, 9, 17), mixing
- David "Boondox" Hutto – vocals (track 5)
- Strict 9 – vocals (track 10), additional vocals (tracks: 5, 12, 14, 17)
- Christopher "Blaze Ya Dead Homie" Rouleau – vocals (track 7)
- Joseph "Violent J" Bruce – vocals (track 14), additional vocals (track 15)
- Joseph "Shaggy 2 Dope" Utsler – vocals (track 14)
- Tina Mastrianni – additional vocals (tracks: 5, 6, 10, 12, 13, 17)
- Eric Davie – additional vocals (tracks: 5, 15), producer (tracks: 5, 14–16), co-producer (track 4), engineering (tracks: 1, 2, 4–6, 8, 10, 12, 14–17), mixing
- Venomiz – additional vocals (track 14)
- Mitch E. Mitch – guitar (track 7), producer (track 1), co-producer (tracks: 9, 17)
- DJ Fill-In – scratches (tracks: 4, 14, 16)
- Leonard Contreras – producer (tracks: 2, 6, 8, 10–13), co-producer (tracks: 9, 17)
- Native Spirits – producer (track 3), engineering (tracks: 3, 7, 9, 11)
- Lorne Loulas – engineering (tracks: 6, 12, 13, 17)
- Dr. Punch – mixing (tracks: 7, 14, 15)
- Jeff Campo – mastering

== Charts ==
Chart (2008)	Peak position
US Top Rap Albums (Billboard)	15
US Independent Albums (Billboard)	43
