= Blood In, Blood Out (Axe Murder Boyz album) =

Blood In Blood Out

Studio album by AMB
- Released: April 18, 2006
- Recorded: 2005–2006
- Studios: The Lotus Pod (Detroit, MI); The Funhouse Studio (Detroit, MI)
- Genres: Horrorcore; rap rock
- Length: 50:17
- Label: Psychopathic
- Producers: AMB; Blaze; Twiztid

Axe Murder Boyz chronology
The Unforgiven Forest (2004)	Blood In Blood Out (2006)	Gods Hand (2008)

Blood In Blood Out is the sixth studio album by the American hip-hop duo Axe Murder Boyz, released on April 18, 2006, by Psychopathic Records.

== Reception ==
Professional ratings
Review scores
Source	Rating
AllMusic	(favorable)

Blood In Blood Out charted at number 199 on the Billboard 200.

AllMusic's reviewer found it appealing, writing: "packed with thumping beats, dark, ominous samples, and raps full of cartoonish violence, AMB prove they are well on their way out of the underground and into the national limelight".

== Track listing ==
No.	Title	Lyrics	Music	Producer(s)	Length
1.	"Blood In"	James Garcia; Mike Garcia		Axe Murder Boyz	0:54
2.	"Heatseeker"	J. Garcia; M. Garcia	Mike E. Clark	Axe Murder Boyz	2:25
3.	"Selfish"	J. Garcia; M. Garcia	Brian Kuma	Axe Murder Boyz	2:48
4.	"Scream My Name"	J. Garcia; M. Garcia	Shaggy 2 Dope; Mike E. Clark	Axe Murder Boyz	3:02
5.	"West Side Wicked"	J. Garcia; M. Garcia	Fritz The Cat	Axe Murder Boyz	3:33
6.	"God Only Knows"	J. Garcia; M. Garcia	Mike E. Clark	Axe Murder Boyz	2:49
7.	"Takin' It Away"	J. Garcia; M. Garcia	Dr. Punch	Axe Murder Boyz	3:46
8.	"Old Girl (All Mine)"	J. Garcia; M. Garcia	Mike E. Clark	Axe Murder Boyz	3:41
9.	"All Day" (featuring Twiztid)	J. Garcia; M. Garcia; Jamie Spaniolo; Paul Methric	Fritz The Cat	Axe Murder Boyz; Twiztid	3:32
10.	"Chips 'N' Dip"	J. Garcia; M. Garcia	Polar Bear	Axe Murder Boyz	3:08
11.	"Still Alive"	J. Garcia; M. Garcia	Mike E. Clark	Axe Murder Boyz	3:00
12.	"Calm Down" (featuring Insane Clown Posse)	J. Garcia; M. Garcia	Mike E. Clark	Axe Murder Boyz	5:29
13.	"Right Now"	J. Garcia; M. Garcia	Polar Bear	Axe Murder Boyz	3:14
14.	"See Thru" (featuring Blaze Ya Dead Homie)	J. Garcia; M. Garcia; Christopher Rouleau	Mike E. Clark; Dr. Punch	Axe Murder Boyz; Blaze Ya Dead Homie	3:23
15.	"Honor"	J. Garcia; M. Garcia	Mike E. Clark	Axe Murder Boyz	4:05
16.	"Blood Out"	J. Garcia; M. Garcia		Axe Murder Boyz	1:28
Total length:					50:17

== Personnel ==
- James "Otis/Young Wicked" Garcia – vocals, producer
- Mike "Bonez Dubb" Garcia – vocals, producer
- Joseph "Shaggy 2 Dope" Utsler – additional vocals (tracks: 2, 12), scratches (tracks: 2, 5), composer (track 4)
- Joseph "Dr. Punch" Bruce – additional vocals (tracks: 2, 12), composer (tracks: 7, 14), engineering (tracks: 1–14, 16), mixing (track 14)
- Jamie "Madrox" Spaniolo – vocals & producer (track 9)
- Paul "Monoxide Child" Methric – vocals & producer (track 9)
- Chris "Blaze Ya Dead Homie" Rouleau – vocals & producer (track 14)
- Mike E. Clark – composer (tracks: 2, 4, 6, 8, 11, 12, 14, 15), engineering (tracks: 4, 8, 14, 15), mixing (track 15)
- Brian "Kuma" Bukantis II – composer (track 3), engineering (tracks: 1–3, 5–7, 10–14, 16), mixing (tracks: 2, 3, 6, 7, 10, 11, 13, 14)
- Fritz "The Cat" Van Kosky – composer (tracks: 5, 9), engineering (tracks: 4, 5, 9, 10), mixing (tracks: 1, 4, 5, 8, 9, 12, 16)
- Polar Bear – composer (tracks: 10, 13)
- Eric Davie – engineering (tracks: 4, 8, 14, 15)

== Charts ==
Chart (2006)	Peak position
US Billboard 200	199
US Independent Albums (Billboard)	22
US Heatseekers Albums (Billboard)	11
