= Native American hip-hop =

Music genre or scene

Native American hip hop is hip hop culture practiced by people of (often urban) Native American heritage, including Canadian First Nation hip hop artists. It is not a specific form of hip hop but varies in style along the lines of hip hop in general. Native Americans have been present in hip hop culture since its inception as breakdancers, DJs, rappers, and graffiti artists. The Native American contribution to hip hop can occasionally be veiled by the ethnic umbrella term of Hispanic or Latino, terms that may refer to Native Americans in certain contexts.

Hip hop has grown in popularity not only in urban settings but also in reservations since it has become ubiquitous on television and radio. Political activism and its expression in art have been of great influence due to many social issues present in indigenous communities. Artists such as John Trudell (with his spoken word poetry) and Russell Means (with what he calls his rap-ajo music) have been some of influences with their artistic endeavors.

== Notable artists ==
Melle Mel, the first rapper to ever use the epithet MC, is Cherokee and Ernie Paniccioli, a photographer of hip hop culture who grew up in Brooklyn, is Cree. Funkdoobiest, Solé, and Litefoot (winner of the Native American Music Award), are also well-known Native American hip hop artists. Wu-Tang affiliate King Just is also Native American and the Ol' Dirty Bastard also claimed to be of Native American descent. Flavor Unit member Apache has also been assumed to be Native American, though a reliable source has yet to be found. In the past, the majority of Native American hip hop was to be found in the underground scene, rarely gaining exposure beyond regional hits. However, artists such as Drezus, Frank Waln, Lil' Cory, Supaman, DJ oTTo and Red Eagle are just a few newer artists that have gained substantial popularity in recent years.

Some Indigenous artists worry that their blend of traditional music with their own may be seen as disrespectful to their ancestors. However, many elders and hip hop listeners are able to appreciate the mixture, as it can bring multiple generations together through music.

Hatchet Warrior, the second album by Native American hip hop artist Anybody Killa, was released in 2003, and peaked at #4 on the Billboard Top Independent Albums chart, #42 on the Top R&B/Hip-Hop Albums chart, and #98 on the Billboard 200.

The organization Beat Nation is a Canadian not-for-profit Indigenous hip hop collective with the goal of giving public space to Indigenous artists and their listeners. It is run through a website and exhibits which aim to share Beat Nation's work and music, as well as give space for Indigenous hip hop culture to operate.

Rapper Young Kidd from Winnipeg, Manitoba is of Jamaican and Aboriginal heritage, and two of the trio group, Winnipeg's Most, are Aboriginal – Jon C and Brooklyn. Winnipeg's Most have won several Aboriginal Peoples Choice Music Awards. Both Young Kidd and Winnipeg's Most have achieved high levels of local success in Winnipeg.

Florida rapper Denzel Curry, a pioneer of the Cloud Rap and SoundCloud Rap scene, is of Bahamian and Native American heritage.

== Early Internet pioneering ==
Early efforts to spread Native hip hop online were made by redhiphop.com and nativehiphop.net.

Redhiphip.com began as early as August, 2000, was started by Derek Edenshaw (aka Manik 1derful), a Haida and Cree emcee and spokesperson for the Native Youth Movement.

Nativehiphop.net began as a geocities page as early as October 2000. and adopted its own URL by April 2001. It was created by Junior Simpson, and published submissions from various artists and members of the public, offering website links, artist reviews, and MP3 downloads, and supported networking between Indigenous North American hip hop artists and groups. Examples include Shadowyze, Atzlan Underground, Anishinaabe Posse, Gary Davis, Manik, Natay, 7th Generation, Red Power Squad, Quese The Emcee, Night Shield, Reddnation, Rollin Fox, Supaman, King Blizz, and War Party.

== See also ==
- Canadian hip-hop#Indigenous hip hop
- Mike Bone – Indigenous HipHop Group
