= Axe Murder Boyz =

American hip-hop group

- Also known as: AMB
- Origin: Denver, Colorado, U.S.
- Genre: Horrorcore
- Years active: 1999–present
- Labels: Majik Ninja; Hatchet House; Psychopathic; Canonize; Axe
- Members: Mike Garcia; James Garcia
- Website: AxeMurderBoyz.com

Axe Murder Boyz, also known as AMB, is an American hip-hop duo formed in Denver, Colorado, in 1999. Known for their gangsta rap-influenced horrorcore style, they gained prominence after signing with Psychopathic Records, where they released their sixth studio album, Blood In, Blood Out in 2006. They later signed with Majik Ninja Entertainment.

== History ==
Mexican-American brothers Mike and James Garcia formed AMB in 1999 in Denver, Colorado, releasing The Underground Stylistikz (1999), Tormented (2000), The Galaxy (2001), The Down Low EP (2002), and Tha Underground Stylystiks Compilation Album, Vol. 1 (2003) on the independent label Axe Recordings, before signing with Canonize Productions to release their fifth studio album, The Unforgiven Forest (2004), along with the EPs Vampirez and Underdogz. After winning a contest held by Insane Clown Posse's Psychopathic Records, AMB was offered a recording contract with the label, who released their sixth studio album, Blood In, Blood Out (2006). Featuring appearances by ICP, Twiztid and Blaze Ya Dead Homie, the album charted on the Billboard Heatseekers, Independent, and Internet charts, coming in at number 199 on the overall album chart. The follow-up album, Gods Hand (2008), was released on the Psychopathic subsidiary Hatchet House. They briefly returned to Psychopathic, releasing The Garcia Brothers (2014), before leaving for Twiztid's label Majik Ninja Entertainment to release Muerte (2018).

== Style ==
In the site's review of Blood In, Blood Out, AllMusic said that AMB "share a theatrical, horrorcore, rap-rock aesthetic with the likes of Insane Clown Posse and Twiztid". They "injected some of the creepy horror and cartoonish violence associated with [the] horrorcore labels [Psychopathic, Hatchet House and Majik Ninja] with their own hardcore, West Coast gangsta rap-influenced stylings", according to Neil Z. Yeung. Their music contains "thumping beats [and] dark, ominous samples". Reviewing Gods Hand for RapReviews, Steve "Flash" Juon said, "What's stranger about God's Hand is how often they seem to be running from the very genre they're associated with. At some point I began to wonder if I was listening to a Christian rap group instead of a Psychopathic Records one. The album's name could have been a subtle message implying that evil is engineered by a higher power to test humanity's faith. Instead it often feels like the Garcia twins are actually trying to convert people TO faith, throwing in bars about how their Lord and savior will great them on the day of judgment. This makes attempts their attempts to subvert their own narrative on songs like 'Peace' even more odd. They try to use the word as a double entendre on the hook but the moment I hear the words 'the lesson that I teach' I know there’s a small Bible in their back pockets."

== Discography ==
- Underground Stylistikz (1999)
- Tormented (2000)
- The Galaxy (2001)
- The Down Low EP (2002)
- Tha Underground Stylystiks Compilation Album, Vol. 1 (2003)
- The Unforgiven Forest (2004)
- Blood In, Blood Out (2006)
- Gods Hand (2008)
- Strictly 4 The Scrubs: The Mixtape (2011)
- The Garcia Brothers (2014)
- Muerte (2018)
