= Anybody Killa =

American rapper (born 1973)

- Also known as: Jaymo; Native Funk; ABK; Hatchet Warrior; Sawed Off
- Born: James Clemmie Lowery; June 26, 1974 (age 52)
- Origin: Detroit, Michigan, United States
- Genres: Native American hip hop
- Occupation: Rapper
- Years active: 1994–present
- Labels: Native World Inc.; Ear Drug Musik; Psychopathic; Slangtown
- Member of: Drive-By; Tha Hav Knots; Eastside Ninjas; D4L
- Formerly of: Dark Lotus; Psychopathic Rydas

James Clemmie Lowery (born June 26, 1974), also known as Anybody Killa, or ABK, is an American rapper from Detroit, Michigan, United States, whose stage persona is that of a Native American warrior. He was signed to Psychopathic Records, but is now under his own label Native World Inc. Prior to performing as ABK he performed as Native Funk.

== Early years (1980s) ==
Lowery was raised on the east side of Detroit. His parents were from Pembroke, North Carolina. Lowery's father was a preacher. His aunt and mother taught him about Native American heritage, telling him Cherokee and Lumbee legends and teaching him about dreamcatchers. Lowery started making music at a young age, using anything he could find as instruments, and began writing his own songs at the age of 13. By the age of 15, local kids were paying to watch him perform in his garage.

== Krazy Klan (1995) ==
In 1995, he formed the group Krazy Klan with childhood friend Lavel, performing as Jaymo and J-ho, respectively. During this period, Lowery worked at a side plant that produced parts for Chrysler. His middle finger was partially cut off in an accident. After releasing two albums independently and performing at local clubs and parties, Krazy Klan broke up.

== Slangtown Records and Native Funk (2000) ==
Seeking a solo career under the stage name "Native Funk," Lowery released his first solo album, Rain from the Sun. After being introduced to rapper Chris Rouleau, known professionally as "Blaze Ya Dead Homie," Lowery adopted the stage name "Anybody Killa," and the two toured as the opening act for Insane Clown Posse and Twiztid. They also created the group Drive-By, and released their first single, "Foodang".

== Hatchet Warrior era (2003) ==
Lowery signed to Psychopathic Records, and recorded his second album, Hatchet Warrior, released on April 8, 2003. It peaked at #4 on the Billboard Top Independent Albums chart, #42 on the Top R&B/Hip-Hop Albums chart, and #98 on the Billboard 200. Allmusic reviewer Johnny Loftus wrote that "Mostly, Hatchet Warrior is a rehash of [Psychopathic Records] mystique. References to Faygo abound and shout-outs to Detroit and the Juggalos are frequent, while much of ABK et al.'s raps are workmanlike run-throughs of familiar themes".

== Dirty History era (2004) ==
On July 27, 2004, Lowery released his third album, Dirty History. It peaked at #7 on the Top Heatseekers chart, #10 on the Top Independent Albums, #53 on the Top R&B/Hip-Hop Albums, and #152 on the Billboard 200. Lowery also joined the groups Dark Lotus and Psychopathic Rydas, performing in the latter as "Sawed Off." Lowery and Rouleau also formed the group Drive-By.

== Road Fools EP era (2005) ==
The EP Road Fools, released on March 22, 2005, peaked at #23 on the Top Independent Albums chart.

== Native World Inc. (2006–present) ==
In 2006, Lowery left Psychopathic, continuing to release albums and merchandise from his Native World label. In 2007, Lowery performed Main Stage at the Gathering of the Juggalos, and returned to Psychopathic Records the following year. He rereleased "Rain from the Sun" with the Rattlesnake EP, as well as the Black Halloween EP, Orange Halloween EP, Detroit Warriors: Strike 1 Mixx, Detroit Warriors: Strike 2 Mixx, and Holiday Jingles EP in 2006.

The Devilish EP, and Frosty The Dopeman EP were released in 2007. The Perception vs Reality EP was released in 2012. ABK released the Don't Let Go EP in 2013.

== Mudface era (2008–2009) ==
ABK returned to the label in 2008, and released Mudface. The album featured Insane Clown Posse, Blaze Ya Dead Homie, Strict 9, and Boondox. The pamphlet in the album advertised his upcoming album, to be called Possessed. He later revealed that the idea had been scrapped.

== Medicine Bag era (2010–2011) ==
In 2010 he released his next album, titled Medicine Bag. The album featured the songs scrapped from Possessed, two on each version of the album.

== Shapeshifter era (2012–present) ==
The December 21, 2012 edition of the Juggalo publication the Hatchet Herald indicated that Lowery would release a new album in 2013, which he confirmed would be titled Shapeshifter. On March 28, 2014 Anybody Killa posted on his official Twitter account that his new album was almost finished.

In the April 11, 2014 Hatchet Herald, it was announced that ABK would release a greatest hits album titled The Perfection Collection on June 10, 2014. In a June 2014 interview with YadaMedia, ABK discussed his two new albums coming out on Psychopathic Records: Shapeshifter and Road Fools 2. During his 2014 GOTJ seminar, it was announced that he and Big Hoodoo had created a new group called Tha Hav Knots, which he said might incorporate more people other than just himself and Big Hoodoo.

On May 14, 2015, on the debut edition of Hoodoo's Hood, it was announced that ABK's Shapeshifter would be released after Young Wicked’s debut solo album Slaughter, and before Big Hoodoo's album in 2015. It was also announced that a third member would be added to Tha Hav Knots, speculated to be Bonez Dubb of Axe Murder Boyz.

On May 28, 2015 it was announced on The Warpath radio program that ABK would release "Shapeshifter (Prelude)" at the GOTJ 2015 to give the fans a taste of what the album would be like. Anybody Killa was slated to go on the "Shapeshifter Tour" with Big Hoodoo, Tha Hav Knots (ABK, Big Hoodoo, and Bonez Dubb of AMB) and Native World Showcase.

In an April 8, 2016 Faygoluvers interview with Violent J, it was said that Anybody Killa was waiting on Psychopathic Records, and J said that Psychopathic Records was waiting on Anybody Killa for the Shapeshifter album. On June 3, 2016, ABK announced via Twitter that he would have a new album titled The Lost War Chief Sessions, which would be available for pre-order soon on his online store, thewarriorspot.com, as it had originally been announced on March 7, 2016.

On January 1, 2017, ABK was invited to take part in the Juggalo March On Washington, he accepted on January 2 but ended up not participating due to the fact his royalty check from Psychopathic Records bounced. ABK also was featured on the Psypher Hurricane of Diamonds. On July 4, 2017 ABK released Killa Features on his own label. At the 2017 Gathering of the Juggalos, during ABK's seminar he was asked about the status of Shapeshifter and why it has not been released, he stated "beats". He elaborated in saying "I had DJ Chop producing it, and then he was off the label. Then Young Wicked came in, and then he was off the label. I've gone through about 3 producers. Now I can either release it as it is through Native World Inc. or spend another year working on it creating new beats. What would y'all want me to do"? With that question, the answer was unanimously voted for, releasing it as is, since it has taken 3 years to release it.

During ABK's 2018 Gathering of the Juggalos seminar he announced that the new Hav Knots album is about 80% complete. He also announced that he received word from producer Brian Kuma, that Shapeshifter was 100% complete and would be released soon. He also said that he has a new release set to come out on Psychopathic Records soon, and he will be going out on tour with DJ Clay during the fall of 2018. He also mentioned that he and Blaze Ya Dead Homie plan to do a new Drive-By album and tour, but haven't began production yet due to both of them having conflicting schedules.

On January 27, 2019 during Drive-By’s “Juggalo Unity Tour”, Anybody Killa confirmed on a Facebook livestream that Shapeshifter was finished and will be released in 2019. He also announced two more albums called Tampon Juice & Always Bringing Knowledge.

On June 10, 2019, ABK announced that Tampon Juice would be released on July 26 of that same year.

== Lyrical and performance style ==
Lowery's lyrical content draws heavily from Native American imagery. He refers to his style as being "like a spiritual rap". He states that "I get a vibe from dreams, more or less. That's where a lot of my writing comes from. That and a lot of my fans' personal experiences. [...] It's their music, my fans' music. I'm just putting it to words behind lyrics for them."

In his review of Hatchet Warrior, Johnny Loftus describes the album as crossing Native American culture with gangsta rap and horror themes and humor derived from Juggalo and cannabis culture.

Lowery has a lisp, which gives him a distinctive delivery. According to Lowery, "A lot of fans will say, 'Oh, he's just doing that to make it up.' Why would I want to make up a lisp while I'm rappin? I wish it was gone sometimes but a lot of people love it."

== Discography ==
- Rain from the Sun (2000)
- Hatchet Warrior (2003)
- Dirty History (2004)
- Mudface (2008)
- Medicine Bag (2010)
- Tampon Juice (2019)
- T.B.A. (2025)
- Shapeshifter (TBD)
- Always Bringing Knowledge (TBD)

== Supergroup membership ==
- Dark Lotus (2001–2006)
- Psychopathic Rydas (2001–2006; 2007–2017)
- Drive-By (2001–2006; 2007–present)
- Tha Hav Knots (2014–present)
- Eastside Ninjas (2020–present)
- D4L (2023–present)

== Filmography ==
- A Family Underground (2008)
- Big Money Rustlas (2010)
- Wrap It Up (2015)
