= Blaze Ya Dead Homie =

American rapper (born 1976)

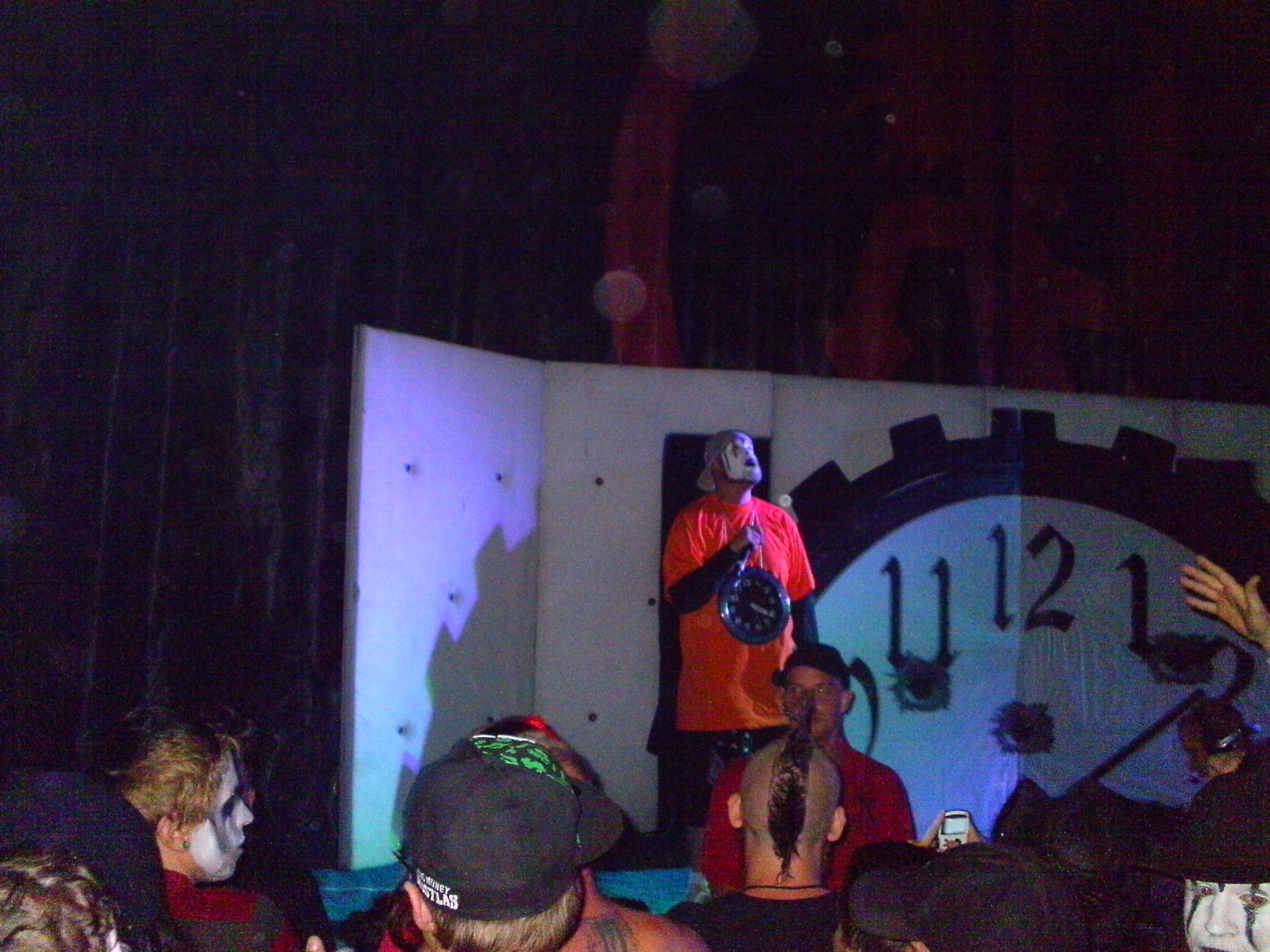
- Blaze Ya Dead Homie performing in 2011.

Background information
- Also known as: Cell Block; Psycho C Colton Grundy
- Born: Christopher C. Rouleau; April 27, 1976 (age 50)
- Origin: Mount Clemens, Michigan, United States
- Genres: Gangsta rap; horrorcore
- Occupation: Rapper
- Years active: 1993–present
- Labels: Majik Ninja; Grundy; Psychopathic; Phantom Zone
- Member of: Drive-By; Triple Threat; Zodiac MPrint; The Rydas
- Formerly of: 2 Krazy Devils; International Superstars Incorporated; Dark Lotus; Psychopathic Rydas; Samhein Witch Killaz
- Website: TheDeadManBlaze.com

Blaze Ya Dead Homie (born Christopher C. Rouleau; April 27, 1976), is an American rapper from Mount Clemens, Michigan. Known for his undead gang member stage persona, he gained prominence after signing with Psychopathic Records, where he released a self-titled extended play in 2000, followed by his debut album, 1 Less G n da Hood the following year. He later signed with Majik Ninja Entertainment.

== Biography ==
=== Pre-Psychopathic years (1993–1997) ===
Rouleau began rapping at the age of 17, while in Romeo High School, and performed at local clubs on the east side of Detroit. Rouleau performed as a member of 2 Krazy Devils (with Skrapz) under the stage name Psycho C. Rouleau's first big performance was at the Ritz in Roseville Michigan, where he and James Lowery opened for House of Krazees. House of Krazees member The R.O.C. later produced 2 Krazy Devils' only album, Flipped Insanity, before the group disbanded in 1996.

=== Psychopathic years (1998–2013) ===
Rouleau joined several groups, but no material was released. When Rouleau was about to give up rapping, he was encouraged to join Psychopathic Records, where he initially started out as a member of Insane Clown Posse's road crew. He appeared on Twiztid's Mostasteless album, and occasionally acted as a hype man in live concerts. Rouleau joined Dark Lotus and Psychopathic Rydas, performing in the latter under the stage name "Cell Block."

==== Blaze Ya Dead Homie EP (2000) ====
In 2000, Rouleau released a solo EP, Blaze Ya Dead Homie, establishing his character as a gang member killed in the late 1980s. Rouleau toured major cities across the country to support the release, including a debut at the Gathering of the Juggalos. The album was released on Psychopathic Records and Phantom Zone Productions.

==== 1 Less G n da Hood (2001–2003) ====
The LP 1 Less G n da Hood was recorded and released in 2001, followed by continued touring and appearances on several Psychopathic releases.

==== Colton Grundy: The Undying (2004–2006) ====
On October 19, 2004, Rouleau released his second studio album, Colton Grundy: The Undying. It peaked at #9 on the Billboard Top Heatseekers chart, #16 on the Top Independent Albums chart, #57 on the Top R&B/Hip-Hop Albums chart, #167 on the Top Internet Albums chart, and #167 on the Billboard 200. Rouleau formed the group Drive-By with Lowery, releasing the album Pony Down (Prelude) in 2005. The following year, Rouleau contributed two tracks to the video game 25 To Life, which also featured music by Tupac Shakur, Public Enemy, DMX, Geto Boys and Tech N9ne.

==== Clockwork Gray (2007–2009) ====
On August 21, 2007, Rouleau released his third studio album, Clockwork Gray. It peaked at #14 on the Top Independent Albums chart and at #34 on the Top R&B/Hip-Hop Albums chart. The album features Twiztid, The R.O.C., Boondox and Violent J. Twiztid, Blaze and The R.O.C. formed the group Samhein Witch Killaz. The song "Inside Looking Out" was a SWK song. In 2011, the question was asked if there would ever be a SWK EP or full-length album; it was confirmed that SWK would not be putting out any EPs or full-length albums. The R.O.C. and Blaze formed the group Zodiac MPrint, and the song "Ill Connect" was a Zodiac MPrint song. After Blaze left Psychopathic Records in late 2013, he started recording a new Zodiac MPrint CD with The R.O.C.; it was unknown if it was an EP or full-length album. On The R.O.C.'s Twitter account he announced that he has been bumping the rough cuts to the new Zodiac MPrint CD around October/November 2013. The name "Skywalkers" has been thrown around as the title for the CD; however, in the "Clockwork Gray" pamphlet, there was a promotional picture of Zodiac signs and the upcoming Zodiac CD to be called "Horrorscope".

==== Gang Rags (2010–2013) ====
Rouleau's fourth studio album, Gang Rags, was released on June 22, 2010, and debuted number 52 on the Billboard 200. While on the 2011 Drive-By Tour, he released Gang Rags Extended Version (Uncut + Uncensored). Blaze would release the original version of Gang Rags on Drive-By's 2011 tour. Blaze released an EP on the "Kaos & Kronik Tour" with Twiztid, Kottonmouth Kings and Big B titled Blaze 'n' Bake EP.

==== Leaving Psychopathic & independent releases (2013) ====
Blaze released an EP single during the 2013 Drive-By Tour independently on his own label titled Grundy Entertainment. In March 2013, Joseph Bruce speculated that Blaze Ya Dead Homie had left the label. Blaze later spoke openly about the subject during a concert, stating that he had not departed from Psychopathic. ICP publicly apologized to Blaze via Twitter for the misunderstanding; it was later confirmed during the Gathering of the Juggalos that Rouleau had indeed parted ways with Psychopathic. Later in 2013 Blaze did an interview with NE Hip Hop, saying that he had been hanging out with Strange Music in Kansas City, Missouri. He also went on to say that he wants to do some stuff with other artists he would like to work with, and also said that his fans will start seeing more of him after 2013.

=== Majik Ninja Entertainment years (2014–present) ===
==== Gang Rags: Reborn (2014–2015) ====
At the Days of Dead convention with Twiztid in early February 2014 it was announced that Blaze Ya Dead Homie had signed with Twiztid's new record label. In April 2014 it was announced on Twiztid's official Twitter account that Blaze's Gang Rags (Uncut & Uncensored) will be re-released in 2014 on Twiztid's new label. It was also announced that Blaze Ya Dead homie will be releasing two albums in 2014 if there are no major set backs. On July 19, 2014, Blaze Ya Dead Homie posted a picture on his official website showing that he will be releasing Gang Rags: Reborn sometime in late 2014. In early August 2014 on Blaze's official Instagram he posted a snippet of a new song on the album called "Fuck Shit Up". On August 22, 2014, on Blaze's official Facebook account, he released the official release date for Gang Rags: Reborn which is October 21, 2014. Also he released the official interview on his Facebook account. It was announced on September 12, 2014, by InGrooves that Twiztid's new label is called Majik Ninja Entertainment, and Gang Rags: Reborn's serial number will be MNE001. Gang Rags: Reborn charted at 106 on the billboard 200, starting Twiztid's new label off good.

==== The Casket Factory (2015–2017) ====
In early 2015 Twiztid, Blaze Ya Dead Homie and The R.O.C. posted promotional pictures for Blaze's new album titled The Casket Factory. In a May 30, 2015 interview with The Underground in Australia, Blaze announced that he will be going on tour with Kottonmouth Kings in July, Drive-By may not put anything out in 2015, but possibly in 2016. He also stated that he and The R.O.C. have been working on their groups, Zodiac MPrint, debut album here and there, while each working on new solo material. He also stated, and emphasised that his new album will be released in 2015. He may not know the official date until after his tour with Kottonmouth Kings, but he is working on picking out what songs will make the album, and he continued to say that he tries to stick to the release date that is released, he also continued to say that the album will be released in 2015. In June 2015 Twiztid posted on their Instagram account that Blaze's new album was coming along nicely and near the finishing stages. On June 29, 2015, Blaze posted a picture saying that The Casket Factory release date was coming out soon, and that he was going back to "The Dojo" to record some more for the album. Blaze will be going on tour with KMK, from July 12, 2015, through August 5, 2015. Blaze announced in early July that the official release date will be announced at the GOTJ 2015. In mid 2015 Blaze posted on his social media accounts asking fans who they would like to see him collab with on his upcoming album. This will make the first Majik Ninja Entertainment album to feature another artist off the label. During Twiztid's and Blaze Ya Dead Homie's 2015 GOTJ seminar it was announced that The Casket Factory will be released on January 15, 2016. On August 18, 2015, Majik Ninja Entertainment released Blaze's first single off The Casket Factory via SoundCloud. The single is titled "Ghost" and features Kung Fu Vampire. A few days later the second single was released titled "Wormfood", on August 21, 2016. In December 2015 the track list for the album was released and features, Kung Fu Vampire, DJ Swamp, Anybody Killa, The R.O.C., Lex "The Hex" Master, Boondox, and Twiztid. On December 23, 2015, the third single and first music video was released for the track "They Call That Gangsta" featuring The R.O.C. and Lex "The Hex" Master.

On January 20, 2016, it was announced through Blaze's official Facebook page that Blaze Ya Dead Homie will be releasing another album "soon", and is the follow-up EP to The Casket Factory titled, The Casket Maker EP. In late March/early April 2016 the fourth single and second music video for the song "Who U Looking 4?" featuring Boondox and Jamie Madrox was released. Around the same time it was announced that Zodiac MPrint would release their debut extended play titled Ride The Stars on May 20, 2016.

Alongside Twiztid, Blaze formed the supergroup Triple Threat, releasing their self-titled debut album on September 1, 2017.

=== New Album (2017–present) ===
On November 22, 2017, it was announced by Monoxide Child that he had to get back to the booth to work on some new beats for Blaze's new upcoming album. It had been hinted that "[an] album he has wanted to do for a long time, may finally happen after nearly a decade".

== Style and influences ==
Rouleau's music is a fusion of gangsta rap and horrorcore. Rouleau's music strongly derives from late 1980s/early 1990s West Coast hip-hop, and sometimes incorporates elements of rock music. Rouleau's influences include Insane Clown Posse.

== Discography ==
- 1 Less G n da Hood (2001)
- Colton Grundy: The Undying (2004)
- Clockwork Gray (2007)
- Gang Rags (2010)
- Gang Rags: Reborn (2014)
- The Casket Factory (2016)
- Cadaver (2020)
- Dead Serious (2026)

== Awards and nominations ==
Year	Nominee / work	Award	Result	Ref.
2019	Himself	Detroit Music Award for Outstanding Rap Artist	Nominated	
