= Suburban Noize Records discography =

Suburban Noize Records, also known as "Subnoize", is an independent record label based in Burbank, California, specializing in punk rock and underground hip hop. The label was founded in 1997 by Kevin Zinger and Kottonmouth Kings vocalist Brad Xavier. The label has released recordings by artists from both the punk rock and hip hop genres.

== Catalog ==
Year	Artist	Title	Peak chart positions			RIAA Certification (sales thresholds)	Co-labels
Year	Artist	Title	US	US Indie	US Heat	RIAA Certification (sales thresholds)	Co-labels
1998	Kottonmouth Kings	Stoners Reeking Havoc	—	—	—	—	—
1998	Kottonmouth Kings	Royal Highness	—	—	—	—	Capitol Records
1999	Kottonmouth Kings	Hidden Stash	59	—	—	—	Capitol Records
1999	DJ Bobby B	99 Rips Beyond	—	—	—	—	—
1999	Grand Vanacular and DJ Circa	Entering the Brain : Cerebral Meltdown	—	—	—	—	—
1999	Various artists	SRH Presents: Lose Your Illusions, Vol. 1	—	—	—	—	Interscope Records
2000	Kottonmouth Kings	High Society	65	—	—	—	Capitol Records
2000	Corporate Avenger	Taxes are Stealing	—	—	—	—	—
2000	Too Rude	Too Rude (album)	—	—	—	—	—
2000	Corporate Avenger	New Testament (album)	—	—	—	—	—
2001	Kottonmouth Kings	Hidden Stash II: The Kream of the Krop	100	—	—	—	Capitol Records
2001	DJ Bobby B	Built from Scratch (Bobby B)	—	—	—	—	—
2002	Various artists	Suburban Noize Presents: Sounds of Things to Come	—	—	—	—	—
2002	Mix Mob	So Cal Drunks	—	—	—	—	—
2002	Kottonmouth Kings	Rollin' Stoned	51	—	—	—	Capitol Records
2002	Various artists	SRH Presents: Spaded, Jaded, & Faded	—	—	—	—	—
2003	Various artists	Suburban Noize Presents: Sub-Noize Rats	—	—	—	—	—
2003	Judge D	Judgement Time: From the Mouth of the Judged...	—	—	—	—	—
2003	Big B	High Class White Trash	—	—	—	—	—
2003	Kottonmouth Kings	Stash Box	—	—	—	—	—
2003	Mower	Mower	—	—	—	—	—
2004	Humble Gods	Born Free	—	—	—	—	—
2004	DJ Bobby B	Diggin' in the Crates	—	—	—	—	—
2004	Kingspade	Kingspade (album)	—	31	44	—	—
2004	OPM	For Them Asses	—	—	—	—	—
2004	Various artists	The Royal Family	—	—	—	—	—
2004	Tsunami Brothers	King Harbor	—	—	—	—	—
2004	Too Rude	Re-invention	—	—	—	—	—
2004	Kottonmouth Kings	Fire it Up	42	—	—	—	—
2005	Kottonmouth Kings	The Kottonmouth Xperience	—	—	—	—	—
2005	Kottonmouth Kings	Kottonmouth Kings (album)	50	—	—	—	—
2005	Kottonmouth Kings	Joint Venture	193	13	—	—	—
2005	Judge D	No Compromize	—	—	—	—	—
2005	Big B	White Trash Renegade	—	—	—	—	—
2005	The Dirtball	Pop-A-D-Ball	—	—	—	—	—
2006	Wicked Wisdom	Wicked Wisdom	—	45	44	—	Interscope Records
2006	Last Laugh (band)	Ashamed of It	—	—	—	—	—
2006	The Dirtball	Raptillion	—	—	—	—	—
2006	Daddy X	Family Ties	—	—	—	—	—
2006	Big B	Big B Presents: Random Stuff	—	—	—	—	—
2006	Mower	Not For You	—	—	—	—	—
2006	Kottonmouth Kings	Nickel Bag	—	—	—	—	—
2006	Hed PE	Back 2 Base X	154	12	—	—	—
2006	OPM	California Poppy	—	—	—	—	—
2006	SubNoize Souljaz	Droppin' Bombz	—	—	—	—	—
2006	Potluck	Straight Outta Humboldt	—	—	—	—	—
2006	Authority Zero	Rhythm and Booze	—	—	—	—	—
2006	Kottonmouth Kings	Hidden Stash III	199	—	—	—	—
2006	Kottonmouth Kings	Koast II Koast	39	—	—	—	—
2007	Hed PE	Insomnia	138	16	—	—	—
2007	D.I.	On The Western Front	—	—	—	—	—
2007	Mondo Generator	Dead Planet	—	—	—	—	—
2007	Danny Diablo	Thugcore 4 Life	—	—	—	—	—
2007	Last Laugh (band)	No Regrets	—	—	—	—	—
2007	Last Laugh	Cooler Full of Rocks	—	—	—	—	—
2007	X-Clan	Return from Mecca	—	—	—	—	—
2007	OPM	The Opmden	—	—	—	—	—
2007	Unwritten Law	The Hit List	—	—	—	—	—
2007	Kingspade	P.T.B.	—	—	—	—	—
2007	Big B	More To Hate	—	42	17	—	—
2007	Various Artists	SRH Presents: Supporting Radical Habits	—	—	—	—	—
2007	Various Artists	SRH Presents: Supporting Radical Habits II	—	—	—	—	—
2007	Kottonmouth Kings	Cloud Nine	44	—	—	—	—
2008	Kottonmouth Kings	Greatest Highs	168	—	—	—	Capitol Records
2008	Kottonmouth Kings	The Green Album	42	—	—	—	—
2008	Kottonmouth Kings	The Kottonmouth Experience, Vol. 2	—	—	—	—	—
2008	X-Clan	Mainstream Outlaw	—	—	—	—	—
2008	DGAF	DGAF (album)	—	—	—	—	—
2008	Unwritten Law	Unwritten Law: Live and Lawless	—	—	—	—	—
2008	Sen Dog	Diary of a Mad Dog	—	—	—	—	—
2008	OPM	Golden State of Mind	—	—	—	—	—
2008	Unwritten Law	Live and Lawless	—	—	—	—	—
2008	The Dirtball	Crook County	—	—	—	—	—
2008	Kottonmouth Kings	Rollin' Down the Highway	—	—	—	—	—
2009	Kottonmouth Kings	Hidden Stash 420	—	—	—	—	—
2009	Hed PE	New World Orphans	72	4	—	—	—
2009	BLESTeNATION	Mbugout City	—	—	—	—	—
2009	Taintstick	6 Pounds of Sound	120	—	2	—	—
2009	Mower (band)	Make it a Double	—	—	—	—	—
2009	La Coka Nostra	100% Pure Coka EP	—	—	—	—	—
2009	The Dirtball	Crowned By The Kings	—	—	—	—	—
2009	Big B	American Underdog	—	—	—	—	—
2009	Kingspade	Throw Your Spades Up	—	—	—	—	—
2009	Potluck	Pipe Dreams	—	—	—	—	—
2009	La Coka Nostra	A Brand You Can Trust	—	—	—	—	Uncle Howie Records
2009	SubNoize Souljaz	Blast From The Past	—	—	—	—	—
2009	Johnny Richter	Johnny Richter: In The Trenches V.1	—	—	—	—	—
2009	Daddy X	Daddy X: In The Trenches V.2	—	—	—	—	—
2009	The Dirtball	The Dirtball: In The Trenches V.3	—	—	—	—	—
2009	Saint Dog	Saint Dog: In The Trenches V.4	—	—	—	—	—
2009	Judge D	Judge D: In The Trenches V.5	—	—	—	—	—
2009	Dogboy	Dogboy: In The Trenches V.6	—	—	—	—	—
2009	Swollen Members	Armed to the Teeth (Swollen Members album)	—	—	—	—	—
2010	Authority Zero	Stories of Survival	—	43	—	—	—
2010	D-Loc	Made for Kings (Kottonmouth Kings Presents: D-Loc)	—	—	—	—	—
2010	Kottonmouth Kings	Long Live The Kings	26	—	—	—	—
2010	Various Artists	SRH Presents In Spade We Trust	—	—	—	—	—
2010	Potluck	Greatest Hits With My Buds	—	—	—	—	—
2010	Hed PE	Truth Rising	98	13	—	—	—
2010	Johnny Richter	Kottonmouth Kings Present Johnny Richter: Laughing	—	—	—	—	—
2011	Kottonmouth Kings	Legalize It EP	—	—	—	—	—
2011	Kottonmouth Kings	Sunrise Sessions	46	—	—	—	—
2011	Kottonmouth Kings	Hidden Stash V: Bongloads & B-Sides	—	—	—	—	—
2011	X-Pistols	Shoot to Kill	—	—	—	—	—
2011	Moonshine Bandits	Whiskey and Women	—	—	—	—	—
2011	Saigon	The Greatest Story Never Told	61	—	—	—	—
2011	Saigon	The Bonus Story	—	—	—	—	—
2011	Swollen Members	Dagger Mouth	—	—	—	—	—
2011	Glasses Malone	Beach Cruiser	165	20	—	—	—
2011	Jeffry Nothing	The New Psychodalia	—	—	—	—	—
2011	Big B	Music for Misfits	—	—	—	—	—
2011	Potluck	Rhymes And Resin	—	—	—	—	—
2011	The Dirtball	Nervous System	—	—	—	—	—
2011	Unwritten Law	Swan	195	—	—	—	—
2011	Slaine	A World with No Skies	—	—	—	—	—
2012	Prevail	Spasefase EP	—	—	—	—	—
2012	Madchild	Little Monster EP	—	—	—	—	—
2012	Subnoize Souljaz	Underground Collabos	—	—	—	—	—
2012	Authority Zero	Less Rhythm More Booze	—	—	—	—	—
2012	Madchild	The EP Collection	—	—	—	—	—
2012	Mickey Avalon	On The Ave EP	—	—	—	—	—
2012	D-Loc	Weedman EP	—	—	—	—	—
2012	Jahred	United EP	—	—	—	—	—
2012	Subnoize Souljaz	Suburban Noize Records Underground History V.1 The Early Years	—	—	—	—	—
2012	Mickey Avalon	Loaded	—	—	—	—	—
2012	The Dirtball	Desert Eagle EP	—	—	—	—	—
2012	DJ Bobby B	The Shakedown EP	—	—	—	—	—
2012	Kottonmouth Kings	Mile High	—	—	—	—	—
2012	Madchild	Dope Sick	—	—	—	—	—
2012	La Coka Nostra	Masters of the Dark Arts	—	—	—	—	—
2012	Saigon	The Greatest Story Never Told Chapter 2: Bread and Circuses	—	—	—	—	—
2012	Moonshine Bandits	Whiskey and Women Deluxe Shiner Edition	—	—	—	—	—
2013	Swollen Members	Beautiful Death Machine	—	—	—	—	Battle Axe Records
2013	Slaine	The Boston Project	—	—	—	—	—
2013	Big B	Fool's Gold	—	—	—	—	—
2013	Madchild	Lawn Mower Man	—	—	—	—	Battle Axe Records
2013	Potluck	The Humboldt Chronicles	—	—	—	—	—
2013	Hed PE	The Best of Hed Planet Earth	—	—	—	—	—
2013	Johnny Richter	FreeKING Out EP	—	—	—	—	—
2014	Moonshine Bandits	Calicountry	—	—	—	—	BackRoad Records/Average Joes Entertainment
2014	Swollen Members	Brand New Day	—	—	—	—	Battle Axe Records
2014	Hed PE	Evolution	—	—	—	—	—
2014	Slaine	The King of Everything Else	—	—	—	—	—
2014	Madchild	Switched On EP	—	—	—	—	Battle Axe Records
2014	Saigon	The Greatest Story Never Told Chapter 3: The Troubled Times of Brian Carenard	—	—	—	—	Squid Ink Squad Records

== Music videos ==
Year	Artist	Title	Director(s)
1996	Hed PE	"Serpent Boy"	Raul Cobb
1997	Hed PE	"Ground"	Ghetto Fabulous
2000	Hed PE	"Bartender"	Marc Klasfeld
2001	Hed PE	"Killing Time"	Demian Rami Lichteinstein
2001	Hed PE	"The Meadow"	Chizad
2002	Kottonmouth Kings	"Sleepers"	Suburban Noize Records
2003	Hed PE	"Blackout"	VEM & Tony
2005	Hed PE	"Represent"	Dale Resteghini
2006	Wicked Wisdom	"Bleed All Over Me"	Dean Karr
2006	Wicked Wisdom	"Something Inside of Me"	Suburban Noize Records
2006	Hed PE	"Get Ready"	Suburban Noize Records
2007	Hed PE	"Suffa"	Devin DeHaven
2008	Hed PE	"Ordo (Ab Chao)"	Devin DeHaven
2008	Hed PE	"Renegade"	Chad Archibald, Philip Carrer
2009	Hed PE	"Here and Now"	Dale Resteghini
2010	Hed PE	"No Rest for the Wicked"	Joey Nugent
2010	Hed PE	"Truth Rising"	Joey Nugent
2010	Hed PE	"It's All Over"	Joey Nugent
2012	Madchild	"Shit Talker"	D-Shot
2012	Madchild	"Dungeon Dragon"	D-Shot
2012	Madchild	"Wanted"	D-Shot
2012	Madchild	"Gremlin"	Gabriel Carrer
2012	Madchild	"Mr. Peter Parker Freestyle"	D-Shot
2012	Madchild	"Out of My Head"	Aspect
2012	Madchild	"Devil`s Reject"	David McDonald
2012	Madchild	"Monster"	David McDonald
2012	Madchild	"Jitters"	David McDonald
2012	Madchild	"Runaway"	Justin Donnelly
2012	Madchild	"Broken Mirror"	Patrick Lozinski
2012	Madchild	"Cyphin"	D-Shot
2016	Hed PE	"Pay Me"	Eric Richter
2020	Dropout Kings	"GlitchGang"	Joe Lana Jr.
2021	Dropout Kings	"Virus"	Chucky Guzman
2021	Hed PE	"Sandmine"	Eitan Melody (EITANS DESIGNS)
2021	Dropout Kings	"PitUp"	Dylan Toon
2021	King Klick	"Who's Next?"	Eitan Melody (EITANS DESIGNS)
2022	Dropout Kings	"Hey Uh"	Jacob Reynolds
2022	Madchild x Obnoxious	"Skull Mask"	King Zabb
2022	Madchild x Obnoxious	"Drop Off"	King Zabb
2023	Madchild x Obnoxious	"Talons"	King Zabb
2023	Madchild x Obnoxious	"Lost Cause"	King Zabb
2023	Moonshine Bandits	"I'm A Problem (feat. Madchild)"	Josh Fields
2023	Long Beach Dub Allstars	"Precious Time"	Sun Bronx
2023	Long Beach Dub Allstars	"Somewhere"	Small Axe Films Online
2023	Long Beach Dub Allstars	"Preacha"	Anthony Turrietta
2025	Stacc Styles	"Gold Mine"	Stacc Styles
2025	Stacc Styles	"Without A Crown"	Stacc Styles

== Filmography ==
Title	Released
Dopeumentary	May 8, 2001
Stoners Reeking Havoc	October 22, 2002
Endless Highway	August 12, 2003
The Adventures of Twitch and Scummy	December 2, 2003
Fuck the Bullshit - The Taxman Movie	January 20, 2004
Spaded Surf Video	October 26, 2004
Sub Noize Ratz Video Compilation	November 16, 2004
10 Years Deep	January 25, 2005
Manley and Morrison: F.S.U.	October 31, 2006
The Joint Is on Fire	February 20, 2007
Throw Your Spades Up!	February 19, 2008
The DIY Guys	May 13, 2008
