= Greatest Highs =

Greatest hits album by Kottonmouth Kings
- Released: January 15, 2008
- Recorded: 1998–2007
- Genre: Rap rock
- Length: 2:34:51
- Label: Suburban Noize; Capitol
- Producer: Daddy X; I Timothy; DogBoy; E-Man; Marco Forcone; Mellow B. De Lear; Mike Kumagai; P-Nice

Kottonmouth Kings chronology
| Cloud Nine (2007) | Greatest Highs (2008) | The Kottonmouth Xperience Vol. II: Kosmic Therapy (2008) |

Professional ratings
Review scores
| Source | Rating |
|---|---|
| AllMusic | 4/5 stars |

Greatest Highs is the greatest hits album by American rap rock group Kottonmouth Kings. It was released on January 15, 2008, via Suburban Noize/Capitol Records.

The album consists of 37 previously released songs from the group's first eight studio albums and two compilations (Joint Venture and Hidden Stash III), plus two new songs ("Can Anybody Hear Me?" and "No Future"). It features guest appearances from Corporate Avenger, Cypress Hill, Insane Clown Posse, Jack Grisham, Krizz Kaliko, Tech N9ne and Too Rude. The compilation peaked at number 168 on the Billboard 200 albums chart in the United States.

== Track listing ==
| No. | Title | Writer(s) | Producer(s) | Length |
|---|---|---|---|---|
| 1. | "Where's the Weed At?" | Brad Xavier; Dustin Miller; Timothy McNutt; Michael Kumagai | Daddy X; Mike Kumagai | 4:07 |
| 2. | "Full Throttle" | Xavier; Miller; McNutt; Kumagai; Doug Carrion | Daddy X; Mike Kumagai | 4:07 |
| 3. | "Bump" | Xavier; Miller; Steven Thronson; Marco Forcone; Joseph Bishara | Marco Forcone | 3:52 |
| 4. | "Put It Down" (featuring Cypress Hill) | Xavier; Miller; McNutt; Louis Freese; Senen Reyes; Kumagai | Daddy X; Mike Kumagai | 4:56 |
| 5. | "Fire It Up" | Xavier; Miller; McNutt; Kumagai | Daddy X; Mike Kumagai | 4:07 |
| 6. | "First Class" | Xavier; Miller; McNutt; Kumagai | Daddy X; Mike Kumagai | 3:26 |
| 7. | "City 2 City" (featuring Tech N9ne and Krizz Kaliko) | Xavier; Miller; McNutt; Aaron D. Yates; Samuel Watson; Robert Rebeck | Daddy X; Mike Kumagai | 4:12 |
| 8. | "4-2-0" | Xavier; Miller; McNutt; Kumagai | Daddy X; Mike Kumagai | 4:04 |
| 9. | "Peace of Mind" | Xavier; Miller; McNutt; Kumagai | Daddy X; Mike Kumagai | 3:37 |
| 10. | "Tell Me Why" | Xavier; Miller; McNutt; Kumagai; Robert Rogers | Daddy X; Mike Kumagai | 4:11 |
| 11. | "Outcast" | Xavier; Miller; McNutt; Kumagai; Carrion | Daddy X; Mike Kumagai | 3:08 |
| 12. | "King Klick" | Xavier; Miller; McNutt; Kumagai | Daddy X; Mike Kumagai | 4:12 |
| 13. | "Day Dreamin' Fazes" | Xavier; Miller; McNutt; Kumagai; Carrion | Daddy X; Mike Kumagai | 3:36 |
| 14. | "Tangerine Sky" | Xavier; Miller; McNutt; Kumagai; Ricky Gaez | Daddy X; Mike Kumagai | 4:11 |
| 15. | "Friends" | Xavier; Miller; McNutt; Kumagai | Daddy X; Mike Kumagai | 3:43 |
| 16. | "Bad Habits" | Xavier; Miller; McNutt; Kumagai | Daddy X; Mike Kumagai | 3:50 |
| 17. | "Rest of My Life" | Xavier; Miller; McNutt; Gaez | Daddy X; Mike Kumagai | 5:41 |
| 18. | "Dog's Life" (featuring Too Rude) | Xavier; Miller; Thronson; Rogers | Daddy X; I Timothy; DogBoy | 4:22 |
| 19. | "Positive Vibes" | Xavier; Miller; McNutt; Kumagai; Carrion | Daddy X; Mike Kumagai | 3:42 |
| 20. | "Can Anybody Hear Me?" | Xavier; Miller; McNutt; Kumagai | Daddy X; Mike Kumagai | 4:26 |
| 21. | "Everybody Move" | Xavier; Miller; McNutt; Kumagai | Daddy X; Mike Kumagai | 3:47 |
| 22. | "Suburban Life" | Xavier; Miller; Thronson; AK Bros. | Daddy X | 3:34 |
| 23. | "Livin' Proof" | Xavier; Miller; McNutt; Kumagai | Daddy X; Mike Kumagai; P-Nice | 2:52 |
| 24. | "Bring It On" | Xavier; Miller; McNutt; Kumagai | Daddy X; Mike Kumagai | 3:49 |
| 25. | "King's Blend" | Xavier; Miller; McNutt; Eric Adger | E-Man | 4:08 |
| 26. | "Sub-Noize Rats" | Xavier; Miller; McNutt; Carrion | Daddy X; Mike Kumagai | 2:39 |
| 27. | "SRH" | Xavier; Miller; McNutt; Kumagai | Daddy X; Mike Kumagai | 3:57 |
| 28. | "The Lottery" | Xavier; Miller; McNutt | Daddy X; Mike Kumagai | 4:34 |
| 29. | "Think 4 Yourself" (featuring Insane Clown Posse) | Xavier; Miller; McNutt; Joseph Bruce; Joey Utsler; Kumagai | Daddy X; Mike Kumagai | 4:08 |
| 30. | "Float Away" | Xavier; Miller; McNutt; Kumagai; Gaez | Daddy X; Mike Kumagai | 3:59 |
| 31. | "Peace Not Greed" (featuring Jack Grisham and Corporate Avenger) | Xavier; Miller; McNutt; Jack Grisham; Francis Xavier; Ron Emory; Michael Roche | Daddy X; Mike Kumagai | 4:54 |
| 32. | "Dying Daze" | Xavier; Miller; McNutt; Kumagai; Carrion | Daddy X; Mike Kumagai | 3:25 |
| 33. | "Bong Tokin' Alcoholics" | Xavier; Miller; Thronson; AK Bros. | Daddy X | 3:44 |
| 34. | "Gone Git High" | Xavier; Miller; McNutt; Kumagai | Daddy X; Mike Kumagai; P-Nice | 4:13 |
| 35. | "So High" | Xavier; Miller; Thronson; Andre Williams; Keith Williams | Daddy X | 3:49 |
| 36. | "Life Rolls On" | Xavier; Miller; McNutt; Kumagai | Daddy X; Mike Kumagai | 3:58 |
| 37. | "Life Ain't What It Seems" | Xavier; Miller; Thronson; Mellow Delear | Daddy X; Mellow B. De Lear | 3:59 |
| 38. | "No Future" | Xavier; Miller; McNutt; Patrick Shevelin | P-Nice | 4:06 |
| 39. | "Rip the Night Away" | Xavier; Miller; McNutt; Carrion | Daddy X; Mike Kumagai | 3:46 |
| Total length: | | | | 2:34:51 |

Best Buy bonus tracks
| No. | Title | Length |
|---|---|---|
| 40. | "Had Enough" | 1:39 |
| 41. | "Pack Me Another Rip" | 2:20 |
| 42. | "The Lottery (E-Swift Remix)" | 4:48 |
| 43. | "Proud to Be a Stoner (Remix)" | 5:24 |

Notes

- Tracks 1, 15 and 21 were taken from Koast II Koast (2006)
- Tracks 2, 8, 14, 17, 19, 26 and 30 were taken from Rollin' Stoned (2002)
- Tracks 3, 18, 22, 33, 35 and 37 were taken from Royal Highness (1998)
- Tracks 4, 9 and 12 were taken from No. 7 (2005)
- Tracks 5, 11, 16, 24 and 39 were taken from Fire It Up (2004)
- Tracks 6, 13, 25, 28 and 31 were taken from High Society (2000)
- Tracks 7, 23 and 29 were taken from Cloud Nine (2007)
- Tracks 10, 32 and 36 were taken from Hidden Stash II: The Kream of the Krop (2001)
- Track 27 is taken from Joint Venture (2005)
- Track 34 is taken from Hidden Stash III (2006)
- Tracks 20 and 38 are exclusive for this release.

== Personnel ==
- Brad "Daddy X" Xavier – producer, executive producer, liner notes
- Dave English – producer
- Kevin Zinger – executive producer
- Jane Ventom – executive producer
- Patrick "P-Nice" Shevelin – re-mastering
- Tom Baker – re-mastering
- Casey Quintal – art direction, design, layout
- Droopy – artwork
- Barry Underhill – photography
- Fabrice Henssens – photography

== Charts ==
| Chart (2008) | Peak position |
|---|---|
| US Billboard 200 | 168 |
