= Hidden Stash 420 =

Compilation album by Kottonmouth Kings
- Released: October 13, 2009
- Length: 2:34:51
- Label: Suburban Noize
- Producer: Daddy X and Kevin Zinger

Kottonmouth Kings chronology
The Green Album (2008)	Hidden Stash 420 (2009)	Long Live The Kings (2010)

Professional ratings
Review scores
Source	Rating
Allmusic	3/5 stars
RapReviews	(7/10)

Hidden Stash 420 is a 2009 compilation album from American hip hop group Kottonmouth Kings. It is their fourth compilation album and includes b-sides, remixes, demos, solo tracks by Kottonmouth Kings members D-Loc and Johnny Richter, and collaborations with other artists. The album comprises 40 tracks on two discs.

The Best Buy edition of the album includes a bonus DVD titled Lost Adventures which consists of two hours of behind the scenes footage and videos.

== Track listing ==
=== Disc one ===
#	Title	Artist	Time	Original Release
1	Intro	Kottonmouth Kings	0:49	Hidden Stash 420
2	Can Anybody Hear Me	Kottonmouth Kings	4:23	Greatest Highs
3	Take A Ride	D-Loc & Judge D	3:44	The Green Album (Best Buy bonus CD)
4	Evolution	Johnny Richter	3:13	Hidden Stash 420
5	Say Goodbye To The Tangerine Sky	Kottonmouth Kings	6:55	420 Freedom Sampler EP
6	D Iz Who I B	D-Loc	4:14	Hidden Stash 420
7	Got It Get It	Kingspade	4:31	Hidden Stash 420
8	Stoner Bitch	Potluck (feat. Kottonmouth Kings)	4:36	Strange Noize Tour (2008 promo CD)
9	Late Night Call	Judge D & Daddy X	4:05	Hidden Stash 420
10	Lookin' Out My Window	Johnny Richter (feat. Daddy X)	3:50	Hidden Stash 420
11	Mushroom Cloud	The Dirtball (feat. Daddy X)	3:18	Crook County by The Dirtball
12	This is for You	Daddy X, Judge D, The Dirtball	3:34	Hidden Stash 420
13	Pack Me Another Rip	Kottonmouth Kings	2:17	Greatest Highs (Best Buy bonus CD)
14	Purple Smoke	Kottonmouth Kings (feat. Judge D)	4:11	420 Freedom Sampler EP
15	Demons	Kottonmouth Kings (feat. The Dirtball)	3:46	420 Freedom Sampler EP
16	Adventures of This	Kingspade	3:42	Sub-Noize Rats (compilation album)
17	Superstar	Big B (feat. Daddy X)	3:34	American Underdog by Big B
18	Sick Adventure	Kottonmouth Kings (feat. Judge D)	4:15	Hidden Stash 420
19	Sacrifice	Tech N9ne (feat. Kottonmouth Kings)	4:58	Strange Noize Tour (2007 promo CD)
20	Let the Music Play	Kottonmouth Kings	4:30	Hidden Stash 420

=== Disc two ===
#	Title	Artist	Time	Original Release
1	Runnin' Things	Kottonmouth Kings	3:34	Supporting Radical Habits II (compilation album)
2	Wind Me Up	(Hed) P.E (feat. Kottonmouth Kings & Tech N9ne)	5:11	Insomnia by (Hed) P.E
3	Problem Addict	Kottonmouth Kings (feat. Tech N9ne)	3:14	Strange Noize Tour (2007 promo CD)
4	New Vision	Daddy X, Dogboy, The Dirtball	4:08	Hidden Stash 420
5	Rebel Music	Daddy X & Judge D	3:55	Hidden Stash 420
6	We Can Smoke	Big B (feat. Kottonmouth Kings)	3:07	More to Hate by Big B
7	Spark It Up	Kottonmouth Kings	3:14	The Green Album (Best Buy bonus CD)
8	Dank in My Brain	Daddy X, Judge D, The Dirtball	4:38	Hidden Stash 420
9	Grind	The Dirtball (feat. Johnny Richter)	3:21	Crook County by The Dirtball
10	Miss Smokey	D-Loc & Johnny Richter	3:47	The Green Album (Best Buy bonus CD)
11	Get Up	BrokeNCYDE (feat. Daddy X)	3:48	I'm Not a Fan, But the Kids Like It! by BrokeNCYDE
12	No Future (P-Nice Remix)	Kottonmouth Kings (feat. Brother J of X-Clan)	5:06	Hidden Stash 420
13	Keep it Movin'	Daddy X & Judge D	3:24	Hidden Stash 420
14	Don't Sleep on the Streets	Sen Dog (feat. Johnny Richter)	3:36	Diary of a Mad Dog by Sen Dog
15	Bumpin'	Potluck & Daddy X	3:41	Hidden Stash 420
16	Tip Off	Kottonmouth Kings (feat. Judge D)	4:04	Hidden Stash 420
17	Action	Daddy X, Tech N9ne, The Dirtball, Big B	3:28	Strange Noize Tour (2007 promo CD)
18	Funky Rhyme	Danny Diablo (feat. Daddy X & Subhoodz)	3:39	Thugcore 4 Life by Danny Diablo
19	Endless Highway (Full Tank Remix)	Kottonmouth Kings	3:07	Rollin' Down the Highway
20	High Hopes	Kottonmouth Kings	4:28	The Green Album (Best Buy bonus CD)
