= The Royal Family (album) =

Compilation album
- Released: August 10, 2004
- Recorded: 2004
- Genre: Rap; Hip hop Alternative rock
- Label: Suburban Noize
- Producer: Brad "Daddy X", Mike Kumagai, Patrick "P-Nice" Shevelin

The Royal Family is the fourth compilation album by Suburban Noize Records, released on August 10, 2004.

== Track listing ==
#	Title	Featured Artist
1	Down 4 Da Krown	Kottonmouth Kings
2	This Dat Beat	Kingspade
3	Dyin Breath	Daddy X
4	Nuthin Left	Judge D
5	Spin Dat Shit	Kingspade
6	Live Today (Dancehall Version)	Kottonmouth Kings
7	Everybody Must Get Stoned	Daddy X
8	Rollin	OPM
9	We're Ill	Disfunction-Ill
10	SoCal Thugsta	Saint Dog and Big Hoss
11	Rock It Science	Phunk Junkeez
12	Another Day	Humble Gods
13	Bulldoggin	Dirtball
14	Raise It Up	Big B
15	Stepyogameup	Disfunction-Ill
16	Perfect Day	OPM
17*	Not Today	Too Rude
18*	Snitch	Mower
19*	Kill That	SX-10
20*	Your Right	Judge D
21*	Questions and Answers (Tell Me Why remix)	Kottonmouth Kings

(*) indicates Japanese Release Only
