= Classic Hits Live =

Live album by Kottonmouth Kings
- Released: August 12, 2003
- Recorded: 2003
- Label: Suburban Noize Records
- Producer: Brad Daddy X

Kottonmouth Kings chronology
Rollin' Stoned (2002)	Classic Hits Live (2003)	Fire it Up (2004)

Classic Hits Live is a live album from the Kottonmouth Kings released on August 12, 2003. They recorded one song from every city of the tour for this 2 disc cd.

== Track listing ==
=== Disc one ===
#	Title	Length
1	Intro	2:48
2	Suburban Life	3:33
3	Dying Daze	3:32
4	Day Dreamin' Fazes	3:35
5	Bump	4:13
6	Bi-Polar	3:14
7	Enjoy	3:34
8	Tha Joint	3:34
9	Full Throttle	4:17
10	Paid Vacation	2:51
11	Good As Gold/King's Blend/Zero Tolerance	11:03
12	What's Your Trip?	3:34
13	Walkin' Dream/Rest Of My Life	5:58

=== Disc two ===
#	Title	Length
1	Sub Noize Rats	2:49
2	4-2-0	2:50
3	First Class	3:20
4	Spies	3:58
5	Life Rolls On	4:04
6	Peace Not Greed	4:33
7	Bong Tokin' Alcoholics	3:39
8	Pushin' Limits	2:11
9	Round & Round	2:41
10	Lottery	3:15
11	So High	2:48
12	Tell Me Why	3:06
13	Tangerine Sky	2:53
14	Positive Vibes/Light It Up	10:53
