= The Kottonmouth Xperience =

Remix album by Kottonmouth Kings
- Released: November 16, 2004
- Recorded: 2004
- Label: Suburban Noize Records
- Producer: Brad Daddy X

Kottonmouth Kings chronology
| Fire it up (2004) | The Kottonmouth Xperience (2004) | Kottonmouth Kings (2005) |

The Kottonmouth Xperience is the Kottonmouth Kings' sixth official album released on November 16, 2004. It contains remixes of previous songs. The album includes a bonus DVD of the same name, The Kottonmouth Xperience.

== Track listing ==
| # | Title | Time |
|---|---|---|
| 1 | Dream States | 2:39 |
| 2 | Questions & Answers | 2:37 |
| 3 | Long Strange Trip | 1:57 |
| 4 | Peace Pipe | 2:48 |
| 5 | Psychedelic Sky | 3:27 |
| 6 | Zen State | 4:16 |
| 7 | Rip The Night Away | 4:07 |
| 8 | Amsterdam | 4:25 |
| 9 | Gravity Bong | 3:29 |
| 10 | Elevation | 1:39 |
| 11 | Passin By | 3:45 |
| 12 | Truth or Dare | 3:36 |
| 13 | Live for Today | 4:07 |
| 14 | Rainy Daze | 3:32 |
| 15 | Free the Plant | 3:25 |
