= Doug Carrion =

- Born: November 9, 1964 (age 61)
- Genres: Punk rock, hard rock, rap rock, Americana
- Occupations: Guitarist, singer, audio engineer, record producer, composer, music editor
- Instruments: Guitar, bass guitar, vocals
- Years active: 1985–present
- Labels: New Alliance, National Trust, Dischord, Giant, Elastic, East West, Futurist, Hollywood, Capitol, Suburban Noize

Doug Carrion (born November 9, 1964) is an American musician, audio engineer, record producer, and music editor. He played bass guitar in the punk rock bands the Descendents and Dag Nasty during the 1980s, and in the hard rock band For Love Not Lisa in the early 1990s, and is currently in the band Field Day. He has had a long working relationship with Brad "Daddy X" Xavier, playing with him in the punk rock bands Doggy Style and Humble Gods, working with his rap rock group the Kottonmouth Kings in the 2000s, and playing on his solo albums. Carrion has also composed, edited, and recorded music for television and films, including several reality television series and game shows during the 2000s. In 2012 he started his own Americana group, Doug C and the Blacklisted.

== Career ==
=== 1980s: Descendents, Doggy Style, and Dag Nasty ===
Carrion attended Mira Costa High School in Manhattan Beach, California with Descendents drummer Bill Stevenson and singer Milo Aukerman. He was the singer of CON 800 (John Allds played bass guitar) and Fletcher Dragge of Pennywise played lead guitar, with whom he recorded demos in Dougs tiny garage. In 1985 he joined the Descendents, replacing original bassist Tony Lombardo, and accompanied the band on their first tour: "I get this weird note on my door, and it's like 'Hey, this is Bill. I'm thinking about doing the Descendents again. Tony can't do it, so I want to know if you want to give it a swing.' So we practiced getting me brought up to speed and then, right as school was ready to stop, Milo jumped in the van and we started doing shows." He later recalled of the experience:

That first tour was probably one of the most difficult tours and the funnest tour at the same time. The hard part was we were traveling in this horrible, horrible, beat-up '71 Ford Econoline van in the dead of summer with no air conditioning. You're laying on this plywood loft and the sun's sweltering on the ceiling. You stay at sketchy houses in sketchy neighborhoods with sketchy people. There's a show on Friday and Saturday, and then you're just wandering the states wondering what to do. "Holy smokes, there’s a show in Seattle and we're in El Paso. How many days do we have to get there? Nine. What are we gonna do for nine days?" Funny, crazy, and everybody was kind of dedicated to having about as much fun as could happen in a 24-hour period.

On the band's return to Los Angeles, Carrion lived with them in their rehearsal space, a storefront in Lomita, California. He performed on their 1986 album Enjoy!, for which he co-wrote seven songs. He left the band in the fall of that year: "I just wanted to keep kind of experimenting, and that's really it. It was like 'Okay, cool, you're taking the ship north, I'm going south. Roger!'" He joined the punk rock band Doggy Style, his first collaboration with Brad "Daddy X" Xavier, playing on their 1986 album The Last Laugh. In March 1987 he moved to Washington, D.C. to join Dag Nasty, performing on the albums Wig Out at Denko's (1987) and Field Day (1988) and the EPs All Ages Show (1987) and Trouble Is (1988).

=== 1990s: For Love Not Lisa and Humble Gods ===
Carrion briefly fronted his own band, Pale, who released one single, "And Shed Her Skin" / "Reunion" (1990), and one EP, Tantrum (1991). He produced Ultrahead's 1992 album Cementruck. He then joined the hard rock band For Love Not Lisa, with whom he engineered, produced, and played bass guitar on the album Merge (1993), EP Softhand (1993), and single "Good Intentions" / "Hallowed Be" (1994). He also produced and played guitar on Ultrahead's 1994 album Definition: Aggro. In 1995 Carrion joined Daddy X's Hermosa Beach, California-based punk rock band Humble Gods, playing guitar on their albums Humble Gods (1995) and No Heroes (1996).

=== 2000s: Kottonmouth Kings and film and television work ===
In 2000 Carrion briefly sang in the hardcore punk band Six Degrees of Right, who released one demo. From 2000–2006 he collaborated with Daddy X on a number of projects, beginning with playing guitar on the song "Peace Not Greed" on the rap rock group Kottonmouth Kings' 2000 album High Society. He went on to play guitar and/or bass on the group's subsequent four studio albums: Hidden Stash II: The Kream of the Krop (2001), Rollin' Stoned (2002), Fire It Up (2004), and Kottonmouth Kings (2005). He also played guitar on King Harbor, a 2003 album by Kottonmouth Kings side project Tsunami Brothers; joined the reunited Humble Gods for their 2004 album Born Free, which he also produced; played a mob boss in the direct-to-video film F**k The Bull-s**t - The Taxman Movie (2004) starring Kottonmouth Kings hype man The Taxman; and performed on Daddy X's solo albums Organic Soul (2004) and Family Ties (2006).

The second half of the decade saw Carrion switch from albums and live performances to producing music for television and films. He composed music for Last Laugh '05, the 2005 installment of Comedy Central's annual comedy special. For the soundtrack of the 2006 film The Still Life, in which he played a small role as a security guard, Carrion wrote five songs with director Joel A. Miller and performed them with Adrian Young of No Doubt. He also wrote and performed the song "Everything Is Gonna Be OK" for the direct-to-video film American Pie Presents: Beta House (2007) and composed music for the documentary film Celebrity Art Show (2008). As a music editor, Carrion worked on several reality television series and game shows including Beauty and the Geek (2005–06, 9 episodes), The Biggest Loser (2006, 41 episodes), 7 Day Switch (2006), Identity (2006–07, 12 episodes), Science of Love (2007), Age of Love (2007, 8 episodes), I Can Make You Thin with Paul McKenna (2008, 5 episodes), Groomer Has It (2008, 13 episodes), and Opportunity Knocks (2008, 13 episodes). He also composed music for the series Parental Control (2009, 4 episodes) and Make It or Break It (2009, 8 episodes).

=== 2010s: Recent activity ===
Carrion composed music for the short film Taking the Stage (2010) and wrote and performed the song "Tear Down the Walls" for Item 47 (2012), one of the Marvel One-Shots series of short films. In 2012 he returned to performing and making records, starting his own Americana group, Doug C and the Blacklisted, who have released several EPs. He describes the band as being "for folks who like Hank Williams Sr. but also have an understanding of Elvis, Black Flag, and The Cramps." He participated in the making of the 2013 documentary Filmage: The Story of Descendents/All, in which he is featured in interview footage discussing his time with the Descendents.

== Discography ==
Year	Artist	Title	Role
	Con 800	Demo	bass guitar
	Anti	Demo	bass guitar
1986	Descendents	Enjoy!	bass guitar
1986	Doggy Style	The Last Laugh	bass guitar; vocals on "Sweater"
1987	Dag Nasty	Wig Out at Denko's	bass guitar
1987	Dag Nasty	All Ages Show	bass guitar
1988	Dag Nasty	Field Day	bass guitar
1988	Dag Nasty	Trouble Is	bass guitar
1990	Pale	"And Shed Her Skin" / "Reunion"	bass guitar, vocals
1991	Pale	Tantrum	bass guitar, vocals
1992	Ultrahead	Cementruck	producer
1993	For Love Not Lisa	Merge	bass guitar, producer, engineer
1993	For Love Not Lisa	Softhand	bass guitar, producer, engineer
1994	For Love Not Lisa	"Good Intentions" / "Hallowed Be"	bass guitar
1994	Roxy Saint	The Most Famous Bands You've Never Heard Of, Vol. 2	backing vocals on "Zombie"
1994	Ultrahead	Definition: Aggro	guitar, vocals, producer
1995	Humble Gods	Humble Gods	guitar
1996	Humble Gods	No Heroes	guitar
2000	Six Degrees of Right	Demo	vocals
2000	Kottonmouth Kings	High Society	guitar on "Peace Not Greed"
2001	Kottonmouth Kings	Hidden Stash II: The Kream of the Krop	guitar
2002	Kottonmouth Kings	Rollin' Stoned	guitar, bass guitar
2003	Tsunami Brothers	King Harbor	guitar
2004	Humble Gods	Born Free	guitar, bass guitar, vocals, producer
2004	Kottonmouth Kings	Fire It Up	guitar, bass guitar
2004	Daddy X	Organic Soul	guitar, bass guitar, Vox organ, vocals, producer
2005	Kottonmouth Kings	Kottonmouth Kings	guitar, bass guitar
2006	Daddy X	Family Ties	guitar

== Film credits ==
Year	Title	Role
2004	F**k The Bull-s**t - The Taxman Movie	actor (mob boss)
2006	The Still Life	actor (security guard); composer (with Joel Miller) and performer (with Adrian Young) of "Blindly Searching", "Down the Road", "Feeling Blue", "Fuck Happiness", and "Strapped Down"
2007	American Pie Presents: Beta House	composer and performer of "Everything Is Gonna Be OK"
2008	Celebrity Art Show	composer
2010	Taking the Stage	composer
2012	Item 47	composer and performer of "Tear Down the Walls"
2013	Filmage	interview subject

== Television credits ==
Year	Title	Role
2005	Last Laugh '05	composer
2005–06	Beauty and the Geek	music editor (9 episodes)
2006	The Biggest Loser	music editor (41 episodes)
2006	7 Day Switch	music editor
2006–07	Identity	music editor (12 episodes)
2007	Science of Love	music editor
2007	Age of Love	music editor (8 episodes)
2008	I Can Make You Thin with Paul McKenna	music editor (5 episodes)
2008	Groomer Has It	music editor (13 episodes)
2008	Opportunity Knocks	music editor (13 episodes)
2009	Parental Control	composer (4 episodes)
2009	Make It or Break It	composer (8 episodes)
