= High Society (Kottonmouth Kings album) =

Studio album by Kottonmouth Kings
- Released: June 27, 2000
- Recorded: 1999–2000
- Genre: Hip hop
- Length: 1:17:46
- Labels: Suburban Noize; Capitol
- Producers: Daddy X (also exec.); Mike Kumagai; Eric "E-Man" Adger

Kottonmouth Kings chronology
Royal Highness (1998)	High Society (2000)	Hidden Stash II: The Kream of the Krop (2001)

Professional ratings
Review scores
Source	Rating
AllMusic	2.5/5 stars
Robert Christgau	(dud)
Rolling Stone	3/5 stars

High Society is the second studio album by American hip hop group Kottonmouth Kings. It was released June 27, 2000, via Suburban Noize/Capitol Records. The album was produced by member Daddy X, who also served as executive producer, Mike Kumagai, and Phil Kaffel, except for one track, "King's Blend", which was produced by Eric "E-Man" Adger. It features guest appearances from Dog Boy, Corporate Avenger, Grand Vanacular, Insane Clown Posse, Sen Dog, T.S.O.L., and Sky Blue.

The album peaked at number 65 on the Billboard 200 chart in the United States. The song "Peace Not Greed" peaked at number 37 on the Hot Modern Rock Tracks chart, with its accompanying music video being featured on MTV's Total Request Live as a 'Close Call'. The song "Crucial" along with a short FMV were included in the PS1 game T.J. Lavin's Ultimate BMX.

== Track listing ==
No.	Title	Writer(s)	Length
1.	"Kona Gold Greeting"	Brad Xavier; Dustin Miller; Timothy McNutt	0:16
2.	"Here We Go Again (Bump 2000)" (featuring Dog Boy)	B. Xavier; Miller; McNutt; Robert Rogers	4:21
3.	"First Class"	B. Xavier; Miller; McNutt	3:28
4.	"Day Dreamin' Fazes"	B. Xavier; Miller; McNutt	3:59
5.	"The Joint"	B. Xavier; Miller; McNutt	4:36
6.	"Good as Gold"	B. Xavier; Miller; McNutt	3:55
7.	"Face Facts" (featuring Dog Boy)	B. Xavier; Miller; McNutt; Rogers; Steven Thronson	5:08
8.	"Peace Not Greed" (featuring Jack Grisham and Corporate Avenger)	B. Xavier; Miller; McNutt; Francis "Spike" Xavier; T.S.O.L.	4:56
9.	"The Lottery"	B. Xavier; Miller; McNutt	4:35
10.	"Round & Round"	B. Xavier; Miller; McNutt	3:26
11.	"King's Blend"	B. Xavier; Miller; McNutt; Eric "E-Man" Adger	4:02
12.	"Anarchy Through Capitalism" (featuring Corporate Avenger)	B. Xavier; Miller; McNutt	0:37
13.	"We the People" (featuring Sen Dog, Dog Boy and Corporate Avenger)	B. Xavier; Miller; McNutt; Senen Reyes; Rogers	5:47
14.	"Elevated Sounds"	B. Xavier; Miller; McNutt	4:23
15.	"Un Xplanetory"	B. Xavier; Miller; McNutt	5:11
16.	"Wickit Klowns" (featuring Insane Clown Posse and Dog Boy)	B. Xavier; Miller; McNutt; Rogers	4:33
17.	"Coffee Shop"	B. Xavier; Miller; McNutt	4:45
18.	"Size Of An Ant" (featuring Grand Vanacular and Sky Blue)	B. Xavier; Miller; McNutt; Robert Adams; Jason Redburn; Bill Wadsworth	3:45
19.	"Crucial" (featuring Dog Boy)	B. Xavier; Miller; McNutt; Rogers	4:35
20.	"B-Dubb's Blend"	B. Xavier; Miller; McNutt	1:30
Total length:			1:17:46

The Lottery Remixes Best Buy bonus disc
No.	Title	Length
1.	"The Lottery" (Stackin' Chips Remix)	5:01
2.	"The Lottery" (E-Swift Remix)	5:00
3.	"Lady Killer" (featuring Johnny Richter)	3:05
4.	"The Lottery" (E-Swift Remix - Instrumental)	5:00

== Personnel ==
- Brad "Daddy X" Xavier – lyrics, vocals, producer, executive producer
- Dustin "D-Loc" Miller – lyrics, vocals
- Timothy "Johnny Richter" McNutt – lyrics, vocals
- Robert "DJ Bobby B" Adams – scratches
- Robert "Dog Boy" Rogers – vocals (tracks: 2, 7, 13, 16, 19)
- Jack Grisham – vocals (track 8)
- Corporate Avenger – voice (tracks: 8, 12, 13)
- Senen "Sen Dog" Reyes – rap vocals (track 13)
- Joseph "Violent J" Bruce – rap vocals (track 16)
- Joseph "Shaggy 2 Dope" Ultser – rap vocals (track 16)
- Jason "Grand Vanacular" Redburn – rap vocals (track 18)
- Sky Blue Xavier – backing vocals (track 18)
- Doug Carrion – guitar (track 8)
- Bill Wadsworth – guitar (track 15), artwork
- Mike Kumagai – producer
- Eric "E-Man" Adger – producer (track 11)
- Phil Kaffel – co-producer, engineering, mixing
- Patrick Shevelin – Pro-Tools, engineering assistant
- Tom Baker – mastering
- Carter Gibbs – artwork
- Fabrice Henssens – photography

== Charts ==
Chart (2000)	Peak position
US Billboard 200	65
