= For Love Not Lisa =

American hard rock band

- Origin: Oklahoma City, Oklahoma, U.S.
- Genres: Hard rock; post-hardcore; post-grunge
- Years active: 1990–1996
- Labels: Indivision; East West; Tooth & Nail; Theologian
- Past members: Mike Lewis; Mike Miles; Aaron Preston; Clint McBay; Doug Carrion; Kevin Jeffries; Eric Myers; Ahren Burns; Kent Euing; Mat Hilbun

For Love Not Lisa was an American hard rock band from Oklahoma City, Oklahoma, formed in 1990. They were signed to the major label East West Records. They released two albums in the 1990s before disbanding in 1996.

== History ==
For Love Not Lisa was formed in 1990 by guitarist/vocalist Mike Miles (who previously played in Brave New World) and bassist Mat Hilbun. They recruited their acquaintance Mike Lewis as vocalist/guitarist, who had played in the band Mona Lisa Overdrive. Kent Euing, Lewis' bandmate in Mona Lisa Overdrive, joined For Love Not Lisa on drums to round out the original lineup for their early shows in the Oklahoma City region. They served as openers for Chainsaw Kittens and Fugazi during their first few shows. In 1991, the band were unable to obtain a label deal in their hometown, and thus they moved to Los Angeles. Prior to the move, Ahren Burns (Lewis' long-time friend and then-roommate) replaced Hilbun on bass and Eric Myers (Miles' former bandmate in Brave New World who was already living in Los Angeles by then) replaced Euing on drums. Shortly after moving to Los Angeles, personality differences led Burns to leave the band. Another former member of Brave New World, Kevin Jeffries, joined the band on bass as a result. The lineup of Miles, Lewis, Myers, and Jeffries released a demo, For Love Not Lisa, in 1992. It contained four live songs and four studio songs. Their first major tour was as an opener for Rage Against the Machine.

After playing in Los Angeles for about four months, the band received numerous label offers, and they ultimately signed to East West Records. Around the same time, another lineup shift happened, as Aaron Preston (from the band Chainsaw Kittens) replaced Myers on drums. In addition, midway through recording their album, Jeffries left the band and was replaced on bass by Doug Carrion (who was already co-producing the album in the studio along with Matt Hyde). Carrion was previously known for being in the bands Dag Nasty and Descendents. The band released their debut album, Merge, in 1993. The songs "Softhand" and "Slip Slide Melting" were released as the album's singles. Both singles contained a cover of the Kiss song "Rocket Ride", and featured original songwriter Ace Frehley on vocals and guitars as a guest appearance. In late 1993, For Love Not Lisa toured alongside Prong and Bad Brains in the US.

In 1994, "Slip Slide Melting" was included on the soundtrack for The Crow. A music video that intertwined scenes from the film with shots of the band was created as well, and it had found occasional play on MTV's Headbangers Ball. The Crow was a mainstream success, as the soundtrack sold over 3 million copies in the US, and it was eventually certified 3× Platinum by the RIAA. Later in 1994, Carrion experienced difficulties while touring for Merge and then left the band. He was replaced by Clint McBay, who previously played with Preston in Chainsaw Kittens. That same year, the band co-headlined a tour of the US with Drown. The band then started to work on their second album, Information Superdriveway. Produced by Steven Haigler, it was released in September 1995, with the singles "Had a Lover" and "Good Intentions". The band self-funded a music video for "Coming Into Focus", but the record label ultimately refused to promote it as a single. The album failed to meet sales expectations. The band placed some of the blame on the label for neglecting to promote it. Shortly after the album's release, the label broke away from its parent, Atlantic Records, and started to operate closely under Elektra Records. Elektra was known for its numerous internal shifts and also for neglecting the artists' marketing. In 1996, For Love Not Lisa formally disbanded.

Lewis, Preston, and McBay formed the Christian rock band Puller, who signed to Tooth & Nail Records. Preston left Puller before they released their debut album and McBay eventually quit as well. At the end of the 1990s, Miles reunited with Lewis as he joined Puller too. In 1999, while Puller was still signed to Tooth & Nail, the label released The Lost Elephant, a compilation that contained songs from For Love Not Lisa's earliest demo and alternate versions of select songs, along with a few unreleased tracks.

In the 2000s, Carrion would compose for numerous television shows, such as The Biggest Loser and Make It or Break It. He would also work closely with Kottonmouth Kings on their studio albums, and with rapper Daddy X on his solo releases. Along with Bruce Fitzhugh, Lewis created a company named Zambooie that specialized in online merchandise for bands. Lewis also continued to front the band Puller for a number of years, being the band's only constant member. Along with joining Puller, Miles also formed a band named Echo Division in 2005. Preston and McBay went on to form the band Dead Girlfriend after both had left Puller. McBay later went on to become a freelance editor. In 2007, Lewis, Miles, and McBay attempted to reconvene in the studio to create new songs and to prepare for a few reunion gigs as For Love Not Lisa; however, neither plan fully materialized. Lewis and McBay eventually formed the southern rock band Tenkiller in the 2020s. Their debut album, Burn the Boats, was released in 2025.

In August 2025, Lewis, Miles, McBay, and Davey Latter (former drummer of Stanford Prison Experiment) digitally released a re-recorded version of "Slip Slide Melting".

== Members ==
Final

- Mike Lewis – vocals, guitar (1990–1996)
- Mike Miles – guitar, vocals (1990–1996)
- Aaron Preston – drums (1992–1996)
- Clint McBay – bass (1994–1996)

Former

- Mat Hilbun – bass (1990–1991)
- Kent Euing – drums (1990–1991)
- Ahren Burns – bass (1991)
- Eric Myers – drums (1991–1992)
- Kevin Jeffries – bass (1991–1993)
- Doug Carrion – bass (1993–1994)

== Discography ==
=== Albums ===
- Merge, 1993 (East West Records/Atlantic)
- Information Superdriveway, 1995 (East West Records)

=== Compilations ===
- The Lost Elephant, 1999 (Tooth & Nail Records)

=== EPs/Singles ===
- For Love Not Lisa EP, 1992 (Indivision)
- "Softhand" single, 1992 (Theologian Records)
- "Softhand" single, 1993 (East West Records)
- "Slip Slide Melting" single, 1994 (East West Records)
- "Good Intentions" single, 1994 (Theologian Records)
- "Had a Lover" single, 1995 (East West Records)
