= The Green Album (Kottonmouth Kings album) =

Studio album by Kottonmouth Kings
- Released: October 28, 2008
- Recorded: 2007–08
- Genre: Rap rock
- Length: 1:17:38
- Label: Suburban Noize Records
- Producer: Daddy X; Mike Kumagai; P-Nice

Kottonmouth Kings chronology
Cloud Nine (2007)	The Green Album (2008)	Long Live The Kings (2010)

Professional ratings
Review scores
Source	Rating
AllMusic	2.5/5 stars
RapReviews	7/10

The Green Album is the ninth studio album by American rap rock group Kottonmouth Kings. It was released on October 28, 2008 via Suburban Noize Records. Production was handled by Mike Kumagai, P-Nice, and member Daddy X, who also served as executive producer together with Kevin Zinger. It features guest appearances from BJ Smith, Brother J, Tech N9NE, Sky Blue and The Dirtball, as well as contributions from Ryan Fatal, Eddie Tatar, Joe Tatar, Aaron Abeyta, Ronnie King, P Bass and Ernie Longoria.

The album peaked at number 42 on the Billboard 200, number 5 on the Top Rap Albums, number 13 on the Top Rock Albums, and topped the Independent Albums chart in the United States.

As of August 1, 2012 The Green Album has sold over 325,000 copies in the US. AllMusic reviewer David Jeffries wrote that "If you haven't figured it out from the album's title, the song titles, or even the band's name, The Green Album is a pro-weed album from aging cottage industry insiders known as the Kottonmouth Kings. [...] [The album] finds them a bit more out of touch with what's happening in the rest of the music world".

== Track listing ==
No.	Title	Length
1.	"Legacy"	0:33
2.	"Blaze of Glory" (featuring BJ Smith)	4:00
3.	"Rock Like Us"	3:43
4.	"Trippin" (featuring BJ Smith)	3:33
5.	"Pack Your Bowls"	3:49
6.	"K.O.T.T.O.N.M.O.U.T.H. Song"	4:21
7.	"Don't Give a Fuck"	3:20
8.	"Happy" (featuring BJ Smith)	3:23
9.	"Where I'm Going?"	4:13
10.	"Puff N Tuff"	4:23
11.	"Stand"	3:39
12.	"Super Hero" (featuring Sky Blue)	3:49
13.	"Freeworld" (featuring Brother J)	5:56
14.	"What U in 4" (featuring BJ Smith)	4:10
15.	"Sex Toy" (featuring Tech N9NE and BJ Smith)	5:12
16.	"Rainfall"	4:04
17.	"So Cal"	2:06
18.	"Green Grass" (featuring The Dirtball)	4:34
19.	"Time"	4:21
20.	"Plant a Seed"	4:29
Total length:		1:17:38

Best Buy bonus tracks
No.	Title	Length
21.	"High Hopes" (performed by Kottonmouth Kings)	4:27
22.	"Take A Ride" (performed by D-Loc and Judge D)	3:49
23.	"Spark It Up" (performed by Kottonmouth Kings)	3:13
24.	"Problem Addict" (performed by Kottonmouth Kings and Tech N9NE)	3:14
25.	"Miss Smokey" (performed by Kingspade)	3:48
26.	"Bubblin" (performed by Kottonmouth Kings)	2:45
27.	"Stoner Bitch" (performed by Potluck and Kottonmouth Kings)	4:35
28.	"High Fidelity" (performed by Daddy X)	2:25
29.	"Had Enough" (performed by Kottonmouth Kings)	1:39
30.	"All Hooked On Something" (performed by Kottonmouth Kings)	3:59
31.	"Inhale To The Chief" (performed by Pakelika)	4:18

== Personnel ==
Kottonmouth Kings

- Brad "Daddy X" Xavier – vocals, producer, executive producer, liner notes
- Dustin "D-Loc" Miller – vocals
- Timothy "Johnny Richter" McNutt – vocals
- Luiz "Lou Dog" Gaez – drums
- Robert "DJ Bobby B" Adams – turntables
- Patrick "Pakelika" Cochrun – performer

Guest musicians

- BJ Smith – vocals (tracks: 2, 4, 8, 14, 15)
- Ryan Fatal – guitar (tracks: 5, 9, 11, 13)
- Eddie Tatar – guitar & bass (tracks: 12, 17)
- Joey Tatar – drums (tracks: 12, 17)
- Sky Blue Xavier – vocals (track 12)
- Jason "Brother J" Hunter – vocals (track 13)
- Aaron "Tech N9NE" Yates – vocals (track 15)
- David "The Dirtball" Alexander – vocals (track 18)
- Aaron "El Hefe" Abeyta – guitar (track 20)
- Cornelius Van Sprang – keyboards (track 20)
- P. Bass Jones – bass (track 20)
- Ernesto de Longoria – drums (track 20)

Production

- Michael Kumagai – producer, mixing, engineering
- Patrick Shevelin – producer, mixing, engineering
- Tom Baker – mastering
- Kevin Zinger – executive producer, management

Visual

- Casey Quintal – art direction, design
- Ricky Gaez – design
- Devin DeHaven – photography
- Dan Skye – photography
- Brian Pratt – illustration

Additional

- Ivory Daniel – management
- Ron Opaleski – booking

== Charts ==
Chart (2008)	Peak position
US Billboard 200	42
US Independent Albums (Billboard)	1
US Top Alternative Albums (Billboard)	10
US Top Rap Albums (Billboard)	5
US Top Rock Albums (Billboard)	13
