= Nervous System (album) =

2011 studio album by the Dirtball of the Kottonmouth Kings

Studio album by The Dirtball
- Released: March 1, 2011
- Genre: Hip hop
- Length: 1:07:02
- Label: Suburban Noize Records
- Producer: Kevin Zinger (exec.); Brad Xavier (exec.); The Dirtball (exec.); Chromatix; Mike Kumagai; Seven

The Dirtball chronology
Crook County (2008)	Nervous System (2011)	Skull Hollow (2019)

Professional ratings
Review scores
Source	Rating
AllMusic	3.5/5 stars
RapReviews	6.5/10
Spectrum Culture	1.8/5

Nervous System is the fifth solo studio album by American rapper David "The Dirtball" Alexander of the Kottonmouth Kings. It was released on March 1, 2011 via Suburban Noize Records. The album features guest appearances from Daddy X and Johnny Richter of KMK, Big B of OPM, and Blaze Ya Dead Homie.

== Track listing ==
No.	Title	Length
1.	"Intro"	0:42
2.	"I Came to Party"	2:33
3.	"Way We Live"	3:00
4.	"Cracka' Now"	2:54
5.	"Bang Loud"	2:29
6.	"Anybody"	3:01
7.	"Move Back"	3:08
8.	"Own It"	2:27
9.	"Let 'Em Roll"	3:00
10.	"I Smell Hell"	3:26
11.	"Let's Do It" (featuring Daddy X)	4:36
12.	"Mushrooms"	4:08
13.	"Overdose"	3:19
14.	"Long Road"	3:59
15.	"Fuck Off" (Skit)	0:40
16.	"Party Parade"	3:18
17.	"Friends Past"	3:14
18.	"The Paper" (featuring Blaze Ya Dead Homie)	3:41
19.	"Karma Bite" (featuring Big B)	2:22
20.	"Spill Zone" (featuring Johnny Richter)	3:35
21.	"No Cops"	3:02
22.	"Rule the World"	3:56
23.	"Outro"	0:32
Total length:		1:07:02

== Chart history ==
Chart (2011)	Peak position
US Top R&B/Hip-Hop Albums (Billboard)	47
US Top Rap Albums (Billboard)	23
US Independent Albums (Billboard)	47
