= The Kottonmouth Xperience Vol. II: Kosmic Therapy =

The Kottonmouth Xperience II: Cosmic Kosmic Therapy

Remix album by Kottonmouth Kings
- Released: April 15, 2008
- Recorded: 2008
- Genre: Drum and bass; breakbeat; ambient; dub
- Label: Capitol; Suburban Noize Records

Kottonmouth Kings chronology
Greatest Highs (2008)	The Kottonmouth Xperience II: Cosmic Kosmic Therapy (2008)	The Green Album (2008)

Professional ratings
Review scores
Source	Rating
Allmusic	3/5 stars

The Kottonmouth Xperience Vol. II: Kosmic Therapy is a 2-disc CD/DVD combo of remixed classic Kottonmouth Kings tracks.

== Track listing ==
1. Intro - 0:57
2. Echoes and Spirit Guides - 3:10
3. Super Duper High - 5:05
4. Growin Ganja - 3:09
5. Keep Smilin - 3:51
6. New Weed Order - 3:27
7. Smoked Out - 3:54
8. Down That Road - 3:31
9. Somewhere Between Nowhere - 4:40
10. Sunsplash - 2:51
11. Radical Habits - 2:48
12. Still Ballin - 3:53
13. Dragon Slayer - 2:53
14. Ride Or Die - 3:24
15. Freedom Time - 4:00
16. Krazy Train - 2:47
17. Stoner Dub - 5:22

Release Date: July 2, 2008

== Chart positions ==
Chart (2008)	Peak position
U.S. Billboard Independent Albums	45
