= Ghetto Guide =

Studio album by Saint Dog
- Released: February 24, 2004
- Recorded: 2003
- Genre: Rap
- Label: Suburban Noize Records
- Producer: The Ringleaders; Mellow Man Ace; Saint Dog

Saint Dog chronology
Ghetto Guide (2004)	USA (Unconformable Social Amputees) (2006)

Ghetto Guide is the debut solo album of rapper Saint Dog released on February 24, 2004, with Suburban Noize Records.

== Track listing ==
#	Title	Guest artist	Time
1	"Intro"		0:33
2	"SoCal Thugsta"		3:59
3	"Summertime"		3:43
4	"Big West Coastin'"		3:41
5	"Ghetto Guide"		4:25
6	"People Into Making Progress"	Big Hoss and Daddy X	5:26
7	"I'm In The Band"	The Ripperside Kids	4:02
8	"Money Talks"		4:09
9	"Now I Lay Me"		4:22
10	"Fight"	Big Hoss	3:21
11	"Breaking The Glass"	Mellow Man Ace	3:37
12	"Starts Bangin"		3:49
13	"F**k Five-O"		3:45
14	"First Class White Trash"	Big Hoss	3:51
15	"Rock Star Roadie"		3:08
16	"At The End Of The Day"	Big Hoss	4:43
17	"Crime 2 Rhyme"	The JTS	3:51
18	"U.S.A. Anthem"	Big Hoss	4:07

== Personnel ==
- Little Brother (bass guitar)
- Mark Twang (guitars)
