= Hidden Stash II: The Kream of the Krop =

Studio album by Kottonmouth Kings
- Released: October 9, 2001
- Recorded: 2001
- Studio: 211 Hip-Hop Shack; Electric Ghetto Studios; The Green Room (Los Angeles, CA); The Jungle Room
- Genre: Rap rock
- Length: 1:09:48
- Label: Suburban Noize; Capitol
- Producer: Daddy X (also exec.); DJ Bobby B; D-Loc; Michael Kumagai

Kottonmouth Kings chronology
High Society (2000)	Hidden Stash II: The Kream of the Krop (2001)	Rollin' Stoned (2002)

Professional ratings
Review scores
Source	Rating
AllMusic	2.5/5 stars

Hidden Stash II: The Kream of the Krop is the third studio album by American rap rock group Kottonmouth Kings. It was released on October 9, 2001 via Suburban Noize/Capitol Records. Recording sessions took place at DJ Bobby B's 211 Hip-Hop Shack, Electric Ghetto Studios, The Green Room in Los Angeles and The Jungle Room. Production was handled by members Daddy X, who also served as executive producer, DJ Bobby B and D-Loc, as well as Mike Kumagai and Dog Boy. It features guest appearances from Dog Boy and Judge D.

The album peaked at number 100 on the Billboard 200.

While the album title refers to Hidden Stash, the KMK's post-Royal Highness collection of b-sides, rarities, and remixes, the album itself is a regular studio album. The only song on Hidden Stash, Vol. 2 that had been previously released was "My Mind's Playin' Tricks on Me", a Geto Boys cover version that was recorded for the compilation album Take A Bite Outta Rhyme.

On September 15, 2009, Hidden Stash II was re-issued with the Dopeumentary DVD as Double Dose V3, the third and final double dose set.

== Track listing ==
No.	Title	Writer(s)	Producer(s)	Length
1.	"Intro"	Robert Adams		1:46
2.	"Killa Kali" (featuring Judge D)	Brad Xavier; Dustin Miller; Timothy McNutt; Daniel Rogers; Michael Kumagai	Daddy X; Mike Kumagai	4:19
3.	"Welcome to the Suburbs"	Xavier; Miller; McNutt; Kumagai	Daddy X; Mike Kumagai	3:41
4.	"Tell Me Why"	Xavier; Miller; McNutt; Robert Rogers; Kumagai	Daddy X; Mike Kumagai	4:14
5.	"Dying Daze"	Xavier; Miller; McNutt; Doug Carrion; Kumagai	Daddy X; Mike Kumagai	3:32
6.	"Life Rolls On"	Xavier; Miller; McNutt; Kumagai	Daddy X; Mike Kumagai	3:57
7.	"Paid Vacation"	Xavier; Miller; McNutt; Kumagai	Daddy X; Mike Kumagai	4:04
8.	"Things I Do"	McNutt; Adams	DJ Bobby B	3:42
9.	"Bi-Polar"	Xavier; Miller; McNutt; Carrion; Ricky Gaez	Daddy X	3:04
10.	"New Destination"	Xavier; Miller; McNutt; Kumagai	Daddy X; Mike Kumagai	6:10
11.	"Brain on Drugs (Interlude)"	Miller	D-Loc	1:05
12.	"All About the Weed"	Xavier; Miller; McNutt; Rogers; Kumagai	Daddy X; Mike Kumagai	4:21
13.	"Family Trees"	Xavier; Miller; McNutt; Kumagai	Daddy X; Mike Kumagai	4:16
14.	"On the Run"	Xavier; Miller; McNutt; Rogers; Adams	Dog Boy; DJ Bobby B	4:17
15.	"My Mind Playin' Tricks on Me"	Brad Jordan; Doug King; William Dennis	Daddy X; Mike Kumagai	5:20
16.	"Grow Room Jam"	Xavier; Miller; McNutt	Daddy X	12:00
Total length:				1:09:48

== Personnel ==
- Brad "Daddy X" Xavier – vocals (tracks: 2–7, 9, 10, 12–14, 16), producer (tracks: 2–7, 9, 10, 12, 13, 15, 16), executive producer
- Dustin "D-Loc" Miller – vocals (tracks: 2–7, 9–14, 16), scratches & producer (track 11)
- Timothy "Johnny Richter" McNutt – vocals (tracks: 2–10, 12–14, 16)
- Robert "DJ Bobby B" Adams – producer (tracks: 8, 14), recording (track 1)
- Daniel "The Judge" Rogers – vocals (tracks: 2, 5)
- Adam "Lazy Dread" Gonzalez – bass (track 14)
- Mike Kumagai – producer (tracks: 2–7, 10, 12, 13, 15), mixing (tracks: 2–7, 10, 13, 15), engineering (tracks: 3, 7, 10)
- Robert "Dogboy" Rogers – producer (track 14)
- Patrick Shevelin – mixing (tracks: 8, 9, 12, 14, 16), engineering (tracks: 5, 8, 9, 12, 14, 16)
- Tom Baker – mastering
- Rob Sturtcman – artwork

== Charts ==
Chart (2001)	Peak position
US Billboard 200	100
