= Joint Venture (album) =

Compilation album by Kottonmouth Kings
- Released: November 15, 2005
- Genres: Rap rock; reggae
- Length: 1:15:31
- Label: Suburban Noize
- Producers: Daddy X; Mike Kumagai

Kottonmouth Kings chronology
Kottonmouth Kings (2005)	Joint Venture (2005)	Nickel Bag (2006)

Professional ratings
Review scores
Source	Rating
411Mania	8/10
AllMusic	3/5 stars

Joint Venture is a compilation album by American rap rock group Kottonmouth Kings. It was released on November 15, 2005 via Suburban Noize Records. Production was handled by Mike Kumagai and Daddy X. The album includes a bonus DVD of 28 music videos.

The compilation contains new KMK songs and remixes, as well as Daddy X solo tracks, Kingspade tracks, and a song by related group called One Session. It also features guest appearances from Dogboy, Cypress Hill, Judge D and Tech N9NE.

In the United States, the album peaked at number 193 on the Billboard 200 and number 13 on the Independent Albums charts.

== Track listing ==
No.	Title	Length
1.	"I'm Hungry"	3:34
2.	"Why Oh Why"	3:43
3.	"SRH"	3:57
4.	"Radio Head"	4:40
5.	"In God We Trust" (featuring Dog Boy)	4:34
6.	"Better Daze"	2:58
7.	"Put It Down (Vaporized Remix)" (featuring Cypress Hill)	4:38
8.	"It's Still a Dogs Life" (featuring Dog Boy)	3:34
9.	"Kingspade"	0:53
10.	"We Back"	3:48
11.	"The Game"	3:40
12.	"Daddy X"	0:25
13.	"Power, Greed, Lies & Money" (featuring Judge D)	3:13
14.	"U Are Everything"	3:44
15.	"Flip the Script Remixes"	0:26
16.	"Bottoms Up (Last Call Remix)"	3:39
17.	"Bad Habits (Rehab Remix)"	4:10
18.	"Fuck the Industry 2 (Let 'Em Know Remix)" (featuring Tech N9NE)	3:39
19.	"Fire It Up (Smoked Out Remix)"	4:09
20.	"Rip the Night Away (Sunrise Reprise Remix)"	3:40
21.	"DJ Bobby B Presents "One Session""	0:30
22.	"Get Cash"	4:04
23.	"Live Today (Revival Mix)"	3:53
Total length:		1:15:31

Japan version bonus track
No.	Title	Length
24.	"Peace of Mind (Dub Remix)"

Bonus DVD
No.	Title	Length
25.	"King Klick"
26.	"Put It Down"
27.	"Peace Of Mind"
28.	"Bring It On"
29.	"Bad Habits"
30.	"Subnoize Ratz"
31.	"Peace Pipe"
32.	"Sleepers"
33.	"Outcast"
34.	"Positive Vibes"
35.	"Peace Not Greed"
36.	"Full Throttle"
37.	"Strange Daze"
38.	"The Lottery"
39.	"Day Dreamin Fazes"
40.	"Zen State"
41.	"Kings Blend"
42.	"Enjoy"
43.	"Angry Youth"
44.	"Ur Done"
45.	"Endless Highway"
46.	"Rest Of My Life"
47.	"Zero Tolerance"
48.	"Bump"
49.	"Suburban Life"
50.	"Dogs Life"
51.	"Dying Daze"
52.	"Make It Hot"

== Charts ==
Chart (2005)	Peak position
US Billboard 200	193
US Independent Albums (Billboard)	13
