= Doggy Style (band) =

American punk rock band

- Origin: Placentia, California
- Genres: Punk rock
- Years active: 1983–1988; 2009–present
- Labels: Cleopatra Records Flipside Records, Mystic Records, Triple X Records
- Members: Tim Fyke (vocals); Ed "Shaggy" Caudill (lead guitar); Danny Staggs (rhythm guitar); Mark Tolbert (rhythm guitar); Eric Vedder (bass guitar); Rob Chocek (drums)
- Past members: Brad "Daddy X" Xavier (vocals); Ray "La Pulga" Jimenez AKA "Ray Beez" (bass guitar); Doug Carrion (bass guitar); Lou "Lou Dog" Guyez (drums); Mark Tolbert (vocals); Rib Finley (vocals) (deceased); BDUB (drums); Greg Jones (rhythm guitar); Bosco (guitar); Warren Fitzgerald (guitar)
- Website: Official Page

Doggy Style is a punk rock band from Placentia, California, and was part of the North Orange County punk rock scene that included bands from the surrounding cities of Fullerton and Anaheim that formed in 1983. Daddy X of the Kottonmouth Kings, and co-founder of Suburban Noize Records, was the original vocalist, and creator of the band. Their debut EP Work As One was released on a 7" record, on Mystic Records.

== About Doggy Style/members ==
Doggy Style started with original singer Brad Xavier, Ed "Shaggy" Caudill, Ray Jimenez, and Lou Gaez. Their first release was their 1984 EP Work as One, on Mystic Records included the song "Donut Shop Rock". Brad only did vocals for two other releases, Side by Side in 1985 and Live at Sun City in 1986 both on Flipside Records. The original Doggy Style lasted from 1983 to 1986, at which point they split into two factions, both using the name Doggy Style.

Brad Xavier and Lou Gaez formed a new lineup with Brian Baker, recently departed from Dag Nasty, and Doug Carrion, recently departed from Descendents, and released The Last Laugh on National Trust Records. Shortly after its release, Brian and Doug left the band to reform Dag Nasty. Brad and Lou recruited Warren Fitzgerald and Danny Wallis of Don't No and Eric VonArab of Love Canal to fill the void left by Baker and Carrion. Brad and Lou would continue to work together on projects including Doggy Rock, Double Freak, Humble Gods, and Kottonmouth Kings.

In 1987 Doggy Style appeared on the compilation record Rat Music for Rat People Vol. III, recorded by producer Sylvia Massy at San Francisco's CD Presents.

Ed and Ray carried on with new members, Danny Johnston on drums, Hedge (D.I. and HVY-DRT) on second guitar, Mark Tolbert and Rib Finley on vocals as Doggy Style from 1987 to 1988. This line-up recorded the Doggy Style II LP originally released on Flipside Records. John "Bosco" Callabero (also of D.I.) eventually replaced Ed and released, Don't Hit Me Up in 1988 on Triple X Records.

After both Hedge and John "Bosco" Callabero left the band Rib Filey, Danny Johnston and Ray Beez tried to continue on with Frank Agnew of the Adolescents. However, this line-up was short lived and the band eventually fall apart.

Doggy Style reformed in 2009 with, Tim Fyke (vocals); Ed "Shaggy" Caudill (lead guitar); Danny Staggs (rhythm guitar); Mark Tolbert (rhythm guitar); Eric Vedder (bass guitar); Rob Chocek (drums).

== Members ==
=== Current members ===
- Tim Fyke – vocals
- Ed "Shaggy" Caudill – lead guitar
- Danny Staggs – rhythm guitar
- Mark Tolbert – rhythm guitar
- Eric Vedder – bass guitar
- Joey Ruffino – drums

=== Former members ===
- Brad "Daddy X" Xavier – vocals
- Ray "La Pulga" Jimenez AKA Ray Beez – bass guitar
- Lou "Lou Dog" Gaez – drums
- Mark Tolbert – vocals
- Rib Finley – vocals
- Danny Johnston – drums
- Greg Jones – rhythm guitar
- Bosco – guitar
- B DUB – drums
- Hedge – guitar
- Brian Baker – guitar
- Doug Carrion – bass
- Eric VonArab – guitar
- Warren Fitzgerald – guitar
- Danny Wallis – bass

== Discography ==
#	Title	Date	Label
1	Work As One (EP)	1984	Mystic Records
2	Side by Side	1985	Flipside Records
3	Live at Sun City	1986	Flipside Records
4	Doggy Style II	1987	Flipside Records
5	The Last Laugh	1987	National Trust Records
6	Don't Hit Me Up	1988	Triple X Records
7	Punkers Anthem	2011	Cleopatra Records
8	The Punk Collection 1985–1988	2011	Cleopatra Records

- The CD version of Don't Hit Me Up includes the album Doggy Style II (as a bonus) with purchase.

== Videography ==
Title	Year	Album	Director	Label
"Donut Shop Rock"	1985	Side by Side		Flipside Records
