= Koast II Koast =

Studio album by Kottonmouth Kings
- Released: June 6, 2006
- Recorded: 2006
- Studio: Suburban Noize Compound; Electric Ghetto Studios (Venice Beach, CA)
- Genre: Rap rock
- Length: 1:14:22
- Label: Suburban Noize Records
- Producer: Daddy X; Mike Kumagai

Kottonmouth Kings chronology
Kottonmouth Kings (2005)	Koast II Koast (2006)	Cloud Nine (2007)

Professional ratings
Review scores
Source	Rating
AllMusic	3.5/5 stars
PopMatters	6/10

Koast II Koast is the seventh studio album by American hip hop group Kottonmouth Kings. It was released on June 6, 2006 via Suburban Noize Records. Recording sessions took place at Suburban Noize Compound and at Electric Ghetto Studios in Venice Beach. Production was handled by Mike Kumagai and member Daddy X, who also served as executive producer together with Kevin Zinger. The album peaked at number thirty-nine on the Billboard 200, No. 14 on the Top Rock Albums, No. 19 on the Top Rap Albums, No. 3 on the Independent Albums, No. 39 on both the Top Internet Albums and the Billboard Comprehensive Albums in the United States.

== Track listing ==
No.	Title	Writer(s)	Length
1.	"Where's the Weed At?"	Brad Xavier; Dustin Miller; Timothy McNutt; Michael Kumagai	4:05
2.	"This My Club Song"	Xavier; Miller; McNutt; Kumagai	3:27
3.	"Purple Haze"	Robert Adams	0:35
4.	"Keep It Kali"	Xavier; Miller; McNutt; Kumagai	3:26
5.	"I've Had It"	Xavier; Miller; McNutt; Kumagai	3:25
6.	"Friends"	Xavier; Miller; McNutt; Kumagai	3:42
7.	"Fat Sack"	Adams	0:21
8.	"Everybody Move"	Xavier; Miller; McNutt; Kumagai	3:47
9.	"Bubblin"	Adams	0:29
10.	"Bong Toke"	Xavier; Miller; McNutt; Kumagai	4:16
11.	"Irie Feelin"	Xavier; Miller; McNutt; Kumagai	4:24
12.	"Blueberry"	Adams	0:20
13.	"Neva Stop"	Xavier; Miller; McNutt; Kumagai	4:02
14.	"No Regrets"	Xavier; Miller; McNutt; Kumagai	3:13
15.	"Hustle"	Xavier; Miller; McNutt; Kumagai	3:22
16.	"Smile"	Xavier; Miller; McNutt; Kumagai	3:58
17.	"One 2Da Two"	Adams	0:17
18.	"Do the Math"	Xavier; Miller; McNutt; Kumagai	3:47
19.	"Koast II Koast"	Xavier; Miller; McNutt; Kumagai	4:07
20.	"Party"	Xavier; Miller; McNutt; Kumagai	3:50
21.	"One Too Many Timez"	Xavier; Miller; McNutt; Kumagai	4:15
22.	"Last Chances"	Xavier; Miller; McNutt; Kumagai	4:25
23.	"Forever"	Xavier; Miller; McNutt; Kumagai	4:22
24.	"Subnoize"	Adams	2:27
Total length:			1:14:22

Bonus track
No.	Title	Writer(s)	Length
25.	"Pimpin Lessons"	Xavier; Miller; McNutt; Kumagai	3:25

== Personnel ==
- Brad "Daddy X" Xavier – vocals, producer, executive producer
- Dustin "D-Loc" Miller – vocals
- Timothy "Johnny Richter" McNutt – vocals
- Daniel "Judge D" Rogers – backup vocals, producer, writer
- Robert "DJ Bobby B" Adams – vocals, turntables
- Mike Kumagai – producer, mixing, engineering
- Tom Baker – mastering
- Kevin Zinger – executive producer, management
- Larry Love – artwork
- Jeremy McClure – design
- Barry Underhill – photography
- Patrick Axe – photography
- Ian Montone – legal
- Ron Opaleski – booking

== Charts ==
Chart (2006)	Peak position
US Billboard 200	39
US Top Rock Albums (Billboard)	14
US Top Rap Albums (Billboard)	19
US Independent Albums (Billboard)	3
