= Classic hits (disambiguation) =

Classic hits is a radio format.

Classic hits may also refer to:

== Radio stations and networks ==
- Classic Hits (Ireland), a Dublin-based multi-region radio station
- The Hits (radio station), a New Zealand radio station, formerly called Classic Hits
- Classic Hits/Pop, a music format produced by Westwood One
- Classic Hits 954/1530, later Sunshine 1530, an English radio station
- Pure Gold Network, formerly Classic Hits Network, an Australian radio network

== Television channels ==
- Classic Hits (television channel), a television channel formed by That's Media to replace That's Music on Freeview

== Albums ==
- Classic Hits (John Paul Young album), 1988
- Classic Hits Live, by Kottonmouth Kings, 2003
- Classic Hits Live/Best of Live, by Foreigner, 1993

== See also ==
- Classic Hits of Harry Chapin, a 2003 album
