= Tsunami Brothers =

American hip hop group

- Also known as: Tsunami Bros.
- Origin: Redondo Beach, California, U.S.
- Genres: Hip hop
- Years active: 2003
- Label: Suburban Noize Records
- Members: DJ Bobby B (turntables); DJ Shakey Bonez (drums, turntables) Additional personnel Doug Carrion (guitars); Lou Dog (drums)
- Website: suburbannoizerecords.com/tsunamibros.php

The Tsunami Brothers were an American turntablism duo consisting of DJ Bobby B and DJ Shakey Bonez, who are best known as members of the Kottonmouth Kings.

== Tsunami Bros Creation ==
At soundcheck during Kottonmouth Kings tours the two would jump behind the turntables to pass the time. After numerous tours they decided to take their ideas and record them. Bobby B worked on the scratching along with Bonez who also worked on the drums. From there Bobby B laid down the rest of the production. This resulted in the two inviting all the artists on Suburban Noize, at the time, to come down and record vocals over their beats. Guest vocalists include the vocalists of the Kottonmouth Kings (and Pakelika too), Judge D, Big B, Phunk Junkeez, and Kona Gold.

== Discography ==
King Harbor

Studio album by Tsunami Brothers
- Released: July 22, 2003
- Recorded: 2003
- Genre: Hip hop
- Label: Suburban Noize
- Producer: DJ Bobby B

=== King Harbor (2003) ===
King Harbor is the only studio album from American turntablism duo Tsunami Brothers. It was released on July 22, 2003.

#	Title	Featured guest(s)	Time
1	Enter The Temple	Chucky Styles	4:16
2	Evil's	Daddy X, Johnny Richter, Judge D	3:35
3	Hands Like Bombs		4:05
4	Building Pakelika Robots	Pakelika	3:40
5	Here Come The Tsunami Brothers		3:23
6	Watch'n Time Fly		4:28
7	Tidal Wave		4:58
8	The Crab Shack Special	T.J. Lavin, Big B, and Soulman and Milky	3:40
9	Rice In The Fader	Chucky Styles	3:08
10	D.G.A.F.	Kona Gold, D-Loc, Big Bloe, and Big B	2;10
11	Classic Burger	Johnny Richter and Mekelly	4:21
