= Nervous system (disambiguation) =

The nervous system is a highly complex part of an animal that coordinates its actions and sensory information.

Nervous System may also refer to:

- Nervous System (album), a 2011 album by The Dirtball
- Nervous System (EP), a 2017 EP by Julia Michaels
- "Nervous System" (song), a 1979 song by Killing Joke
