= Kingspade (album) =

Studio album by Kingspade
- Released: August 24, 2004
- Recorded: 2004
- Genre: Rap
- Label: Suburban Noize Records

Kingspade chronology
Kingspade (2004)	P.T.B. (2007)

Kingspade is the debut album of the American rap duo Kingspade. Kingspade was a long-awaited album as it was promoted throughout albums from the group's alternate band, the Kottonmouth Kings. On the week of September 11, 2004 the album hit #11 on the Billboard Top Internet Albums chart, #44 on Top Heatseekers, and #31 on Top Independent Albums.

== Singles ==
- "Drunk in the Club"
- "Spaded Jaded & Faded"
- "Who's Down?"

== Track listing ==
#	Title	Time
1	The Krowning	1:22
2	This Dat Beat	3:26
3	Who's Down	3:54
4	Smokin' Doja	3:44
5	Drunk in the Club	3:40
6	Keep Risin'	4:13
7	Tat Shop Talk	1:12
8	Same Ol' Bitches	3:52
9	Life	4:07
10	So Cal Weather	4:05
11	Spaded, Jaded, and Faded	3:56
12	Spin Dat Shit	3:27
13	So Loaded	3:56
14	It's Alright	4:33
15	Lemon vs Crack	4:05
16	High Riders	4:18
