= Rollin' Stoned =

Studio album by Kottonmouth Kings
- Released: October 8, 2002
- Recorded: 2002
- Genre: Rap rock
- Length: 1:17:21
- Label: Suburban Noize; Capitol
- Producer: Daddy X (also exec.); DJ Bobby B; Julian Raymond; Mike Kumagai

Kottonmouth Kings chronology
Hidden Stash II: The Kream of the Krop (2001)	Rollin' Stoned (2002)	Fire It Up (2004)

Professional ratings
Review scores
Source	Rating
AllMusic	3/5 stars
Now	NNN/NNNNN
Rolling Stone	2/5 stars

Rollin' Stoned is the fourth studio album by American rap rock group Kottonmouth Kings. It was released on October 8, 2002, via Suburban Noize/Capitol Records. Production was handled by Mike Kumagai, Julian Raymond, and member Daddy X. The album peaked at number 51 on the Billboard 200 in the United States.

== Track listing ==
No.	Title	Writer(s)	Producer(s)	Length
1.	"Magic Bus (Intro)" (featuring Sky Blue)		Daddy X; Mike Kumagai	0:47
2.	"Sleepers"	Brad Xavier; Dustin Miller; Timothy McNutt; Michael Kumagai	Daddy X; Mike Kumagai	3:52
3.	"Full Throttle"	Xavier; Miller; McNutt; Doug Carrion; Kumagai	Daddy X; Mike Kumagai	4:06
4.	"4-2-0"	Xavier; Miller; McNutt; Kumagai	Daddy X; Mike Kumagai	4:05
5.	"Big Bank (Interlude)"		Daddy X; Mike Kumagai	0:26
6.	"Enjoy"	Xavier; Miller; McNutt; Kumagai	Daddy X; Mike Kumagai	3:46
7.	"Positive Vibes"	Xavier; Miller; McNutt; Carrion; Kumagai	Julian Raymond	3:42
8.	"Zero Tolerance"	Xavier; Miller; McNutt; Carrion; Kumagai	Daddy X; Mike Kumagai	3:08
9.	"Float Away"	Xavier; Miller; McNutt; Luiz Gaez; Kumagai	Daddy X; Mike Kumagai	3:58
10.	"Pot Head (Interlude)"		Daddy X; Mike Kumagai	0:20
11.	"Pushin' Limits"	Xavier; Miller; McNutt; Kumagai	Daddy X; Mike Kumagai	3:45
12.	"Pull, Pull (Interlude)"		Daddy X; Mike Kumagai	0:26
13.	"Rest of My Life"	Xavier; Miller; McNutt; Gaez	Daddy X; Mike Kumagai	5:40
14.	"Living in Fear" (featuring Judge D)	Xavier; Miller; McNutt; Daniel Rogers; Kumagai	Daddy X; Mike Kumagai	3:50
15.	"Sub-Noize Rats"	Xavier; Miller; McNutt; Carrion	Daddy X; Mike Kumagai	2:33
16.	"Strange Daze"	Xavier; Miller; McNutt; Kumagai	Daddy X; Mike Kumagai	3:50
17.	"Tangerine Sky"	Xavier; Miller; McNutt; Gaez; Kumagai	Daddy X; Mike Kumagai	4:12
18.	"Built to Last"	Xavier; Miller; Robert Adams; Carrion	Daddy X; DJ Bobby B	3:56
19.	"Waking Dream"	Xavier; Miller; McNutt; Gaez; Kumagai	Daddy X; Mike Kumagai	4:14
20.	"Soul Surfin'"	Xavier; Miller; McNutt; Carrion; Kumagai	Daddy X; Mike Kumagai	4:33
21.	"Endless Highway"	Xavier; Miller; McNutt; Kumagai	Daddy X; Mike Kumagai	3:50
22.	"Light It Up"	Xavier; Miller; McNutt; Gaez	Daddy X; Mike Kumagai	8:22
Total length:				1:17:21

== Personnel ==
- Brad "Daddy X" Xavier – vocals (tracks: 2–4, 6–9, 11, 13–22), producer (tracks: 1–6, 8–22), executive producer
- Dustin "D-Loc" Miller – vocals (tracks: 2–4, 6–9, 11, 13–22), additional scratches (track 18)
- Timothy "Johnny Richter" McNutt – vocals (tracks: 2–4, 6–9, 11, 13–17, 19–22)
- Luiz "Lou Dog" Gaez – drums (tracks: 2, 4, 6, 11, 13, 14, 18, 19)
- Robert "DJ Bobby B" Adams – scratches, producer (track 18)
- Sky Blue Xavier – vocals (track 1)
- Will "Sweet Dick" Perry – vocals (tracks: 5, 10, 12)
- Hopper – vocals (tracks: 5, 10, 12)
- Daniel "The Judge" Rogers – vocals (track 14)
- Doug Carrion – guitar (tracks: 3, 8, 9, 11, 13–15, 17–22), bass (tracks: 3, 11, 17, 18)
- Brad Gordon – keyboards (tracks: 9, 13, 19, 22)
- Scott Koziol – bass (tracks: 8, 9, 13, 15, 20, 22)
- Byron McMackin – drums (tracks: 3, 15, 20)
- Scott Garrett – drums (tracks: 8, 9, 19)
- BJ Smith – percussion (tracks: 13, 22)
- Mike Kumagai – producer (tracks: 1–6, 8–17, 19–22), mixing, engineering
- Julian Raymond – producer (track 7)
- Patrick Shevelin – mixing, engineering
- Chris Lord-Alge – mixing (track 7)
- Pete Taitague – assistant engineering
- Brian "Big Bass" Gardner – mastering
- James Droopy Sanderson – artwork
- Fabrice Henssens – photography
- Alan Karalian – design, layout

== Charts ==
Chart (2002)	Peak position
US Billboard 200	51
