= Cloud Nine (Kottonmouth Kings album) =

Studio album by Kottonmouth Kings
- Released: August 28, 2007
- Recorded: 2006–2007
- Genre: Hip hop; alternative rock; punk rock; rap rock
- Label: Suburban Noize Records
- Producer: Kevin Zinger (exec.); Daddy X (also exec.); Mike Kumagai; P-Nice; B-Real; Jay Turner; Robert Rebeck; UnderRated

Kottonmouth Kings chronology
Koast II Koast (2006)	Cloud Nine (2007)	The Green Album (2008)

Professional ratings
Review scores
Source	Rating
411Mania	(8.5/10)
AllMusic	3/5 stars
Faygoluvers.net	4/5 stars
PopMatters	5/10
RapReviews	5.5/10

Cloud Nine is the eighth studio album by American hip hop group Kottonmouth Kings. It was released on August 28, 2007, under Suburban Noize Records. Band member Daddy X stated that Cloud Nine is the "most adventurous" Kottonmouth Kings album release to date. Cloud Nine features artists such as Tech N9ne, the Insane Clown Posse, and Cypress Hill. It includes a bonus DVD containing videos for the songs "City 2 City", "Livin' Proof", "Think 4 Yourself", and others that not only include the Kottonmouth Kings, but also that of their newly signed labelmates. The album title was thought up by band member Pakelika. It is meant to show that it is their ninth official album and also referred to the so-called "greatness of being high with the heavens". (From informal English: to be on cloud nine - to be extremely happy)

As of the week of September 15, 2007 the album debuted at number 44 on the U.S. Billboard 200 chart, selling about 14,000 copies in its first week, #10 on the Billboard's Top Rap Albums, and #3 on the Top Independent Albums chart. The albums also made it to #45 on the Billboard Comprehensive Albums, #44 on the Billboard's Top Internet Albums, #14 on the Top Modern Rock/Alternative Albums, #14 on the Top Rock Albums and #13 on the Tastemakers chart.

== Track listing ==
No.	Title	Producer(s)	Length
1.	"Controlled Substance"	Mike Kumagai; Daddy X; P-Nice	3:50
2.	"Livin' Proof"	Mike Kumagai; Daddy X; P-Nice	2:53
3.	"Marijuana"	Mike Kumagai; Daddy X; P-Nice	3:33
4.	"Think 4 Yourself" (featuring Insane Clown Posse)	Mike Kumagai; Daddy X; P-Nice	4:07
5.	"No Escape"	Mike Kumagai; Daddy X; P-Nice	3:37
6.	"Litas"	Mike Kumagai; Daddy X; P-Nice	4:09
7.	"One Day"	Mike Kumagai; Daddy X; P-Nice	4:09
8.	"City 2 City" (featuring Tech N9NE and Big Krizz Kaliko)	Robert Rebeck	4:11
9.	"Pass It Around"	Mike Kumagai; Daddy X; P-Nice	4:40
10.	"Ridin' High" (featuring B-Real)	Mike Kumagai; Daddy X; P-Nice	3:30
11.	"PTB"	Mike Kumagai; Daddy X; P-Nice	1:42
12.	"Riddled (Interlude)"	Mike Kumagai; Daddy X; P-Nice	0:44
13.	"Drunk with Power"	Mike Kumagai; Daddy X; P-Nice	3:34
14.	"It Ain't Easy"	Mike Kumagai; Daddy X; P-Nice	4:16
15.	"Loadies"	B-Real; Jay Turner	2:31
16.	"Don't Make Me Beg"	Mike Kumagai; Daddy X; P-Nice	4:07
17.	"Everyday Thang"	Mike Kumagai; Daddy X; P-Nice	3:58
18.	"All or Nothin'"	Mike Kumagai; Daddy X; P-Nice	3:27
19.	"Dark Side" (featuring Sen Dog)	Mike Kumagai; Daddy X; P-Nice	3:42
20.	"Free Willy"	Mike Kumagai; Daddy X; P-Nice	2:50
21.	"Time to Get High"	UnderRated	3:41
22.	"Proud to Be a Stoner"	Mike Kumagai; Daddy X; P-Nice	5:08

== Personnel ==
- Brad "Daddy X" Xavier – vocals, producer, executive producer
- Dustin "D-Loc" Miller – vocals
- Timothy "Johnny Richter" McNutt – vocals
- Luiz "Lou Dogg" Gaez – drums, percussion
- Robert "DJ Bobby B" Adams – turntables, programming, engineering
- Jaxson – guitar
- Joseph "Violent J" Bruce – vocals
- Joseph "Shaggy 2 Dope" Ultser – vocals
- Lady Love – additional vocals
- Eddie Tatar – guitar, bass
- Joe Tatar – drums
- Clinton Calton – guitar
- Damon Cisneros – guitar
- Sky Blue Xavier – additional vocals
- Samuel "Krizz Kaliko" Watson – vocals
- Aaron "Tech N9NE" Yates – vocals
- P. Bass Jones – bass
- Louis "B-Real" Freeze – vocals, producer
- Stoney Waters – additional vocals
- Senan "Sen Dog" Reyes – vocals
- Mike Kumagai – producer, engineering, mixing
- Patrick "P-Nice" Shevelin – producer, engineering, mixing
- Robert Rebeck – producer
- Jay Turner – producer
- Josh "UnderRated" Liederman – producer
- Tom Baker – mastering
- Kevin Zinger – executive producer, management
- Devin DeHaven – photography
- Ivory Daniel – management
- Ron Opaleski – booking

== Charts ==
Chart (2007)	Peak position
US Billboard 200	44
US Independent Albums (Billboard)	3
US Top Alternative Albums (Billboard)	14
US Top Rap Albums (Billboard)	10
US Top Rock Albums (Billboard)	14
US Top Tastemaker Albums (Billboard)	13
