= Fire It Up (Kottonmouth Kings album) =

Studio album by Kottonmouth Kings
- Released: April 20, 2004
- Recorded: 2003–04
- Genres: Rap rock, Rap punk
- Length: 1:12:04
- Label: Suburban Noize Records
- Producers: Daddy X; Mike Kumagai

Kottonmouth Kings chronology
Rollin' Stoned (2002)	Fire It Up (2004)	Kottonmouth Kings (2005)

Professional ratings
Review scores
Source	Rating
AllMusic	3/5 stars

Fire It Up is the fifth studio album by American hip hop group Kottonmouth Kings. It was released on April 20, 2004 via Suburban Noize Records with a bonus DVD titled Down 4 tha Krown which contained interviews, documentary footage, video clips and music videos. Production was handled by Mike Kumagai and member Daddy X, who also served as executive producer together with Kevin Zinger. It features guest appearances from Humble Gods and Casey Royer. The album peaked at number 42 on the Billboard 200 and number 4 on the Independent Albums in the United States.

== Track listing ==
No.	Title	Writer(s)	Length
1.	"Undaground Movement"		1:33
2.	"Fire It Up"	Brad Xavier; Dustin Miller; Timothy McNutt; Michael Kumagai	3:44
3.	"Legalize Freedom"	Xavier; Doug Carrion	1:02
4.	"In da House"	Xavier; Miller; McNutt; Kumagai	3:26
5.	"Bring It On"	Xavier; Miller; McNutt; Kumagai	3:49
6.	"Outcast"	Xavier; Miller; McNutt; Carrion; Kumagai	3:17
7.	"Angry Youth"	Xavier; Miller; McNutt; Kumagai	3:32
8.	"The Deal"	Xavier; Miller; McNutt; Kumagai	4:00
9.	"Who's the Criminal" (featuring Humble Gods)	Xavier; Miller; McNutt; Carrion; Kumagai	3:02
10.	"Eye of the Storm"	Xavier; Miller; McNutt; Kumagai	1:52
11.	"Bad Habits"	Xavier; Miller; McNutt; Kumagai	3:52
12.	"Johnny's Gotta Problem" (featuring Casey Royer)	Xavier; Miller; McNutt; Casey Royer; Kumagai	3:32
13.	"Life Styles"	Xavier; Miller; McNutt; Robert Rogers	3:49
14.	"Let's Fuck"	Xavier; Miller; McNutt; Kumagai	4:08
15.	"Down 4 the Krown"	Xavier; Miller; McNutt; Kumagai	3:49
16.	"Leave Us Alone"	Xavier; Miller; McNutt; Carrion; Kumagai	3:02
17.	"Ur Done"	Xavier; Miller; McNutt; Carrion; Kumagai	1:33
18.	"Skunk One"	Xavier; Miller; McNutt; Kumagai	3:32
19.	"Live to Day"	Xavier; Miller; McNutt; Kumagai	3:47
20.	"Rip the Night Away"	Xavier; Miller; McNutt; Carrion	3:46

Bonus tracks
No.	Title	Writer(s)	Length
21.	"High Ridaz"	Miller; McNutt; Park	4:09
22.	"Get Up"	Xavier; Miller; McNutt; Luiz Gaez; Carrion	3:48
Total length:			1:12:04

Japanese version bonus track
No.	Title	Length
23.	"Southern Cali Weather"	4:08

Down 4 Tha Krown DVD
No.	Title	Length
23.	"Bring It On" (Kottonmouth Kings)
24.	"Destroy" (Humble Gods)
25.	"Sub Noize Ratz" (Kottonmouth Kings)
26.	"Hooligan" (Big B)
27.	"Define Destiny" (Last Laugh)
28.	"Dogs On The Hunt" (Judge D)
29.	"Fools Paradise" (Humble Gods)
30.	"Money Talks" (Saint Dog)
31.	"Wrestle With The Pig" (Mower)
32.	"Magnetic Mic Control" (Phunk Junkeez)
33.	"Sleepers" (Kottonmouth Kings)

Notes

- Track 12 is a cover version of D.I.'s song "Johnny's Got a Problem" from 1986 Horse Bites Dog Cries.

== Personnel ==
- Brad "Daddy X" Xavier – vocals, producer, executive producer
- Dustin "D-Loc" Miller – vocals
- Timothy "Johnny Richter" McNutt – vocals
- Daniel "Judge D" Rogers – backup vocals, producer, writer
- Daniel "Danny P" Patterson – guitar (tracks: 1, 10, 11, 18)
- Doug Carrion – guitar (tracks: 6, 9, 12, 16, 17), bass (tracks: 2, 6, 7, 9, 11, 12, 16, 17, 19, 20, 22)
- Paul Ill – bass (tracks: 3, 11, 20, 22)
- Brad Gordon – keyboards (tracks: 1, 3, 10, 11, 20, 22)
- Tom Brayton – drums (tracks: 3, 11, 20)
- Byron McMackin – drums (tracks: 6, 12)
- Josh Freese – drums (track 9)
- Scott Garrett – drums (tracks: 16, 17, 19, 22)
- Mike Kumagai – producer, mixing, engineering
- Patrick Shevelin – mixing, engineering
- Tom Baker – mastering
- Kevin Zinger – executive producer
- Dave Leamon – cover
- Larry Love – illustration, layout
- Scott Harrison – photography

== Charts ==
Chart (2004)	Peak position
US Billboard 200	42
US Independent Albums (Billboard)	4
