= The Green Room (DJ Shaky Bonez album) =

Studio album by DJ Shaky Bonez
- Released: September 4, 2001
- Recorded: 2001
- Genre: Rap, Turntablism
- Label: Suburban Noize Records
- Producer: D-Loc; DJ Bobby B J. Dibbs

Alternative Album Cover

The Green Room is the debut album from DJ Shaky Bonez (a.k.a. D-Loc of the Kottonmouth Kings), released on September 4, 2001, with Suburban Noize Records.

== Track listing ==
#	Title	Time
1	Intro	3:06
2	Legalize It	1:37
3	It's Time to Get Stoned	1:32
4	Callin' Me a Sucka	1:21
5	Space Intruder	2:18
6	Back and Forth W/B-Dub	1:57
7	Stylez Awkward	1:16
8	Ragga Ways	1:12
9	Randy's Paper	2:44
10	The Real 1 Take Jake	6:40
11	B-Dub's Cuts	1:51
12	On My Own Shit	1:50
13	Dexterity	1:51
14	Showin' Respects	2:32
15	It's Not Techno	0:36
16	Diggin' in the Crates	0:39
17	P-Town Represent	2:11
18	I Smoke Too Much Weed	4:46
19	I Have Somethin' for You	1:36
20	The Conclusion	1:11
21	Outro	2:33
