= Kottonmouth Kings: Dopeumentary =

2001 film by Bill Wadsworth

- Directed by: Bill Wadsworth
- Produced by: Dave Wein; Bill Wadsworth; Kevin Zinger
- Starring: Kottonmouth Kings
- Music by: Kottonmouth Kings
- Distributed by: Suburban Noize Records
- Release date: May 8, 2001
- Country: United States
- Language: English

Kottonmouth Kings: Dopeumentary is a 2001 documentary film DVD starring the Kottonmouth Kings distributed by Suburban Noize Records which was directed and produced by Bill Wadsworth and Kevin Zinger released on May 8, 2001.

The DVD documents the making of the songs and albums by generally on the albums Royal Highness and Hidden Stash. Other than the videos viewed on this the Kottonmouth Kings are followed while on tour across California.

The DVD was re-packaged with the Hidden Stash II: The Kream of the Krop CD as Double Dose V3, the third and final Double Dose set.
