= Organic Soul =

Studio album by Daddy X
- Released: August 24, 2004
- Recorded: 2004
- Length: 1:15:24
- Label: Suburban Noize Records
- Producers: Daddy X (also exec.); Kevin Zinger (exec.); Brad Gordon; Doug Carrion; Eric "E-Man " Adger

Daddy X chronology
Organic Soul (2004)	Family Ties (2006)

Organic Soul is the debut solo album by Kottonmouth Kings' frontman Daddy X. It was released on August 24, 2004, via Suburban Noize Records. The nineteen-track record featured guest appearances from Smokin Scotty Dread, E-Mann A.K.A Eric"E-Man" Adger, Dogboy, and Sky Blue. As of September 11, 2004 the album made it to #18 on the Billboard Top Internet albums.

== Track listing ==
No.	Title	Length
1.	"The Great Escape"	3:31
2.	"Dyin' Breath"	3:21
3.	"Higher Than High"	4:09
4.	"Irie Feelin"	4:07
5.	"Settin' Sun"	5:21
6.	"Old School Shit"	2:30
7.	"Everybody Must Get Stoned"	4:05
8.	"Grow Your Own"	3:11
9.	"One Man Standin'"	4:39
10.	"Praise Jam" (featuring Smokin Scotty Dread)	3:30
11.	"Peaceful Day"	4:45
12.	"Round The World" (featuring E-Mann)	3:52
13.	"Wicked-N-Riteous"	4:10
14.	"Area 51"	2:15
15.	"Pleasure To Burn" (featuring Dog Boy)	4:27
16.	"Stoney Vibrations"	4:27
17.	"Get Up" (featuring Sky Blue)	3:38
18.	"Sky Blue"	5:11
19.	"Anna Rose"	4:15
Total length:		1:15:24

== Personnel ==
Bass – Paul Ill (tracks: 7, 11, 16, 17), Scott Koziel (tracks: 1, 3 to 5, 8, 9, 13, 18)
Bass, Keyboards – John Henry (14)
Drums – Lou Dog (tracks: 10, 19)
Drums, Percussion – Tom Brayton (tracks: 1, 3 to 5, 7 to 9, 11, 13, 16, 18)
Executive-Producer – Daddy X, Kevin Zinger
Guitar, Bass, Voice – Doug Carrion (tracks: 1 to 5, 7 to 9, 11, 13, 16 to 19)
Guitar, Voice – Scott Jensen
Keyboards, Guitar, Horns – Brad Gordon (tracks: 1 to 5, 7 to 11, 13, 16 to 19)
Mixed By, Engineer – Patrick "P-Nice" Shevelin
Producer – Brad Gordon (tracks: 10 to 19), Daddy X, Doug Carrion
Turntables – DJ Bobby B (tracks: 2, 16, 17)
Voice – Ricky Vodka (tracks: 1, 3 to 5, 9, 13, 18)
Track 12 Produced By Eric "E-Man" Adger

Vocals Track 12 Eric "E-Man" Adger
