= Stoners Reeking Havoc =

EP by Kottonmouth Kings
- Released: February 24, 1998
- Recorded: 1997–1998
- Length: 21:50
- Labels: Capitol; Suburban Noize Records
- Producer: Brad Daddy X

Kottonmouth Kings chronology
Stoners Reeking Havoc (1998)	Royal Highness (1998)

Stoners Reeking Havoc is the Kottonmouth Kings' first EP-CD released on February 24, 1998. In a 2015 interview with Johnny Richter, he stated that he was a member of the group at the time of the EP's release but wasn't on it due to personal issues with Daddy X, another member of the group.

== Track listing ==
CD Version
No.	Title	Length
1.	"Frontline"	5:30
2.	"Suburban Life" (1605 Mix)	3:37
3.	"Roll It Up"	4:03
4.	"Three Horny Devils"	4:27
5.	"Bump" (Bobby B Homegrown Mix)	4:13

Vinyl version
No.	Title	Length
1.	"Freaks Of The Industry"	4:22
2.	"Lovesongs"	4:16
3.	"Suburban Life"	3:34
4.	"Suburban Life" (1605 Mix)	3:38
5.	"Bong Toking Alcoholics"	4:44

== Personnel ==
- Daddy X - Vocals, Lyrics
- D-Loc - Vocals, Lyrics
- Saint Dog - Vocals, Lyrics
- DJ Bobby B - DJ, Engineering, Programmer, Turntables
