= Kingspade =

American hip hop group

- Origin: Placentia, CA, United States
- Genres: Hip hop
- Years active: 2002–2013, 2017-2020
- Label: Suburban Noize Records
- Members: D-Loc (Dustin Garrett Miller); Johnny Richter (Tim McNutt)
- Website: kingspade.com

Kingspade was an American rap duo Johnny Richter (Tim McNutt) and D-Loc (Dustin Garrett Miller) of Kottonmouth Kings.

== History ==
=== Kingspade ===
Kingspade debuted with the track "The Adventures of This" on the Subnoize Rats Compilation in 2003. One year later the Kottonmouth Kings' sixth full-length album Fire It Up was released, including two bonus tracks. One of these was a new Kingspade track entitled "High Riders". On this track it was announced that a Kingspade album was to be released later that year.

In the summer of 2004, Kingspade's debut album was released. This album included the hits "Drunk in the Club" and the previously released "High Riders". Following this release came some touring until they started to work on the next Kottonmouth Kings album. Over the next few years not much was heard from Kingspade other than a few shows here and there.

In 2005, the Kottonmouth Kings released the album Joint Venture, which featured two new Kingspade tracks. Also included was an advertisement stating that a new Kingspade album would be released in June 2006. Promotion was also brought upon with in ad included in the Kottonmouth Kings' fourteenth official album, Koast II Koast, stating the release would come in the late summer of 2006. This information turned out to be false. Nothing was heard of the album or Kingspade for months until the release of Kottonmouth Kings' Hidden Stash III, which included a new Kingspade track entitled "That's How It Goes". A few months later, it was announced that Kingspade would be performing on Kottonmouth Kings' The Joint is on Fire Tour. It was also stated that Kingspade's second release, P.T.B., would be released on April 24, 2007.

Following the release of P.T.B., Kingspade headlined their own tour, accompanied by California-natives 1Ton and UnderRated, who make up the music group Potluck.

Kingspade then rejoined the Kottonmouth Kings on their StrangeNoize Tour. This tour included Tech N9ne, Hed PE, Blaze Ya Dead Homie, and SubNoize Souljaz. Special appearances included the Insane Clown Posse, Cypress Hill and Ill Bill of La Coka Nostra. The tour was to celebrate the Kottonmouth Kings' ninth full-length album, Cloud Nine.

They had three tours in the state of Texas, and got into some trouble with authorities there. D-loc would not give a lot of information on this topic, but Richter said this, "Me and D was just rhymin... after the show we headed out to the cars, not knowing that police would be waiting for us. One of the girls that were at the concert had gotten hit by the falling speaker me and D were playin with."

In March 2013, it was announced by Daddy X that KMK was leaving SubNoize and starting up a new label. A few days after the announcement, it was found out that the label would be called United Family Music. In October 2013, Johnny Richter announced via Twitter that he was officially no longer a part of Kottonmouth Kings. He also stated in his comments that he was unsure if he'd continue with music. This instantly conjured bad blood on both sides, with both sides stating "I won't work with them/him again", and simultaneously putting Kingspade on hiatus. In December 2013, he released his second overall solo album titled FreeKing Out EP on SubNoize. D-Loc released a solo album titled Bong Tokes & Love Notes EP in December 2013. Kottonmouth Kings released their first album without Johnny Richter since 1999 with the CD Buddah Shack EP. The group would go on to release one final studio album titled Krown Power on August 28, 2015.

On December 2, 2017, via Instagram, a picture was uploaded showing D-Loc and Johnny Richter reunited and possibly hinting at something happening with the group, as well as a Kingspade Instagram account launching, and an announcement from D-Loc saying he was putting together a documentary on how the group was formed, the career of the group, and the current status of the group. It has some fans saying that the 2 are only together for the documentary and nothing more, to fans hopeful of a classic KMK lineup (D-Loc, Daddy X, Jonny Richter, [and later] The Dirtball) album and final tour.

== Discography ==
=== Albums ===
#	Title	Year	Label
1	Kingspade	August 24, 2004	Suburban Noize Records
2	P.T.B.	April 24, 2007	Suburban Noize Records
3	King of Spades (Live Album)	2013	Suburban Noize Records

=== Singles ===
#	Title	Year	Album
1	"Drunk in the Club"	2004	Kingspade
2	"Spaded, Jaded, & Faded"	2004	Kingspade
3	"Who's Down"	2004	Kingspade
4	"We Back"	2005	Joint Venture
5	"Who Run This?"	2007	P.T.B.
6	"We Ridin'"	2007	P.T.B.
7	"That's How It Goes"	2007	P.T.B.
8	"Who We"	2018	New untitled album

== Filmography ==
#	Title	Year	Label
1	Throw Your Spades Up!	2008	Suburban Noize Records
