= Kottonmouth Kings (album) =

No. 7

Studio album by Kottonmouth Kings
- Released: May 31, 2005
- Recorded: 2005
- Genre: Rap rock
- Length: 1:15:01
- Label: Suburban Noize Records
- Producer: Kevin Zinger (exec.); Daddy X (exec.); Mike Kumagai

Kottonmouth Kings chronology
Fire It Up (2004)	No. 7 (2005)	Koast II Koast (2006)

Alternative Album Cover
- The Alternative Album Cover which can be found only in a set with the original at The online Kottonmouth Kings Store

Professional ratings
Review scores
Source	Rating
AllMusic	3/5 stars

Kottonmouth Kings No. 7 is the sixth studio album by American hip hop group Kottonmouth Kings. It was released on May 31, 2005 via Suburban Noize Records. The album is also known as "No. 7" because of it being the seventh release overall.

Production was handled by Mike Kumagai and member Daddy X, who also served as executive producer together with Kevin Zinger. It features guest appearances from Cypress Hill and Tech N9NE.

The album peaked at number fifty on the Billboard 200, No. 21 on the Top Rap Albums, No. 2 on the Independent Albums, No. 50 on the Top Internet Albums, and No. 50 on Billboard Comprehensive Albums.

== Track listing ==
No.	Title	Writer(s)	Length
1.	"King Klick"	Brad Xavier; Dustin Miller; Timothy McNutt; Michael Kumagai	4:12
2.	"Make It Hot"	Xavier; Miller; McNutt; Kumagai	4:32
3.	"Get Your High On"	Xavier; Miller; McNutt; Kumagai	3:41
4.	"Bottoms Up"	Xavier; Miller; McNutt; Kumagai	4:01
5.	"Shakey Bones (Interlude)"	Miller; Patrick Shevelin	0:51
6.	"We Got the Chronic"	Xavier; Miller; McNutt; Kumagai	4:01
7.	"Peace of Mind"	Xavier; Miller; McNutt; Kumagai	3:37
8.	"F.T.I. 2" (featuring Tech N9NE)	Xavier; Miller; McNutt; Aaron D. Yates; Kumagai	4:20
9.	"Revolution"	Xavier; Miller; McNutt; Doug Carrion; Kumagai	4:11
10.	"Let the Sunshine"	Xavier; Miller; McNutt; Bill Mahoney; Carrion; Kumagai	3:28
11.	"Piss Test (Interlude)"	Xavier	1:51
12.	"Put It Down" (featuring Cypress Hill)	Xavier; Miller; McNutt; Louis Freese; Senen Reyes; Kumagai	4:56
13.	"People Come, People Go"	Xavier; Miller; McNutt; Kumagai	3:32
14.	"Watch Your Back"	Xavier; Miller; McNutt; Kumagai	3:50
15.	"Slow Suicide"	Xavier; Miller; McNutt; Carrion	2:39
16.	"P-Town"	Xavier; Miller; McNutt; Kumagai	3:56
17.	"The Munchies"	Xavier; Miller; McNutt; Kumagai	4:11
18.	"Nitrous Tank (Interlude)"	McNutt; Shevelin	1:14
19.	"Wasted"	Xavier; Miller; McNutt; Carrion; Kumagai	3:53
20.	"Take a Bath"	Xavier; Miller; McNutt; Kumagai	4:02
21.	"Stick Together"	Xavier; Miller; McNutt; Kumagai	4:03
22.	"Wake N Bake"		1:58
Total length:			1:15:01

== Personnel ==
- Brad "Daddy X" Xavier – vocals, producer, executive producer
- Dustin "D-Loc" Miller – vocals
- Timothy "Johnny Richter" McNutt – vocals
- Daniel "Judge D" Rogers – backing vocals, producer, writer
- BJ Smith – backing vocals (tracks: 3, 7, 13, 20)
- Ricky "Vodka" Gaez – backing vocals (track 7)
- Aaron "Tech N9NE" Yates – vocals (track 8)
- Bill "Big B" Mahoney – backing vocals (tracks: 10, 14)
- Anna Rose – vocals (track 10)
- Sky Blue Xavier – vocals (track 10)
- Raymond Calhoun – backing vocals & drums (track 11)
- Louis "B-Real" Freeze – vocals (track 12)
- Senan "Sen Dog" Reyes – vocals (track 12)
- Doug Carrion – guitar (tracks: 9, 10, 15, 19), bass (tracks: 9, 15, 19)
- Tom Brayton – drums (track 9)
- Brad Gordon – keyboards (track 11)
- Mike Sattin – bass (track 11)
- Will "Sweet Dick" Perry – additional vocals
- Mike Kumagai – producer, recording, mixing
- Patrick "P-Nice" Shevelin – recording, mixing
- Tom Baker – mastering
- Kevin Zinger – executive producer

== Charts ==
Chart (2005)	Peak position
US Billboard 200	50
US Independent Albums (Billboard)	2
US Top Rap Albums (Billboard)	21
