= Kottonmouth Kings =

American hip hop and rap rock group

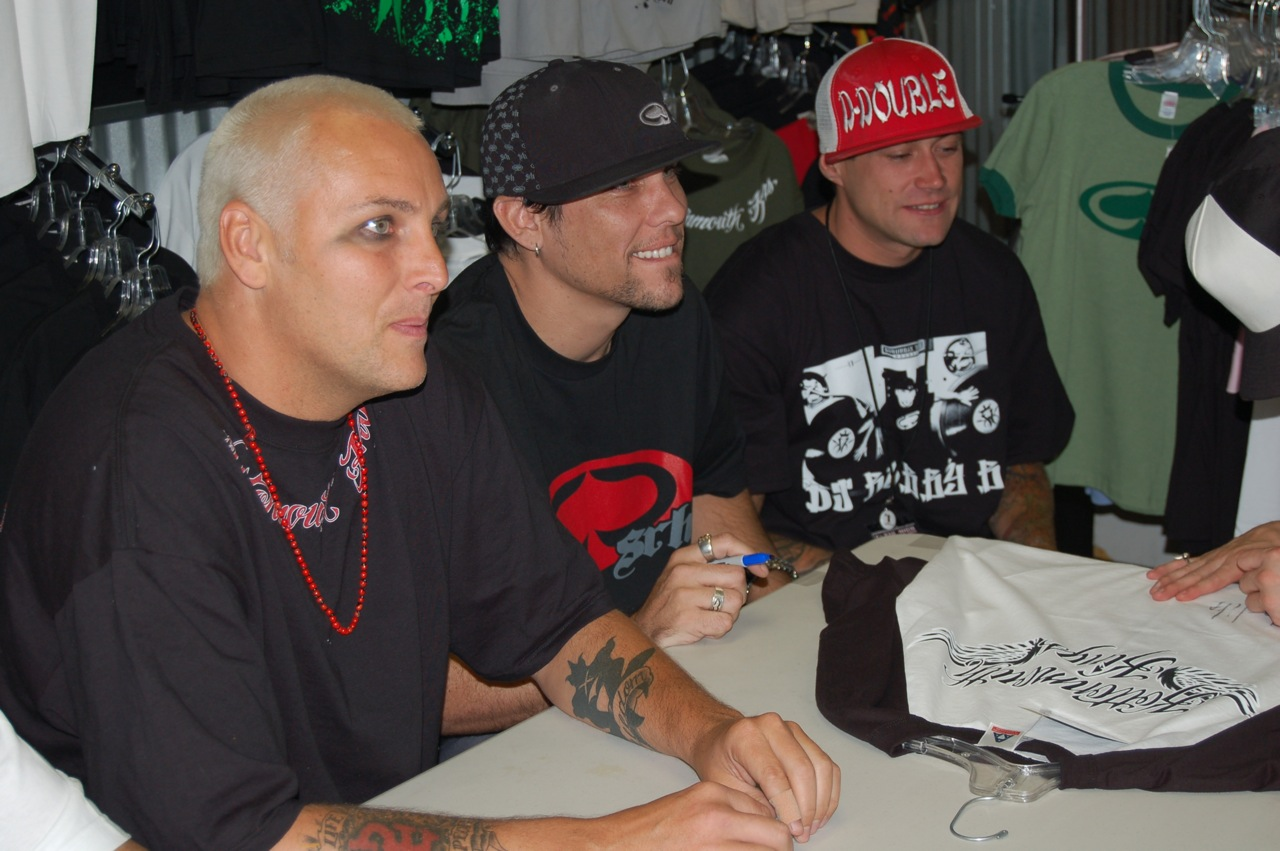
- Kottonmouth Kings in 2006

Background information
- Origin: Placentia, California, U.S.
- Genres: Hip-hop; rap rock
- Years active: 1996–2016, 2018–2020, 2022-present
- Labels: Virgin Music Group; KottonMouth ReKordz; PTB Records; Suburban Noize Records; Capitol Records
- Members: D-Loc; Taxman; Chucky Chuck; Judge D
- Past members: Saint Dog; Pakelika; Johnny Richter; DJ Bobby B; Daddy X; The Dirtball; DJ Rob Harris; Lou Dog
- Website: KottonmouthKings.com

The Kottonmouth Kings are an American hip-hop and rap rock group formed in Placentia, California in 1996 by D-Loc and Saint Dog. The group advocates for legalizing cannabis, and their lyrics contain frequent references to marijuana consumption. The group's music sometimes incorporate elements of other genres, including punk rock, psychedelic rock, reggae, dubstep, bluegrass and jam band.

== History ==
=== P-Town Ballers Era (1994–1995) ===
Before the group was officially established as the Kottonmouth Kings, its origins were rooted in Placentia, California (often referred to locally as "P-Town"). The collective's initial incarnation was a group known as the P-Town Ballers. This original lineup consisted of D-Loc, Saint Dog, Johnny Richter, and Judge D, who performed together in the local scene prior to the project's evolution into the larger Kottonmouth Kings entity.

=== Cottonmouth (1996-1997) ===
Following the P-Town Ballers era, Judge D departed the group to pursue other musical interests. D-Loc and Saint Dog then reorganized under various names, including Cottonmouth, Cottonmouth Kings, and Cottonmouth Committee, with a lineup that included Daddy X and Johnny Richter. The group eventually solidified as the Kottonmouth Kings, Johnny Richter than departed from the group due to personal issues. They then signed with Capitol Records and Suburban Noize Records. The major label lineup featured D-Loc, Saint Dog, Daddy X, DJ Bobby B, Lou Dog, and Pakelika. In 2020, D-Loc released the album OG Demos: Seeds of The Krown featuring some of the earliest demos from this era. In 2023, D-Loc and Suburban Noize released the EP "The First Krop," which features even more unreleased demos from this formative era.

=== Royal Highness (1998–1999) ===
On February 24, 1998, Kottonmouth Kings released their first overall album, and their first EP, Stoners Reeking Havoc.

On August 11, 1998, Kottonmouth Kings released their first national album, first studio album, and second overall album titled Royal Highness on Suburban Noize Records and Capitol Records. The album featured the original lineup of Daddy X, D-Loc, Saint Dog on vocals, and Lou Dog on drums and percussion, and DJ Bobby B.

On March 11, 1999, Kottonmouth Kings released their second EP, and third overall album, Stash Box. On October 26, 1999, Kottonmouth Kings released their first compilation album, Hidden Stash. This was also the last album to feature Saint Dog as a member of Kottonmouth Kings in this era.

=== High Society (2000) ===
Kottonmouth Kings began to gain mainstream success with the release of their third studio album, and their fifth overall album, High Society on June 27, 2000. This was the first album to feature "original" member Johnny Richter. The album charted at #65 on the Billboard 200.

=== Hidden Stash II: The Kream of the Krop (2001) ===
On September 4, 2001 D-Loc released his first solo album and his first under the name DJ Shakey Bonez titled The Green Room.

Kottonmouth Kings toured with D12/Primer 55 and Bionic Jive during the fall of 2001 in support of their fourth studio album, and sixth overall album, Hidden Stash II: The Kream of the Krop which was released on October 9, 2001. The album charted at #100 on the Billboard 200.

=== Rollin' Stoned (2002–2003) ===
On October 8, 2002, Kottonmouth Kings released their fourth studio album, and their seventh overall album titled Rollin' Stoned. The album charted at #51 on the Billboard 200.

On July 22, 2003, the Tsunami Brothers released their debut album King Harbor.

On August 12, 2003, Kottonmouth Kings released their third compilation album, their first live album, a double CD Classic Hits Live.

=== Fire It Up (2004) ===
On April 20, 2004, Kottonmouth Kings released their fifth studio album, and their tenth overall release titled Fire It Up. The album charted at #42 on the Billboard 200.

On August 24, 2004, Daddy X released Organic Soul, his first solo album, and Kingspade released their debut album titled Kingspade.

On November 16, 2004, Kottonmouth Kings released their fourth compilation album, and their eleventh overall album, The Kottonmouth Xperience.

=== No. 7 (2005) ===
On May 31, 2005, Kottonmouth Kings released their sixth studio album, and their twelfth overall album titled No. 7. The album charted at #50 on the Billboard 200.

On November 15, 2005, Kottonmouth Kings released their fifth compilation album and their thirteenth overall album, Joint Venture. The album charted at #193 on the Billboard 200.

=== Koast II Koast (2006) ===
On January 31, 2006 Daddy X released his second solo album titled Family Ties.

On May 9, 2006, Kottonmouth Kings released their third EP, and fourteenth overall album titled Nickel Bag. The album was a prelude to Koast II Koast, their seventh studio album, released June 6. Koast II Koast charted at #39 on the Billboard 200.

In 2006, Kottonmouth Kings headlined at the annual Cannabis Cup, and was named "Band of the Year" by High Times.

On November 21, 2006, Kottonmouth Kings released their sixth compilation album and their sixteenth overall album, Hidden Stash III. The album charted at #199 on the Billboard 200.

=== Cloud Nine (2007) ===
On April 24, 2007 Kingspade released their second album, P.T.B..

On August 28, 2007, Kottonmouth Kings released their eighth studio album and their seventeenth overall album, Cloud Nine. The album charted at #44 on the Billboard 200.

=== The Green Album (2008–2009) ===
On January 15, 2008, Kottonmouth Kings released their seventh compilation album, and their eighteenth overall album, Greatest Highs. The album charted at #168 on the Billboard 200.

On April 15, 2008, Kottonmouth Kings released their eighth compilation album and their nineteenth overall album, The Kottonmouth Xperience Vol. II: Kosmic Therapy.

On October 28, 2008, Kottonmouth Kings released their ninth studio album and their twentieth overall album, The Green Album. The album charted at #42 on the Billboard 200.

In 2009, D-Loc released his second solo album and his second under the name DJ Shakey Bonez titled Kingspade Presents D-Loc's DJ Shakey Bonez: Dog Treats.

On October 13, 2009, Kottonmouth Kings released their tenth compilation album and their twenty-third overall album titled Hidden Stash 420. The album charted at #103 on the Billboard 200.

=== Long Live the Kings (2010) ===
On April 20, 2010, Kottonmouth Kings released their tenth studio album, Long Live the Kings. The album charted at #26 on the Billboard 200. Ironically named, the album was the last time Pakelika would be on as he was kicked out of the group by Daddy X, and died some time later.

On July 6, 2010 Johnny Richter released his debut solo album, Laughing.

On August 17, 2010 D-Loc released his third solo album and the first under the name D-Loc titled MFK (Made for Kings).

=== Sunrise Sessions (2011) ===
On March 1, 2011 The Dirtball released his fifth solo album, fourth on Suburban Noize Records, and first since joining Kottonmouth Kings, titled Nervous System.

On April 19, 2011, Kottonmouth Kings released their fifth EP and their twenty-fifth overall album, Legalize It.

On July 19, 2011, Kottonmouth Kings released their eleventh studio album, Sunrise Sessions. The album charted at #46 on the Billboard 200.

On November 8, 2011, Kottonmouth Kings released their eleventh compilation album, Hidden Stash 5: Bongloads & B-Sides.

=== Mile High (2012–2013) ===
On March 20, 2012 D-Loc released his fourth solo album and the second under the name D-Loc, an EP titled Weedman.

On May 22, 2012 The Dirtball released his sixth solo album, fifth on Suburban Noize Records, and second since joining Kottonmouth Kings, an EP titled Desert Eagle.

Dancer Pakelika died on August 14, 2012.

On August 14, 2012, Kottonmouth Kings released their twelfth studio album and their twenty-eighth overall album, Mile High. The album charted at #36 on the Billboard 200.

On December 25, 2013, D-Loc released his fifth solo album and the third under the name D-Loc, a second EP titled Bong Tokes & Love Notes.

=== Independent (2013–2014) ===
In March 2013 it was announced via social media accounts that Kottonmouth Kings had left Suburban Noize Records. Daddy X filed for the copyright of the name United Family Music.

In October 2013, Johnny Richter announced via Twitter that he was leaving Kottonmouth Kings, and was unsure if he would continue to do music. He released his first post-Kottonmouth Kings solo album, an EP titled FreeKing Out on December 17, 2013. However, he is still currently signed with Subnoize Records as a solo artist.

=== The Buddah Shack EP (2014) ===
On April 20, 2014, Kottonmouth Kings released their first post-Johnny Richter album, their sixth EP titled The Buddah Shack.

In September 2014, the band announced on Twitter and Facebook that their new album, Krown Power, was in the final stages of being mixed and was set to be released in early 2015. On December 31, 2014, Kottonmouth Kings officially announced via their Twitter account that the album, the first LP release on United Family Music, would be dropping on April 21, 2015.

=== Krown Power (2015–2016) ===
In early April 2015, KMK announced that the new tentative release date for Krown Power was set for June 2015, and that the album would be available for pre-order on April 20, 2015. A single and the accompanying video would be released each month leading up to the release of the album; the debut single/music video was "Ganja Glow".

In August 2015, DJ Bobby B announced on Instagram that he and the band had parted ways after working together for nineteen years.

On August 28, 2015, Krown Power, Kottonmouth Kings' thirteenth studio album was released. In November 2015, it was announced that KMK was set to release a new album in 2016 titled Ganja Farm with Marlon Asher and original KMK member Saint Dog.

=== Hiatus (2016–2017) ===
After the 20th anniversary tour and the tour to promote Krown Power, the group quietly went on hiatus with no announcement. On July 31, 2017, D-Loc announced that the Kottonmouth Kings may still perform as a group at certain shows in the future.

=== Kingdom Come (2017–2020) ===
After the bands hiatus in late 2017, D-Loc The Kottonmouth Kings reformed in 2018 with the original founding members of the band D-Loc and Saint Dog. On January 31, 2018, the Kottonmouth Kings announced via social media that new music was set to be released in march of that year. On March 1, 2018, a music video was released by the band Kingspade. The song was titled "Who We". In the video it was announced that the Kottonmouth Kings would be releasing a new full-length album titled Kingdom Come on April 20, 2018. Saint Dog passed away on October 13th, 2020.

=== Live Band (2021–2022) ===
In 2021, D-Loc organized a new live legacy lineup of the Kottonmouth Kings featuring D-Loc, Chris Gonzalez, DJ Stigmata, Tavarez, and Damndad. On April 20, 2021, this iteration of the group released the album "25 To Life" on PTB Records. Following a mixed reception from long-time fans, the album was subsequently re-released in 2025 as a D-Loc solo project. This lineup ended in late 2022 after D-Loc began doing shows with Chucky Chuck.

=== Highwaters Era (2022-present) ===
In late 2022, D-Loc (Dustin Miller) began performing live with longtime collaborator Chucky Chuck (Charles Devries). This partnership eventually resulted in a new official lineup for the Kottonmouth Kings, featuring D-Loc and Chucky Chuck alongside returning early members Judge D (Daniel Rogers) and Taxman (Jeremy Blayne).

This configuration of the group released a series of standalone singles, beginning with "Your Future" and "Knock Knock," followed by "Lionz Of Babylon" (featuring Marlon Asher) in 2024, and "Run Game" in 2025. On February 27, 2026, the group released the single "Claimin" through PTB Records. Shortly after, the band secured a global distribution partnership with Virgin Music Group to release music under their own label, Kottonmouth Rekordz. Their first release under this new agreement was the single "Red Eye Flight," which appropriately debuted on April 20, 2026.

During a live performance in October 2025, original drummer Lou Dog (Lou Gaez) made a surprise appearance, announcing his return to the group for select future live dates. On May 22, 2026, the Kottonmouth Kings released a five-track extended play (EP) titled California Burning, fully produced by longtime collaborator Mike Kumagai and the group. Following the release of the EP, the band announced that a new full-length studio album is scheduled for release in August 2026, coinciding with the group's 30th anniversary.

== Members ==
- D-Loc (Dustin Miller) - vocals, production (1994–2016, 2018–present)
- Judge D (Daniel Rogers) - vocals (1994–1996, 2022–present)
- Lou Dog (Lou Gaez) - drums (1998–2016, 2025–present)
- Taxman (Jeremy Blayne) - vocals (2000–2013, 2022–present)
- Chucky Chuck (Charles Devries) - vocals (2022–present)

=== Former members ===
- Saint Dog (Steven Thronson) - vocals (1994–1999, 2018–2020); died 2020
- Johnny Richter (Timothy McNutt) - vocals (1994–1997, 2000–2013)
- Daddy X (Brad Xavier) - vocals, production (1996–2016)
- DJ Bobby B (Robert Adams) - turntables (1996–2015)
- Pakelika (Patrick Cochrun) - dancing (1996–2010); died 2012
- The Dirtball (David Alexander) - vocals (2009–2016)

== Discography ==
- Royal Highness (1998)
- Hidden Stash (1999)
- High Society (2000)
- Hidden Stash II: The Kream of the Krop (2001)
- Rollin' Stoned (2002)
- Fire It Up (2004)
- Kottonmouth Kings (2005)
- Koast II Koast (2006)
- Cloud Nine (2007)
- The Green Album (2008)
- Long Live the Kings (2010)
- Sunrise Sessions (2011)
- Mile High (2012)
- Krown Power (2015)
- Kingdom Come (2018)

== Solo albums ==
- The Green Room (2001) (DJ Shakey Bonez) (Suburban Noize Records)
- Organic Soul (2004) (Daddy X) (Suburban Noize Records)
- Family Ties (2006) (Daddy X) (Suburban Noize Records)
- Kingspade Presents D-Loc's DJ Shakey Bonez: Dog Treats (2009) (DJ Shakey Bonez) (Suburban Noize Records)
- Laughing (2010) (Johnny Richter) (Suburban Noize Records)
- MFK (Made for Kings) (2010) (D-Loc) (Suburban Noize Records)
- Nervous System (2011) (The Dirtball) (Suburban Noize Records)
- Weedman EP (2012) (D-Loc) (Suburban Noize Records)
- Desert Eagle EP (2012) (The Dirtball) (Suburban Noize Records)
- Bong Tokes & Love Notes EP (2013) (D-Loc) (Suburban Noize Records)
- Skull Hollow (2018) (The Dirtball) (Throttle House)
- The Harvest (2018) (D-Loc) (Kingmaker Music)
- Ripperside (2018) (D-Loc) (Kingmaker Music)
- Bozo (2019) (Saint Dog) (Suburban Noize Records)

== Filmography ==
Title	Released
Dopeumentary	May 8, 2001
Stoners Reeking Havoc	October 22, 2002
Endless Highway	August 12, 2003
The Kottonnmouth Kings	November 16, 2004
10 Years Deep	January 25, 2005
Evil Bong	October 24, 2006
The Joint Is on Fire (With VD)	February 20, 2007
Donsworld	April 1, 2007
Kottonmouth Kings and High Times Present: Kanabis Kup '06	2007
Throw Your Spades Up!	February 19, 2008
The Psychumentary	April 8, 2008
Long Live the Kings	April 20, 2010
Big Money Rustlas	August 17, 2010
