= Johnny Richter =

American rapper

- Richter in 2011

Background information
- Born: Timothy McNutt; June 18, 1977 (age 49)
- Origin: Placentia, California
- Genre: Hip hop
- Occupation: Emcee
- Years active: 1996–present
- Labels: Suburban Noize Records; Kingmaker Music (2017–2019)
- Formerly of: Kottonmouth Kings, Kingspade, Subnoize Souljaz King Klick

Timothy McNutt (born June 18, 1977), better known by his stage name Johnny Richter, is a rapper from Placentia, California. He was a member of the group Kottonmouth Kings from 1996 to 2013, and again from 2018 to 2020.

== Background ==
=== Kottonmouth Kings Era (1996 – 2013) ===
Johnny Richter was originally a member of Kottonmouth Kings, but was left off their debut album Royal Highness, because "he was serving time for marijuana possession", which Richter later said was untrue. Richter joined the group "officially" in 2000 after Saint Dog left the group.

Johnny Richter is also a member of the groups Kingspade, Subnoize Souljaz & King Klick.

Johnny Richter released his 1st solo album titled Laughing on July 6, 2010.

=== Independent/Solo Career (2013 – 2016) ===
In mid October 2013 via Facebook, Johnny Richter announced that he was leaving Kottonmouth Kings

In early December 2013 Johnny Richter announced that he was releasing a new solo album titled, FreeKing Out EP. The EP was released on December 17, 2013.

In mid 2015 Johnny Richter announced that he would be releasing a new album hopefully in late 2015. In December 2015 it was announced that the album would be released on July 29, 2016. In early 2016 the track list for the album was released, and so was the name, the album is titled: School's Out (Still Laughing).

=== Reunion with D-Loc and Saint Dog (2017-2020) ===
On December 2, 2017, via Instagram, a picture was uploaded showing D-Loc and Johnny Richter reunited and possibly hinting at something happening with the group, as well as a Kingspade Instagram account launching. On March 1, 2018, a music video was released by Kingspade. The song was titled "Who We". In the video it was announced that the Kottonmouth Kings would be releasing a new full-length album titled Kingdom Come on April 20, 2018. Richter only ended up on 6 out of the 16 album tracks and was credited as a featured guest.

=== King Klick (2021-present) ===
With Saint's passing on October 13, 2020, and D-Loc touring with a live band, Richter formed a new group with Chucky Chuck and Obnoxious called King Klick. Their debut single "We Want It All" was released on April 30, 2021. A 2nd single "Sub Noize O.G.'s" was released on September 16, 2021. The self-titled debut EP was released on October 1st, 2021.

== Discography ==
Album title	Release date	Label
Laughing	July 6, 2010	Suburban Noize Records
FreeKING Out	December 17, 2013	Suburban Noize Records
School's Out (Still Laughing)	July 29, 2016	Suburban Noize Records

== Music video appearances ==
Year	Title	Director	Notes
2021	"Who’s Next"	Eitan Melody (EITANS DESIGNS)	with King Klick
2014	"FreeKING Out"	WWW.YADAMEDIA.NET	
