= Daddy X =

American rapper and producer

Brad "Daddy X" Xavier
- Also known as: Jonny Bravo; Daddy X; Brad X; X-tra X
- Born: Thomas Bradford Xavier; February 20, 1965 (age 61)
- Origin: Placentia, California, U.S.
- Genres: Hip hop; punk rock
- Occupations: Rapper, producer
- Years active: 1983–2016, 2025
- Website: kottonmouthkings.com

Thomas Bradford "Brad" Xavier (born February 20, 1965), known by his stage name Daddy X, is an American hip hop producer and rapper. He used to be in the punk/hardcore band Doggy Style and the hip hop group Kottonmouth Kings in which he went by the stage name of Daddy X. He was the frontman for Kottonmouth Kings, Humble Gods, Doggy Style, Double Freak, Bonds Of Friendship, and X-Pistols (with The Dirtball). He has a daughter named Sky Blue Xavier, and wrote a song for her on his debut solo album Organic Soul.

== Discography ==
=== LPs ===
#	Title	Year	Label
1	Organic Soul	2004	Suburban Noize Records
2	Family Ties	2006	Suburban Noize Records

=== Singles ===
#	Title	Year	Label	Album
1	Mindbender	2006	Suburban Noize Records	Family Ties
2	All Seeing Eye	2006	Suburban Noize Records	Family Ties

== Videography ==
#	Title	Year	Album	Director	Label
1	Donut Shop Rock (Doggy Style)	1985	Side By Side		Flip Side Records
2	Price Tag (Humble Gods)	1996	No Heroes		
3	Luna	1996	Relief Through Release		Noise Records
4	Destroy (Humble Gods)	2003	Born Free		Suburban Noize Records
5	Irie Feelin'	2004	Organic Soul		Suburban Noize Records
6	Mindbender	2006	Family Ties		Suburban Noize Records
7	Freedom	2006	Family Ties	P-Nice	Suburban Noize Records
8	Shoot To Kill (X Pistols)	2010	Shoot To Kill		Suburban Noize Records
9	Wild Side (X Pistols)	2011	Shoot To Kill		Suburban Noize Records
