= Suburban Noize Records =

American independent record label

- Founded: 1997
- Founder: Kevin Zinger
- Distributors: Virgin Music Group (2023–present); INgrooves Music Group (2019–2023); Capitol Records (1997–2002); RED Distribution (2003–2012)
- Genre: Punk rock; hip hop
- Country of origin: U.S.
- Location: Burbank, California
- Official website: suburbannoizerecords.com

Suburban Noize Records, also known as Subnoize, is an independent record label based in Burbank, California that specializes in punk rock and hip hop music. The label was founded in 1997 by Kevin Zinger

== History ==
A majority of the label's merchandise and album sales are via the Internet and merchandising booths at live performances. The label relies heavily on word of mouth and underground promotion techniques.

A feud in 2013 between the label's founders, Daddy X and Kevin Zinger, put the label in limbo for a few years. On April 9, 2019, it was announced that Suburban Noize was reforming with Madchild, Hed PE, Swollen Members, Big B, Chucky Chuck of DGAF, Saint Dog, UnderRated of Potluck.

On November 1, 2019, it was announced that Whitney Peyton had signed to Suburban Noize.

On May 1, 2020, it was announced that San Diego rapper Obnoxious had signed to the label.

On April 6, 2021, it was announced that Dropout Kings had signed to Suburban Noize.

=== Current artists ===
Artist	Year signed	Description
Kottonmouth Kings	1997-2013	American hip hop group.
D-Loc	1997–2013, 2019–present	American solo rapper. Founding member of Kottonmouth Kings.
Johnny Richter	1997–2013	American solo rapper. Founding member of Kottonmouth Kings
Kingspade	1997-2013, 2019–present	American hip hop duo
Big B	2004–present	American solo rapper. Formerly of 187 and OPM respectively.
Hed PE	2006-2013, 2019–present	Formed by frontman Jared Gomes in 1994, Hed PE performs a style of music which it refers to as "G-punk", a fusion of punk rock and hip hop.
Swollen Members	2009-2013, 2019–present	Canadian hip hop group composed of Madchild (MC), Prevail (MC), and Rob The Viking (DJ) signed in collaboration with Battleaxe Records, a label formed by group member Madchild.
Moonshine Bandits	2010-2014, 2019–present	American country rap duo
Madchild	2011-2013, 2019–present	Canadian solo rapper as well as being co-founder of the Canadian hip hop group Swollen Members.
Prevail	2011-2013, 2019–present	Canadian solo rapper as well as being co-founder of the Canadian hip hop group Swollen Members.
Mickey Avalon	2011–2013, 2020–present	American solo rapper
UnderRated	2019–present	American hip hop rapper/producer from Humboldt County, California. Formerly of the duo Potluck.
Chucky Chuck	2019–present	American solo rapper. Founding member of DGAF.
Whitney Peyton	2019–present	American solo rapper
Long Beach Dub Allstars	2020–present	Legendary ska punk band
Obnoxious	2020–present	American solo rapper
Dropout Kings	2021–present	American nu-metal band
King Klick	2021–present	American hip hop supergroup
Salty Brasi	2021–present	American rapper
The Kaleidoscope Kid	2021–present	American rapper
Stacc Styles	2023-2026	American rapper. Released 'Live Your Best Life' on June 21, 2024.

=== Former artists ===
	Year(s) signed	Albums released on Suburban Noize	Notes
Daddy X	1995–2013	2	Co-founder of Suburban Noize
DJ Bobby B	1997–2013	4	Original deejay for the Kottonmouth Kings
Corporate Avenger	1998–2001	4	Currently signed to Massive Sound Records.
Brokencyde	2008-2010	2	American crunkcore group
Grand Vanacular	1999–2004	1	American solo rapper
Too Rude	2000–2007	2	American reggae rock band
Mix Mob	2002	1	American rock band
Phunk Junkeez	2003–2007	1	Currently signed to Dmaft Records
Judge D	2003–2008	2	American solo rapper
Mower	2003–2010	3	American hardcore punk band
Tsunami Brothers	2003–2008	1	American turntablism duo
Pakelika	2003–2010	2	American solo rapper. Died August 11, 2012.
Disfunction-ILL	2004	1	American hip hop duo
The Dirtball	2004–2013	6	American solo rapper
Humble Gods	2004	1	American hardcore punk band
DGAF	2005–2008	3	American hip hop group
Wicked Wisdom	2006	1	American nu metal band
X Clan	2006–2010	2	American hip hop group
OPM	2006–2010	3	Currently signed to MNO Records
Potluck	2006–2011	3	American hip hop duo. Disbanded in 2017
Authority Zero	2006–2013	3	American punk band
Danny Diablo	2007	1	Currently signed to Hellcat Records.
Mondo Generator	2007	1	American alternative metal band
Dog Boy	2007–2010	1	American solo artist. Frontman of Too Rude
Sen Dog	2008–2009	1	American solo rapper. Member of Cypress Hill
La Coka Nostra	2008–2012	1	Currently signed to Uncle Howie Records.
Unwritten Law	2008–2013	4	American punk band
Barry and the Penetrators	2009	1	American reggae rock band
Taintstick	2009–2010	1	American hard rock band
BLESTeNATION	2009–2012	1	American hip hop group
Saigon	2010–2012	2	American solo rapper
X-Pistols	2010–2013	1	Punk band led by Daddy X & The Dirtball
Slaine	2010–2014	3	American solo rapper. Member of La Coka Nostra
Glasses Malone	2011	1	American solo rapper
Jeffery Nothing	2011	1	American solo singer. Former Frontman of Mushroomhead
Cool Nutz	2012-2013	1	American solo rapper
Saint Dog	1997-2013	3	American solo rapper. Founding member of Kottonmouth Kings. Died October 13, 2020.
