= Kottonmouth Kings discography =

This is a discography of Kottonmouth Kings, an American hip hop group from Orange County, California

== Albums ==
=== Studio albums ===
Release date	Title	Peak chart positions						
Release date	Title	US	US Indie	US Rap	US Rock	US Alt	US Taste	US Top Album
August 11, 1998	Royal Highness	—	—	—	—	—	—	—
June 27, 2000	High Society	65	—	—	—	—	—	65
October 9, 2001	Hidden Stash II: The Kream of the Krop	100	—	—	—	—	—	100
October 8, 2002	Rollin' Stoned	51	—	—	—	—	—	51
April 20, 2004	Fire It Up	42	4	—	—	—	—	42
May 31, 2005	Kottonmouth Kings	50	2	21	—	—	—	50
June 6, 2006	Koast II Koast	39	3	19	14	—	—	39
August 28, 2007	Cloud Nine	44	3	10	14	14	13	44
October 28, 2008	The Green Album	42	1	5	13	10	—	42
April 20, 2010	Long Live the Kings	26	3	3	6	4	—	26
July 19, 2011	Sunrise Sessions	46	7	8	—	—	—	46
August 14, 2012	Mile High	36	9	7	10	10	—	36
August 28, 2015	Krown Power	—	17	8	—	—	—	100
April 20, 2018	Kingdom Come	—	—	—	—	—	—	—
"—" denotes releases that did not chart.

== Compilation, remix, and live albums ==
Year	Details	Peak chart positions		
Year	Details	200	US Indie	Rap
1999	Hidden Stash: Released: October 26, 1999	—	—	—
2003	Green Is Gold: 2003 Promo CD	—	—	—
2003	Classic Hits Live: Released: August 12, 2003	—	—	—
2004	The Kottonmouth Xperience: Released: November 16, 2004	—	31	—
2005	Joint Venture: Released: November 15, 2005	193	13	—
2006	Hidden Stash III: Released: November 21, 2006	199	12	—
2008	Greatest Highs: Released: January 15, 2008	168	—	—
2008	The Kottonmouth Xperience Vol. II: Kosmic Therapy: Released: April 15, 2008	—	—	—
2009	Rollin' Down the Highway: Released: September 15, 2009	—	—	—
2009	Hidden Stash 420: Released: October 13, 2009	103	11	21
2011	Hidden Stash 5: Bongloads & B-Sides: Released: November 8, 2011	—	—	—
2015	High Standards & Greatest Hits	—	—	—
2018	The Harvest: Released: October 26, 2018; Label: KingMaker Kannabis; Format: CD, Digital	—	—	—
"—" denotes releases that did not chart.				

== EP releases ==
Released	Album Title
February 24, 1998	Stoners Reeking Havoc
March 10, 1999	Stash Box
May 9, 2006	Nickel Bag
April 20, 2009	420 Freedom Sampler
April 19, 2011	Legalize It EP
April 20, 2014	The Buddah Shack
May 22nd, 2026	California Burning

== Singles ==
Release date	Title	Album
1998	Dog's Life	Royal Highness
1998	Life Ain't What It Seems/Suburban Life	Royal Highness
1999	Bump	Royal Highness
2000	Peace Not Greed	High Society
2000	The Lottery	High Society
2000	Day Dreamin' Fazes	High Society
2001	On The Run	Hidden Stash II: The Kream of the Krop
2002	Positive Vibes	Rollin' Stoned
2004	Bad Habits	Fire It Up
2004	Angry Youth	Fire It Up
June 9, 2006	Pimpin' Lessons	Nickel Bag/Hidden Stash III
May 3, 2011	Same Place	Non-album single
June 7, 2011	Love Lost	Sunrise Sessions
June 28, 2011	Boom Clap Sound (feat. Chris Webby)	Sunrise Sessions
September 27, 2011	Cruizin': Remixes	Sunrise Sessions
December 13, 2011	Jingle Bowls	Non-album single
April 4, 2012	Watch Out (feat. Twiztid): Released exclusively through KMK's website	Mile High
April 17, 2012	Hold It In	Mile High
July 10, 2012	Mr Cali Man (feat. Ceekay Jones & Saint Dog)	Mile High

=== Nugg of the Week ===
On April 20, 2011, the Kottonmouth Kings began featuring a "Nugg of the Week" on their website: a song (and on one occasion, an EP) available for free download. The Nugg of the Week is usually posted on Tuesday, Wednesday, or Thursday and is available for approximately a week before being replaced by another song. These songs consist of a-sides, b-sides, remixes, solo tracks by Kottonmouth Kings members, and collaborations with other artists. The following list only includes material that was previously unreleased when it was first made available as a Nugg of the Week.

Week	Artist	Title	Notes
4/20/2011	Kottonmouth Kings	"Love Lost"	Later released on Sunrise Sessions
4/26/2011	Kottonmouth Kings	"Party Monsters (After Hours Mix)"	Later released on Hidden Stash V: Bongloads & B-Sides
5/3/2011	Kottonmouth Kings	"Life for Me"	Later released as a bonus track on the Best Buy edition of Sunrise Sessions and on Hidden Stash V: Bongloads & B-Sides
5/10/2011	DJ Bobby B	"420 Mix"	
5/17/2011	Kottonmouth Kings	"Proud to be a Stoner (Reprise)"	Original mix appears on Cloud Nine
5/24/2011	Kottonmouth Kings	"Legalize It"	Previously released as a free download prior to the 2010 election in support of Proposition 19. Later released a bonus track on the Hastings edition of Sunrise Sessions and on Hidden Stash V: Bongloads & B-Sides.
6/21/2011	Kottonmouth Kings	"New World Stoner"	Later released on a Sunrise Sessions pre-order bonus disc, and on Hidden Stash V: Bongloads & B-Sides.
6/28/2011	Kottonmouth Kings	"Summertime"	Later released on a Sunrise Sessions pre-order bonus disc, and on Hidden Stash V: Bongloads & B-Sides.
7/5/2011	Kottonmouth Kings	"Reefer Madness (Smoked Out Mix)"	Later released on Hidden Stash V: Bongloads & B-Sides.
7/12/2011	D-Loc	"Smoke U Out"	Later released on D-Loc's Weedman EP as "Smoke Out"
7/26/2011	Kottonmouth Kings	"Cruizin (Sunsplash Remix)"	Later released on the digital single Cruizin: Remixes, and on Hidden Stash V: Bongloads & B-Sides
8/9/2011	Kottonmouth Kings	"Kalifornia (Westcoast Remix)"	Later released on Hidden Stash V: Bongloads & B-Sides.
9/6/2011	Kottonmouth Kings	"Legalize It (Dub Mix)"	
9/20/2011	Daddy X	"Family-N-Friends"	SRH Presents: Supporting Radical Habits (Japanese version)
9/27/2011	Kottonmouth Kings	"Summatime (Steve Dang Remix)"	
10/4/2011	Kottonmouth Kings	"Stoned Silly (P-Nice Dub)"	Original mix appears on Sunrise Sessions
10/18/2011	Kottonmouth Kings	"Down 4 Life (Heavy Remix)"	Later released on the Subnoize Souljaz album Underground Collabos
10/25/2011	Johnny Richter & Chucky Styles	"Destination Unknown"	Later released on the Subnoize Souljaz album Underground Collabos
11/1/2011	Kottonmouth Kings	"Shining Down"	
11/8/2011	Kottonmouth Kings	"Medicine Man (Remix)"	
12/13/2011	Kottonmouth Kings	"High n Mighty"	
12/20/2011	Kottonmouth Kings	"Damage Done"	
1/10/2012	Kottonmouth Kings	"Party Down"	
1/31/2012	D-Loc	"Look At Me Now"	D-Loc's rendition of "Look at Me Now" by Chris Brown
2/14/2012	The Dirtball	"Hustlin (Remix)"	The Dirtball's remix of Candyland's dubstep remix of "Hustlin'" by Rick Ross
3/27/2012	The Dirtball	"Tried Trued & Tested (Statutory Ray Remix)" (feat. Boondox)	Original mix appears on The Dirtball's album Crook County
5/15/2012	Kottonmouth Kings	"The Next Episode"	The Kottonmouth Kings' rendition of "The Next Episode" by Dr. Dre (feat. Snoop Dogg, Kurupt, and Nate Dogg)
7/10/2012	Johnny Richter	"Good Pot 2"	
10/16/2012	D-Loc	"Kush (Remix)"	D-Loc's rendition of "Kush" by Dr. Dre (feat. Snoop Dogg and Akon)
1/8/2013	D-Loc	"Smoke Somethin'"	D-Loc's rendition of "Function" by E-40 (feat. YG, Iamsu! and Problem)
4/23/2013	Imperial Soundclash	"I Love Don't Run"	
4/30/2013	D-Loc	"Dab City (Remix)"	D-Loc's rendition of "Rack City" by Tyga
5/14/2013	The Dirtball (feat. Daddy X)	"Robbery"	
7/23/2013	Kottonmouth Kings	"Sweet Leaf"	
4/20/2014	Kottonmouth Kings	The Buddah Shack EP	All five songs from this EP were later released on the deluxe edition of Krown Power
4/20/2015	Kottonmouth Kings	"Ganja Glow" (feat. Marlon Asher)	Later released on Krown Power

== Appearances on albums by multiple artists ==
Album title	Released
Scream 2: Music from the Dimension Motion Picture	November 18, 1997
Sno-Core Compilation	March 10, 1998
Out of the Darkness, Into the Light	June 16, 1998
SRH Presents: Lose Your Illusions, Vol. 1	October 6, 1998
Lost & Found	May 4, 1999
Race Riot	July 18, 2000
Take a Bite Outta Rhyme: A Rock Tribute to Rap	October 24, 2000
Straight out of Cypress	May 29, 2001
Suburban Noize Presents: Sounds of Things to Come	April 20, 2002
SRH Presents: Spaded, Jaded, and Faded	October 29, 2002
Green Is Gold	2003
Big Air Experience	March 25, 2003
The Real Cancun	May 13, 2003
Suburban Noize Presents: Sub-Noize Rats	September 2, 2003
The Royal Family	August 10, 2004
Sub Noize Souljaz	February 15, 2005
SRH Presents: Supporting Radical Habits	October 25, 2005
Suburban Noize Presents: Underground Vault	2006
Droppin Bombs	August 29, 2006
Evil Bong	October 31, 2006
SRH Presents: Supporting Radical Habits Vol. II	April 3, 2007
Strange Noize	July 7, 2007
Strange Noize 2008	July 30, 2008
Kingmaker presents.. The Harvest	2018

== Guest appearances ==
Year	Title	Album	Artist	Performers
1998	Pumpkin Carver	Hallowicked 1998 (single)	Insane Clown Posse	Insane Clown Posse, Twiztid & Kottonmouth Kings
2003	Thug Pit	Hallowicked 2003 (single)	Insane Clown Posse	Insane Clown Posse, Tech N9ne, Bone Thugs-n-Harmony, Esham & Kottonmouth Kings
2007	"Wind Me Up"	Insomnia	(Hed) P.e.	
2007	"We Can Smoke"	More to Hate	Big B	
2008	"I Am Everything"	Killer	Tech N9ne	Tech N9ne, Hed pe & Kottonmouth Kings
2009	"Higher Ground"	New World Orphans	(Hed) P.e.	
2009	"Stoner Bitch"	Pipe Dreams	Potluck	
2010	"Ridin' The Whip"	Gang Rags	Blaze Ya Dead Homie	
2010	"Damn Bitch (Remix)"	Psychopathic Murder Mix Volume 2	Mike E. Clark	Blaze Ya Dead Homie featuring Kottonmouth Kings
2012	"Pass It To The Sky"	Mike E. Clark's Extra Pop Emporium	Insane Clown Posse	
2013	"In The Clouds"	A World Upside Down: The Mixxtape	DJ Clay	

== Videography ==
Year	Title	Album
1997	"Suburban Life"	Royal Highness
1998	"Dog's Life"	Royal Highness
1998	"Play On"	Royal Highness
1999	"Bump" (Note: The music video features the radio edit that only appears on some editions of the album.)	Royal Highness
1999	"Bump" (Alternate Live Version)	Royal Highness
1999	"Dog's Life"(Alternate Version)	Royal Highness
1999	"Pimp Twist"	Hidden Stash
2000	"Peace Not Greed"	High Society
2000	"The Lottery"	High Society
2000	"Kings Blend"	High Society
2000	"Day Dreamin' Fazes"	High Society
2001	"Dyin' Daze"	Hidden Stash II: The Kream of the Krop
2001	"Life Rolls On"	Hidden Stash II: The Kream of the Krop
2002	"Sleepers"	Rollin' Stoned
2002	"Full Throttle"	Rollin' Stoned
2002	"Enjoy"	Rollin' Stoned
2002	"Positive Vibes"	Rollin' Stoned
2002	"Zero Tolerance"	Rollin' Stoned
2002	"Rest of My Life"	Rollin' Stoned
2002	"Sub-Noize Rats"	Rollin' Stoned
2002	"Strange Daze"	Rollin' Stoned
2002	"Endles Highway"	Rollin' Stoned
2002	"Outcast"	Rollin' Stoned
2002	"Zero Tolerance"	Rollin' Stoned
2002	"Waking Dream"	Rollin' Stoned
2004	"Bring It On"	Fire It Up
2004	"Outcast"	Fire It Up
2004	"Angry Youth"(2 Different Versions)	Fire It Up
2004	"Ur Done"	Fire It Up
2005	"King Klick"	Kottonmouth Kings no.7
2005	"Make It Hot"	Kottonmouth Kings no.7
2005	"Peace Of Mind"	Kottonmouth Kings no.7
2005	"Put It Down" feat Cypress Hill	Kottonmouth Kings no.7
2005	"SRH"	Joint Venture
2006	"Bong Toke/Where's The Weed At"	Koast II Koast
2006	"Friends"	Koast II Koast
2006	"Everybody Move"	Koast II Koast
2006	"Neva Stop"	Koast II Koast
2006	"Koast 2 Koast"	Koast II Koast
2006	"Gone Git High"	Hidden Stash III
2007	"Livin' Proof"	Cloud Nine
2007	"Think 4 Yourself"	Cloud Nine
2007	"City 2 City"	Cloud Nine
2008	"Free Willy"	Cloud Nine
2008	"Pack Your Bowls"	The Green Album
2008	"Where I'm Goin'?"	The Green Album
2009	"K.O.T.T.O.N.M.O.U.T.H. Song"	The Green Album
2009	"Pack Your Bowls (420 Special version)"	The Green Album
2009	"Tangerine Sky (Non-trippy version)"	Hidden Stash 420
2009	"D Iz Who I B (D-Loc solo)"	Hidden Stash 420
2009	"Evolution (Johnny Richter solo)	Hidden Stash 420
2010	"Stomp/Rampage Medley"	Long Live The Kings
2010	"Stomp"	Long Live The Kings
2010	"Rampage"	Long Live The Kings
2010	"Great When You're High"	Long Live The Kings
2011	"Reefer Madness"	Long Live The Kings
2011	"My Garden"	Legalize It (EP)
2011	"Defy Gravity"	Legalize It (EP)
2011	"Love Lost"	Sunrise Sessions
2011	"Boom Clap Sound"	Sunrise Sessions
2012	"Watch Out"	Mile High
2012	"Hold It In"	Mile High
2012	"Boombox"	Mile High
2012	"Get Out The Way"	Mile High
2012	"Mr. Cali Man" (ft. Saint Dog & Ceekay)	Mile High
2012	"Pound 4 Pound"	Mile High
2013	"Green Dreams (Mile High)"	Mile High
2013	"Roll Us A Joint"	Mile High
2014	"Buddha Headz"	The Buddah Shack
2015	"Ganja Glow"	Krown Power
2015	"Pump Up Da Bass"	Krown Power
2015	"Sink Or Swim"	Krown Power
2015	"Audio War"	Krown Power
2015	"Kronitron"	Krown Power
2015	"Walk The Line"	Krown Power
2018	Smoke Weed With Me	Kingdom Come
2018	Loyalty Is Royalty	Kingdom Come
