= Hidden Stash III =

Compilation album by Kottonmouth Kings
- Released: November 21, 2006
- Recorded: 2005–2006
- Label: Suburban Noize
- Producer: Brad Daddy X

Kottonmouth Kings chronology
Koast II Koast (2006)	Hidden Stash III (2006)	Cloud Nine (2007)

Professional ratings
Review scores
Source	Rating
AllMusic	3/5 stars

Hidden Stash III is the second B-sides and rarities collection from the Kottonmouth Kings, released on November 21, 2006, and is a 3-disc CD-DVD combo. The album peaked at No. 199 on the Billboard 200 and No. 12 on the Top Independent Albums chart for the week of December 9, 2006. The album is composed of B-sides, remixes, solo tracks from Kottonmouth Kings members, and songs by other artists that feature guest appearances by Kottonmouth Kings members.

== Track listing ==
=== Disc one ===
#	Title	Featured artist	Length	Original release
1	Gone Git High	Kottonmouth Kings	4:14	Hidden Stash III
2	Still Smokin'	Kottonmouth Kings (feat. Saint Dog)	4:01	Droppin Bombs
3	Feels So Good	D-Loc	3:31	Droppin Bombs
4	Things I Do, Pt. 2	Johnny Richter	3:14	SRH Presents: Supporting Radical Habits
5	The Underground	Big B (feat. Daddy X)	3:20	White Trash Renegade by Big B
6	That's How It Goes	Kingspade	3:35	Hidden Stash III
7	Chronic Weed	Judge D (feat. Johnny Richter)	3:13	No Compromize by Judge D (as "Kronik")
8	Legalize or Legal Lies	Daddy X & Pakelika	2:41	Hidden Stash III
9	Dust to Dust	D-Loc & Judge D	3:11	Subnoize Souljaz
10	Police Story	Kottonmouth Kings	4:30	SRH Presents: Spaded, Jaded, & Faded
11	One Life	Daddy X, Johnny Richter & Judge D	4:07	Droppin Bombs
12	Pimpin' Lessons	Kottonmouth Kings	3:19	Nickel Bag EP
13	Set Me Free	Daddy X & Saint Dog	4:14	Droppin Bombs
14	Karma	Kottonmouth Kings	4:00	Hidden Stash III
15	Hit That	Big B (feat. Johnny Richter)	3:34	White Trash Renegade by Big B
16	The Bomb	Daddy X	3:36	Family Ties by Daddy X
17	Same Ole Story	The Dirtball (feat. Daddy X)	3:00	Raptillion by The Dirtball
18	My Selecta	DJ Bobby B (feat. Dog Boy and Kona Gold)	6:19	SRH Presents: Spaded, Jaded, & Faded

=== Disc two ===
#	Title	Featured artist	Length	Original release
1	Hidden Stash	Kottonmouth Kings	3:38	Hidden Stash III
2	Keep a Lookout	D-Loc, Johnny Richter, and Judge D	3:58	Subnoize Souljaz
3	Somethin 4 Your Stereo	Saint Dog (feat. Daddy X)	4:47	USA (Unconformable Social Amputees) by Saint Dog (as "Subnoize Anthem")
4	Stick Together (Remix)	Kottonmouth Kings	4:35	Hidden Stash III
5	Last Daze	Daddy X (feat. Dog Boy and Big B)	3:24	Family Ties by Daddy X
6	Let's Ride	Kottonmouth Kings	2:47	Subnoize Souljaz
7	Remember Me	Big B (feat. D-Loc)	3:10	White Trash Renegade by Big B (as "Remember")
8	The Lottery (Stackin' Chips Remix)	Kottonmouth Kings	5:00	The Lottery Remixes
9	Batter Swang	The Dirtball (feat. Daddy X)	3:20	Raptillion by The Dirtball
10	Lady Killer	Johnny Richter	3:04	The Lottery Remixes
11	Losin' Streak	Daddy X and Judge D	2:54	Hidden Stash III
12	Flyin' High	Daddy X, Pakelika, Dirtball, and Chucky Styles	3:30	Droppin Bombs
13	Summertime	Johnny Richter, Big B, and Saint Dog	4:00	Subnoize Souljaz
14	Power Trippin'	Judge D (feat. Daddy X)	3:41	No Compromize by Judge D
15	Money	Daddy X	3:40	Family Ties by Daddy X
16	Rip N Tear	Daddy X, Chucky Styles, and Saint Dog	3:43	Hidden Stash III
17	Peace of Mind (Remix)	Kottonmouth Kings	3:46	Hidden Stash III
18	Wake N Bake	Daddy X	4:19	Family Ties by Daddy X

== Bonus DVD ==
#	Title	Featured artist	Length
1	Everybody Move	Kottonmouth Kings	4:20
2	It Feels So Good	D-Loc	3:35
3	Where's the Weed At?	Kottonmouth Kings	5:00
4	Put It Down	Kottonmouth Kings & Cypress Hill	4:17
5	Peace of Mind	Kottonmouth Kings	3:47
6	King Klick	Kottonmouth Kings	4:10
7	Neva Stop	Kottonmouth Kings	4:02
8	Enjoy (Live)	Kottonmouth Kings	3:47
9	Get Ready	Hed PE	3:03
10	Mayday	Subnoize Souljaz	4:21
11	Just Me	Dirtball	2:39
12	Uncle Sam	Subnoize Souljaz	5:05
13	Road Rage	Mower	2:00
14	Weapon X	X-Clan	2:58
15	Let Us Know	Subnoize Souljaz	3:39
16	Local Dub	Too Rude	3:48
17	My Show	Dirtball	3:12
18	Mindbender	Daddy X	3:25
19	White Trash Renegade	Big B	3:33
20	Party	OPM	3:43
21	Luffy (actual song name is for tonight)	OPM	3:07
22	Freedom	Daddy X & Corporate Avenger	5:47
23	Lou Dog Presents "Koast II Koast"	Kottonmouth Kings	8:01

== Charts ==
Chart (2006)	Peak position
US Billboard 200	199

== Personnel ==
- Daddy X – Vocals, Lyrics
- D-Loc – Vocals, Lyrics
- Johnny Richter – Vocals, Lyrics
- Lou Dogg – Drums, Percussion
- DJ Bobby B – Engineer, DJ, Programmer, Turntables
- Pakelika – Vocals, Lyrics ("Leagalize Or Legal Lies", "Flyin' High")
- Saint Dog – Vocals, Lyrics ("Still Smokin'", "Set Me Free", "Somethin' 4 Your Stereo", "Summertime" "Rip N Tear")
- Big B – Vocals, Lyrics ("The Underground", "Hit That", "Last Daze", "Remember Me", "Summertime")
- Judge D – Vocals, Lyrics ("Chronic Weed", "Dust To Dust", "One Life", "Keepa Lookout", "Remember Me", "Losin' Streak", "Power Trippin'")
- Dog Boy – Vocals, Lyrics ("My Selecta")
- The Dirtball – Vocals, Lyrics ("Batter Swang", "Flyin' High")
- Chucky Styles – Vocals, Lyrics ("Rip N Tear")
