= In the OPMDEN =

In The OPMDEN

EP by OPM
- Released: June 18, 2006
- Recorded: 2006
- Length: 23:00
- Label: Suburban Noize Records
- Producer: OPM

OPM chronology
ForThemAsses (2004)	In The OPMDEN (2006)	California Poppy (2006)

In The OPMDEN is the second EP by OPM. It was released on June 18, 2006 by Suburban Noize Records, exactly a month prior to their album California Poppy. The EP features reggae artist Yellowman and a cover of The Clash's 1980 hit Bankrobber.

== Track listing ==
1. "Eternity" (Featuring Yellowman) - 3:41
2. "Battle Rhyme" (Featuring Big B) - 4:53
3. "Set Me Free" - 5:50
4. "Bank Robber" - 4:16
5. "Eternity (Rude Mix)" (Featuring Yellowman) - 3:51

== Personnel ==
- John E. Necro - Lead vocals
- Geoff Turney - Guitar
- Jonathan Williams - Keys
- Matt Rowe - Bass
- Robert Bradley - Drums
- Big B - Vocals
