= Hidden Stash V: Bongloads & B-Sides =

Hidden Stash 5: Bong Loads & B-Sides

Compilation album by Kottonmouth Kings
- Released: November 8, 2011
- Length: 76:32
- Label: Suburban Noize Records

Kottonmouth Kings chronology
| Sunrise Sessions (2011) | Hidden Stash 5: Bong Loads & B-Sides (2011) | Mile High (2012) |

Hidden Stash V: Bong Loads & B-Sides is the fourth b-sides and rarities collection by the Kottonmouth Kings. It contains b-sides and remixes from the albums Long Live The Kings (2010) and Sunrise Sessions (2011). Unlike Hidden Stash III and Hidden Stash 420, Hidden Stash V does not contain songs by other artists that feature Kottonmouth Kings members. Certain versions of the album include a bonus DVD that includes pranks, music videos, and revisions.

== Track listing ==
| # | Title | Time | Original Release |
|---|---|---|---|
| 1 | Rise Above | 4:05 | Legalize It EP |
| 2 | Boom Clap Sound (feat. Chris Webby) | 5:17 | Hidden Stash 5 |
| 3 | Dead 'N' Gone | 4:16 | Long Live The Kings (Deluxe Edition) |
| 4 | Life for Me | 5:23 | Sunrise Sessions (Best Buy edition)* |
| 5 | Down 4 Life (Smash Remix) | 4:50 | Hidden Stash 5 |
| 6 | Back in Cali | 4:32 | Sunrise Sessions (Best Buy edition) |
| 7 | Kalifornia (West Coast Remix) | 4:06 | Hidden Stash 5* |
| 8 | Legalize it | 5:36 | Sunrise Sessions (Hastings edition)* |
| 9 | All I Need (Supersonic Remix) | 3:45 | Hidden Stash 5 |
| 10 | Party Monster (After Hour Mix) | 5:04 | Hidden Stash 5* |
| 11 | Soon Come | 4:49 | Legalize It EP |
| 12 | Reefer Madness (Smoked Out Mix) | 4:29 | Hidden Stash 5* |
| 13 | New World Stoners | 4:43 | Sunrise Sessions (KMK official store pre-order bonus disc)* |
| 14 | Enjoy the Ride | 3:35 | Long Live The Kings (Deluxe Edition) |
| 15 | Cruizin' (Sunsplash Remix) | 4:08 | Cruizin': Remixes (Digital Single)* |
| 16 | Summertime | 3:28 | Sunrise Sessions (KMK official store pre-order bonus disc)* |
| 17 | Life is Beautiful | 4:26 | Long Live The Kings (Deluxe Edition) |

*These songs were released as a Nugg of the Week (limited time free download on the Kottonmouth Kings official website) prior to appearing on the indicated retail release.

=== DVD ===
1. Stonetown Intro
2. Pot shot #1
3. Love Lost
4. Pot shot#2
5. Cruisin’
6. Pot shot #3
7. Boom Clap Sound
8. Pot shot #4
9. My Garden
10. Pot shot #5
11. Reefer Madness
12. Pot Shot #6
13. Mushrooms
14. D Iz Who I B
15. At it Again
16. Amerika's Most Busted Part 1
17. Great when you’re high
18. KMK Live Bust
19. No Cops
20. Amerika's Most Busted Part 2
21. Stomp /Rampage
22. Defy Gravity
23. Party Girls
24. Pack Your Bowls
25. Suffocation
26. Say goodbye (Tangerine Sky)
27. Bonus Blue Skies - 30 minutes
28. Bonus: Underground Revolution trailer
