= SRH Presents: Supporting Radical Habits Vol. II =

Compilation album
- Released: April 3, 2007
- Recorded: 2006–2007
- Genre: Rap; Hip hop Alternative rock
- Label: Suburban Noize
- Producer: Brad "Daddy X", Mike Kumagai, Patrick "P-Nice" Shevelin

SRH Presents: Supporting Radical Habits Vol. II is the seventh official compilation album by Suburban Noize Records released on April 3, 2007. SRH Clothing and Suburban Noize Records teamed up again to release the second SRH “Supporting Radical Habits” CD/DVD compilation. This CD/DVD features music from Kottonmouth Kings, NOFX, Tech N9ne, Slightly Stoopid, and Sen Dog of Cypress Hill among many others. The DVD features over an hour of SRH riders which include; Mike Metzger, Vince Alessi, Josh Lewan, Jeremy Sommerville, Greg Domingo, Zach Peakock, Scottie Stephens, Grant Teel, Scummy, Manley, Thomas Hancock, Sean Doucett, James Lovette, Jim McNeil, Joe Crimo, Wes Agee, Jeremy Fulmer and more of the Subnoize and SRH members.

== Track listing ==
#	Title	Featured Artist	Time
1	On The Western Front	D.I.	2:13
2	Runnin' Things	Kottonmouth Kings	3:34
3	Riot Maker	Tech N9ne	5:19
4	Road Rage	Mower Ft. Saint Dog	1:46
5	Seeing Double at the Triple	NoFX	2:09
6	Babylon Madness	Dog Boy	3:11
7	Livin by the Gun	Danny Diablo	4:05
8	Da Shit	Kingspade	3:33
9	Thinkin Bout Cops	Slightly Stoopid	2:41
10	Nite Club In Bali	(həd) p.e.	2:13
11	Gotta Get Mine	Potluck	3:56
12	Don't Go (Sen Dog of Cypress Hill)	SX10	4:09
13	Get Em Up feat. Jared of (həd) p.e., Big B and Daddy X	Subnoize Souljaz	4:28
14	Hardest Artist	The Dirtball	3:03
15	Let Dem Hos Fight	Fishbone	2:42
16	Higher Than A Motherfucker Ft. Johnny Richter, Big B	OPM	5:41
17	As I Come Back	Big Left	2:44
18	Mind Yo Biz	Chucky Styles	3:36
19	Real Recognizes Real ft. Ice-T and Jamey Jasta	Ice Pick	3:57
20	All I Ever	The Dirtball and Big B	3:29
21	At The Top	Last Laugh	4:16
22	No Regrets	Authority Zero	2:27
