= Big B Presents: Random Stuff =

Randum Stuff

Compilation album by Big B
- Released: October 8, 2006
- Recorded: 2006
- Genre: Hip hop
- Length: 1:19:17
- Label: Suburban Noize Records
- Producer: Kevin Zinger (exec.); Daddy X (exec.)

Big B chronology
White Trash Renegade (2004)	Randum Stuff (2006)	More to Hate (2007)

Random Stuff is a compilation album by American rapper Big B. It was released on October 8, 2006, via Suburban Noize Records. The album includes appearances by several fellow KMK and OPM members and is a CD/DVD set.

== CD track listing ==
#	Title	Guest artist	Time
1	The "B" is for Boring		3:15
2	Hooligan		3:19
3	White Trash Renegade		3:33
4	Mayday	The Dirtball and Daddy X	4:14
5	Summertime	Johnny Richter and Saint Dog	3:59
6	Somebody		3:46
7	Last Daze	Daddy X and Dogboy	3:23
8	Remember	D-Loc	3:10
9	Every MC	Chucky Styles	3:50
10	I Don't Wanna Die	Judge D and Johnny Richter	3:47
11	Whiteboys		3:45
12	Addicted		2:18
13	Half Empty (Remix)	Daddy X and D-Loc	3:01
14	The Crab Shack	Tsunami Bros., T.J. Lavin, Soulman and Milky	3:37
15	Representin	One Session and Johnny Richter	3:52
16	Kali Kings with OPM	Johnny Richter	4:33
17	This Is Robbery	John E. Necro	3:37
18	Watcha Want	Johnny Richter, The Dirtball, and T.J. Lavin	3:33
19	Higher Than a Motherfucker	John E. Necro and Johnny Richter	5:35
20	Tomatoes		3:06
21	Hey Joe		6:04

== DVD track listing ==
#	Title
1	Random Stuff Movie
2	White Trash Renegade Music Video
3	Mayday Music Video
4	Rollin' Music Video
5	Horney Music Video
6	Hooligan Music Video
7	Let Us Know Music Video
