= Stash Up =

Single by OPM

from the album Menace to Sobriety
- Released: 2001
- Recorded: 2000
- Length: 2:57
- Label: Atlantic
- Songwriters: Matthew Meschery, Geoff Turney, John Edney, Perry Farrell, Eric Avery, Lichelle Laws, Clive Bright
- Producer: Michael Patterson

OPM singles chronology
"El Capitan" (2001)	"Stash Up" (2001)	"Horny" (2005)

"Stash Up" is the third single released by OPM, and the final from the album Menace to Sobriety. It features samples of Jane's Addiction's "Mountain Song", Boss's "I Don't Give a Fuck", Tenor Saw's "Ring The Alarm" and "Gimmie The Loot" performed by The Notorious B.I.G. The song was featured on Kerrang!'s The Best of 2001 compilation. It was re-recorded in 2012 for the Heaven Can Wait EP.

== Music video ==
The music video was directed by Spencer Susser, who also directed the "El Capitan" video. The video shows the band attempting to escape from the police by; skateboarding, smashing windows, crashing cars, jumping fences and successfully escaping at the end by driving away in a getaway car. It received heavy airplay on Kerrang! TV during the early 2000s.

== Formats and track listings ==
CD, Maxi

1. "Stash Up" (Album version) – 2:57
2. "Stash Up" (Funk Food remix) – 2:57
3. "Stash Up" (What Version) (clean) – 2:57
4. "Heaven Is a Halfpipe" (original demo version) – 2:51

12"

- A1 "Stash Up" (album version) – 2:57
- A2 "Stash Up" (Funk Food remix) – 2:57
- B1 "Stash Up" (What Version) (clean) – 2:57
- B2 "Heaven Is a Halfpipe" (original demo version) – 2:51

== Charts ==
Chart performance for "Stash Up"
Chart (2001)	Peak position
Germany (GfK)	67
