= Horny (OPM song) =

Single by OPM

from the album ForThemAsses
- Released: 2005
- Recorded: 2004
- Length: 3:34
- Label: Suburban Noize Records
- Songwriters: John Edney, Geoff Turney, Bryan Mahoney, Nikki Sixx
- Producers: OPM, Steve Gallagher

OPM singles chronology
"Stash Up" (2001)	"Horny" (2005)	"Holiday Under the Sun" (2010)

"Horny" is the fourth single released by OPM, taken from the album ForThemAsses. It was released on Suburban Noize Records in 2005.

== Track listings ==
CD 1

1. "Horny" (clean edit) – 3:34
2. "Horny" (uncensored edit) – 3:34
3. "Conflict" – 4:09
4. "Horny" (video)

CD 2

1. "Horny" (clean edit) – 3:34
2. "Horny" (uncensored edit) – 3:34
3. "Rollin" – 3:49
4. "Horny" (video)

== Charts ==
Chart performance for "Horny"
Chart (2005)	Peak position
Australia (ARIA)	100
