= Soul Machine =

Soul Machine may refer to:

- Soul Machine (album), a 1995 album by The Denison/Kimball Trio
- Soul Machine (musician) Jérémie Palmigiani, French electronic music producer
- Cee-Lo Green... Is the Soul Machine album by Cee Lo Green 2004
- Soul Machine, album by Hungarian band The Trousers (band)
- Soul Machine, sole album of Richard Barbary produced by Creed Taylor 1968
- "Soul Machine", song by Black Stone Cherry from Kentucky (album) 2016
- "Soul Machine", The Salsoul Invention Late Night Tales Presents After Dark: Nightshift
- "Soul Machine", vintage rarities and non-album B-sides by the funk group The Meters Zony Mash
- Soul Machine: The Invention of the Modern Mind, a book by George Makari
