= SRH =

SRH may refer to:

- Scottish Radio Holdings
- Scottish Rail Holdings
- Sexual and reproductive health
- Shockley-Read-Hall recombination in solid-state physics
- Socialist Republic of Croatia
- Southern Rhodesia, obsolete UNDP country code
- Storm relative helicity in meteorology
- Streatham Hill railway station, London, National Rail station code SRH
- Sunrisers Hyderabad, an Indian cricket team
- SRH Presents: Supporting Radical Habits, a 2005 compilation album
