= Suburban Noize Presents: Sounds of Things to Come =

Compilation album by Suburban Noize Records
- Released: April 20, 2000
- Recorded: 1999–2000
- Genre: Rap; hip hop; alternative rock
- Label: Suburban Noize Records
- Producer: Brad "Daddy X"; Mike Kumagai; Patrick "P-Nice" Shevelin

Suburban Noize Records chronology
SRH Presents: Lose Your Illusions, Vol. 1 (1998)	Suburban Noize Presents: Sounds of Things to Come (2000)	SRH Presents: Spaded, Jaded, and Faded (2002)

Suburban Noize Presents: Sounds of Things to Come is an official compilation album by Suburban Noize Records released on April 20, 2000. This album includes popular names of the label, such as the Kottonmouth Kings, Dogboy, and Saint Dog along with others.

== Track listing ==
#	Title	Featured artist	
1	Dog's Life (Remix) Ft. Dogboy	Kottonmouth Kings	5:33
2	V.A.N.A.C.	Grand Vanacular and DJ Circa	3:33
3	Burn Kali	Too Rude	4:46
4	Inland Empire Ft. Saint Dog	DJ Bobby B	2:25
5	Lady Killer	Johnny Richter	3:07
6	Phony Microphonist	Grand Vanacular and DJ Circa	2:49
7	Drug Dealing God	Corporate Avenger	2:58
8	Never Fuck With Me	Sub-Tear-Reign'n	2:06
9	Bomb Homegrown Ft. D-Loc	DJ Bobby B	1:30
10	Gunshot	Too Rude	3:52
11	They Can't Diss Miss	Addverse	3:27
12	GameFaceVision	GameFaceVision	0:39
13	American Dream	Humble Gods	2:09
14	Part Time	Mix Mob	3:13
15	Confessions to the Sold Out M.C.	Sub-Tear-Reign'n	3:02
16	Sitting on the Hill	The Upbeats	4:48
17	Ordinary Daze	S.W.A.T.	3:20
18	Still The Same	Big Hoss	3:06
