= El Capitan (OPM song) =

2000 song by Californian-based band OPM

Single by OPM

from the album Menace to Sobriety
- Released: 2001
- Recorded: 2000
- Length: Album Version - 3:25 SoulChild Remix - 3:31
- Label: Atlantic
- Songwriter(s): Matthew Meschery, Geoff Turney, John Edney
- Producer(s): Michael Patterson

OPM singles chronology
"Heaven Is a Halfpipe" (2000)	"El Capitan" (2001)	"Stash Up" (2001)

"El Capitan" is the second single by American rock band OPM. The original version was featured on their debut studio album, Menace to Sobriety. It went on to chart at number 20 on the UK Singles Top 40. It was written about the band's favorite rum. The song was also remixed by Damien Mendis and Stuart Bradbury of SoulChild. It was re-recorded in 2012 for the Heaven Can Wait EP.

== Music video ==
Directed by Spencer Susser (who also directed the "Stash Up" video). It shows the band showing up to the aftermath of a massive house party with teens passed out and hungover in every room of the house. It shows a woman waking up to puke in a toilet and the explicit version shows a male urinating in a sink at the end of the video.

== Formats and track listings ==
CD maxi

1. "El Capitan" (Soulchild remix) – 3:31
2. "El Capitan" (album version) – 3:25
3. "Undercover Freak" (007 version) – 3:28

UK CD single, promo

1. "El Capitan" (Soulchild radio remix) (clean) – 3:31

CD single, promo

1. "El Capitan" (Soulchild remix) (dirty) – 3:31
2. "El Capitan" (Soulchild remix) (clean) – 3:31

== Charts ==
Chart performance for "El Capitan"
Chart (2002)	Peak position
Australia (ARIA)	76
Germany (GfK)	71
UK Singles (OCC)	20
