= Heaven Can Wait (OPM EP) =

EP by OPM
- Released: September 22, 2012
- Genre: Rap rock, alternative rock
- Length: 18:00
- Label: MNO Records
- Producer: OPM

OPM chronology
Golden State of Mind (2008)	Heaven Can Wait (2012)	The Minge Dynasty (2015)

Heaven Can Wait is the third EP by OPM. It was released for digital download on September 22, 2012. It features 5 re-recorded songs and was released to celebrate 13 years since the band's formation.

== Track listing ==
1. "Run Away" - 3:42
2. "Heaven Is a Halfpipe" - 4:22
3. "El Capitan" - 3:29
4. "Stash Up" - 3:15
5. "Brighter Side" - 3:10

== Band Line-up ==
- John E. Necro - Lead vocals
- Geoff Turney - Guitar
- Jonathan Williams - Keys
- Matt Rowe - Bass
- Shane Mayo - Drums
