= American Underdog (album) =

Studio album by Big B
- Released: March 24, 2009
- Genre: Hip hop
- Length: 1:00:03
- Label: Suburban Noize Records
- Producers: Kevin Zinger (exec.); Daddy X; Scott Russo

Big B chronology
More to Hate (2007)	American Underdog (2009)	Good Times & Bad Advice (2010)

Professional ratings
Review scores
Source	Rating
RapReviews	6.5/10

American Underdog is the fourth studio album by American rapper Big B. It was released on March 24, 2009 via Suburban Noize Records. The album features guest appearances from Scott Russo of Unwritten Law, Jared of Hed PE, and Kottonmouth Kings members Daddy X, John E. Necro, Johnny Richter and The Dirtball.

== Track listing ==
1. "To the Moon" - 3:00
2. "Hot Woman" (featuring The Dirtball) - 3:01
3. "Criminals" - 3:49
4. "Fucked in Vegas" - 0:07
5. "Life Lessons" - 3:16
6. "Drink More" (featuring Johnny Richter) - 3:23
7. "Sinner" (featuring Scott Russo) - 3:34
8. "Let it Rain" - 3:39
9. "Supastar" (featuring Daddy X) - 3:38
10. "Born to Ride" (featuring Jared) - 3:30
11. "Trouble" - 3:08
12. "Play These Cards" - 3:55
13. "Money" (featuring John E. Necro) - 3:34
14. "Sunday" - 3:16
15. "Tattooed Queen” - 3:31
16. "Gotta Do" - 4:06
17. "Let's Go Play" - 3:42
18. "Hi Dad" - 0:13
19. "In My City" - 3:40

== Chart history ==
Chart (2009)	Peak position
US Heatseekers Albums (Billboard)	24
