= California poppies =

California poppy, Eschscholzia californica, is a species of plant and the state flower of California.

California poppies may refer to:

- other species in the genus Eschscholzia that are also popularly called California poppy
- California Poppies, the British speedway team
- California Poppy (album), the 2006 album by OPM

== See also ==
- California Poppy Reserve, or the Antelope Valley California Poppy Reserve
