= Stash Box =

EP by Kottonmouth Kings
- Released: March 10, 1999
- Recorded: 1998
- Label: Suburban Noize Records
- Producer: Brad Daddy X

Kottonmouth Kings chronology
Royal Highness (1998)	Stash Box (1999)	Hidden Stash (1999)

Stash Box is the second EP-CD from the Kottonmouth Kings released only in Japan to support the upcoming Japanese tour. The CD was released on March 10, 1999. "Dog's Life" was taken from the release ROYAL HIGHNESS and the rest of the songs were released later in the year on the album Hidden Stash.

== Track listing ==
#	Title	Guest artist	Length
1	Dog's Life	Dog Boy	4:26
2	Frontline		5:30
3	1605 Life		3:36
4	Roll It Up		4:02
5	Three Horny Devils		4:27
6	Love Songs		4:12
7	Old (So High)		4:19
8	Shouts Going Out		4:32

== Personnel ==
- Daddy X – Vocals, Lyrics
- D-Loc – Vocals, Lyrics
- Saint Dog – Vocals, Lyrics
- Lou Dogg – Drums, Percussion
- DJ Bobby B – DJ, Turntables
