= Reinvention =

Reinvention may refer to:

- Reinvention (Superchick album), 2010
- Reinvention, a 1999 album by Crumbächer

== See also ==
- Re-Invention, a 2004 album by Too Rude
- Re-Invention World Tour, a 2004 concert tour by Madonna
- Da Derrty Versions: The Reinvention, a 2003 album by Nelly
- Reinventing You, a 2013 book by executive education professor Dorie Clark
- Reinvention method, a business methodology used by an educator Dr. Nadya Zhexembayeva
- Re-inventing the wheel
