= Krown Power =

Studio album by Kottonmouth Kings
- Released: August 28, 2015
- Recorded: 2014–15
- Genre: Rap rock
- Length: 1:16:01
- Label: United Family Music
- Producer: Mike Kumagai; Jim Perkins; Steve Dang

Kottonmouth Kings chronology
Mile High (2012)	Krown Power (2015)	Kingdom Come (2018)

Professional ratings
Review scores
Source	Rating
Faygoluvers	3.89/5 stars

Krown Power is the thirteenth studio album by American hip hop group Kottonmouth Kings. It was released on August 28, 2015 through United Family Music. It features guest appearances from Marlon Asher, C4mula, Chucky Chuck, Dog Boy, Insane Clown Posse, Jahred, and member Saint Dog re-joining the group. A month later they released a deluxe version, which also featured contributions from Allensworth, Blaze Ya Dead Homie, (həd) ^{p.e.}, Judge D, Nicky Gritts, Pilot, Twiztid and Upso 1-2. The album peaked at number 100 on the Top Album Sales, number 17 on the Independent Albums and number 8 on the Top Rap Albums chart in the United States.

== Background ==
Since early/mid 2014, Kottonmouth Kings have been talking about their new album, and posting pictures on their social media accounts of them working on the album.

== Promotion ==
In early/mid 2014 KMK posted their first photo of the group together taking promo shots for the new album Krown Power. Since then they have continued to do so on all their social media accounts. They plan to go on tour to promote the album during the summer of 2015. On March 30, 2015 Daddy X posted a picture on his Facebook account saying that the album will now be released in June 2015, and will release a music video/single every month leading up to the release of the album. On April 20, 2015 the first music video was released titled, Ganja Glow. In late April/early May a short 18 second clip of the new music video titled Our City was released. It was announced in late May/early June that you could pre order the 18 song album. And in one of the packages you could pre order the album in included a bonus disc with 19 extra songs. On July 17, 2015 the album was made available for preorder, and the track list was revealed. On July 31, 2015 the second music video was released. KMK is working on music videos for the songs "Our City", "Pump Up Da Bass", "Ganja Glow", "Audio War" and "Permastoned".

== Music videos/singles ==
The first single was released on April 20, 2015, titled "Ganja Glow" and featuring United Family Music artist Marlon Asher. The end of the song featured a snippet of the song "Our City".

In May 2015 KMK posted pictures of the group shooting the video for the song "Our City". The second single was "Our City" and released the music video on July 31, 2015 also launching United Family Music's official web page.

In June 2015 KMK posted pictures of the group shooting the video for the song "Audio War". A few days into shooting the video KMK member Daddy X, and a crew member were injured during the shoot and delayed shooting for a few days.

A few weeks later KMK posted pictures of the group shooting a video for the song "Pump Up Da Bass". On August 5, 2015 KMK released the third single titled "Pump Up Da Bass" featuring Marlon Asher and was accompanied by a music video.

In late July KMK posted pictures of the group shooting a video for the song "Permastoned".

In early August KMK posted pictures of the group shooting a video for the song "Sink Or Swim".

On August 14, 2015 KMK released the new single titled "Kronitron".

== Track listing ==
No.	Title	Writer(s)	Length
1.	"Our City"	Brad Xavier; Dustin Miller; David Alexander; Michael Kumagai	4:04
2.	"Kronitron"	Xavier; Miller; Alexander; Kumagai	4:31
3.	"Audio War"	Xavier; Miller; Alexander; Kumagai	3:57
4.	"Permastone"	Xavier; Miller; Alexander; Kumagai	3:43
5.	"Pump Up Da Bass" (featuring Marlon Asher)	Xavier; Miller; Alexander; Marlon Asher; Kumagai; Dirk Freymuth	4:19
6.	"Keep It Movin'" (featuring Jahred of (həd) ^{p.e.})	Xavier; Miller; Alexander; Jared Gomes; Kumagai	4:13
7.	"Sink or Swim"	Xavier; Miller; Alexander; Kumagai; James Alexander Campanis Jr.	3:00
8.	"Fill Your Cup"	Xavier; Miller; Alexander; Steven David Fay	3:44
9.	"Don't Feel Down" (featuring Marlon Asher)	Xavier; Miller; Alexander; Asher; Kumagai	5:24
10.	"TBH" (featuring C4mula)	Xavier; Miller; Alexander; Andrew Bowman; Kumagai	4:50
11.	"Fuck Off" (featuring Insane Clown Posse)	Xavier; Miller; Alexander; Joseph Bruce; Joseph Utsler; Kumagai	4:07
12.	"Dope Thang"	Xavier; Miller; Alexander; Kumagai	4:12
13.	"Ganja Glow" (featuring Marlon Asher)	Xavier; Miller; Alexander; Asher; Josh Cardnali	4:09
14.	"Good Time Zone" (featuring Dogboy)	Xavier; Miller; Alexander; Robert Rogers; Kumagai	4:28
15.	"Crack the Frame" (featuring Chucky Chuck)	Xavier; Miller; Alexander; Charles Devries; Kumagai	4:49
16.	"Life in the Kingdom"	Xavier; Miller; Alexander; Kumagai; Freymuth	3:18
17.	"Mary Jane"	Xavier; Miller; Alexander; Kumagai; Freymuth	3:57
18.	"Time" (featuring Saint Dog)	Xavier; Miller; Alexander; Steve Thronson; Kumagai; Freymuth	5:17
Total length:			1:16:01

Deluxe edition
No.	Title	Performer(s)	Length
19.	"Eternal Speed"	Kottonmouth Kings and C4mula	3:23
20.	"Fuck Whatcha Heard"	Kottonmouth Kings and Saint Dog	4:06
21.	"Jump Over"	Kottonmouth Kings	4:13
22.	"Budda Headz"	Kottonmouth Kings	3:26
23.	"Walk the Line"	Kottonmouth Kings and C4mula	3:52
24.	"1 More Body"	Kottonmouth Kings, (həd) ^{p.e.}, Blaze Ya Dead Homie and Twiztid	5:16
25.	"Calling All"	Kottonmouth Kings	3:39
26.	"Burn It Down"	Kottonmouth Kings	3:45
27.	"Digital Flow"	Kottonmouth Kings and Allensworth	3:36
28.	"Let's Light It Up"	Kottonmouth Kings and Pilot	3:38
29.	"Summer Lovin'"	Upso 1-2, D-Loc and Judge D	3:07
30.	"Microphone Murdura"	The Dirtball	3:50
31.	"Laughing"	Chucky Chuck and Daddy X	2:54
32.	"Smoked Out"	D-Loc and Judge D	3:28
33.	"6:00 Am"	Pilot	2:48
34.	"Same Way"	C4mula, Nicky Gritts and Daddy X	4:11
35.	"Coming for You"	Allensworth and C4mula	3:29
36.	"Intoxifaded"	Chucky Chuck and C4mula	3:18
37.	"Passion Hustling"	Dogboy	3:14

== Personnel ==
- Daddy X – lyrics, vocals, production
- D-Loc – lyrics, vocals, production
- The Dirtball – lyrics, vocals, production
- Lou Dogg – drums, percussion
- Judge D – lyrics, backup vocals, production
- Marlon Asher – vocals, lyrics ("Pump Up Da Bass", "Don't Feel Down" & "Ganja Glow")
- Jared Gomes – vocals, lyrics ("Keep It Movin'")
- C4MULA – vocals, lyrics ("Tbh", "Eternal Speed", "Fuck Whatcha Heard", "Walk The Line", "Same Way", "Coming For You" & "Intoxifaded")
- Nicky Gritts – vocals, lyrics ("Same Way")
- Insane Clown Posse – vocals, lyrics ("Fuck Off")

=== Deluxe edition ===
- Daddy X – lyrics, vocals, production
- D-Loc – lyrics, vocals, production
- The Dirtball – lyrics, vocals, production
- Lou Dogg – drums, percussion
- C4Mula – lyrics, vocals ("Eternal Speed", "Walk The Line")
- Saint Dog – lyrics, vocals ("Fuck Whatcha Heard")
- Twiztid – lyrics, vocals ("1 More Body)
- Blaze Ya Dead Homie – ("1 More Body")
- Hed pe ("1 More Body")
- Allensworth – vocals, lyrics ("Digital Flow")
- Pilot Touhill – vocals, lyrics ("Let's Light Up")

=== Songs by other artists ===
- Upso12 – ("Summer Lovin'" ft. D-Loc & Judge D)
- The Dirtball – ("Microphone Murdura")
- Chucky Chuck ("Laughing" ft. Daddy X)
- D-Loc – ("Smoked Out" ft. Judge D)
- Pilot Touhill – ("6:00 am")
- C4MULA & Nicky Gritts – ("Same Way" ft. Daddy X)
- Allensworth & C4mula – ("Coming For You")
- C4mula – ("Intoxifaded" ft. Chucky Chuck)
- DJ Dogboy – ("Passion Hustling")

== Charts ==
Chart (2015)	Peak position
US Top Album Sales (Billboard)	100
US Independent Albums (Billboard)	17
US Top Rap Albums (Billboard)	8
