= X-Pistols =

American punk rock band

- Origin: Southern California/Oregon, U.S.
- Genres: Punk rock
- Years active: 2010–present
- Labels: Suburban Noize Records (2010—2013); United Family Music (2014—present)
- Members: Daddy X The Dirtball; TNT; Joey Glock; Colt Clayton
- Website: Official Page

X Pistols is an American punk rock band from Southern California and Oregon, United States, formed in 2010. Brad "Daddy X" Xavier (former Doggy Style frontman, Humble Gods and Kottonmouth Kings frontman), David "the Dirtball" Alexander (Kottonmoth Kings frontman), D.I. members TNT, Joey Glock, and Colt Clayton make up the band. In 2011, X-Pistols released their debut album Shoot to Kill, on Suburban Noize Records.

== Biography ==
In 2010, Daddy X and the Dirtball, along with D.I. members, TNT, Joey Glock, and Colt Clayton, formed the So Cal/Oregon punk rock X-Pistols. The band started when Daddy X was feeling an urge to revert to his old punk rock days, and wanted to do another punk band."There is always a punk element to what the Kottonmouth Kings do, but I’ve had a burning desire to press down on the throttle and open up the engine to my punk-rock roots." "Once I heard the Dirtball spit his venomous patterns on some punk, it was a wrap! I told him we need to do a whole record. The goal was to have fun, unleash some energy and take punk rock somewhere it had never been taken! I think we awoke a sleeping beast with this record."- Daddy X. The X-Pistols are signed to Suburban Noize Records, and January 18, 2011 they released their debut album Shoot to Kill. December 9, 2010 an advertisement video for their title track, Shoot to Kill was released world wide on YouTube. On the Kottonmouth Kings' 2010 album release, Long Live The Kings bonus disc, the X-Pistols song "P In the Punk" was released as a sneak peek.

== Discography ==
- Shoot to Kill - 2011 (Suburban Noize Records)

== Members ==
- Daddy X
- The Dirtball
- TNT (Eddie Tatar of D.I.)
- Joey Glock (Joe Tatar of D.I.)
- Colt Clayton (Clinton Calton of D.I.)
