= Hidden Stash =

Compilation album by Kottonmouth Kings
- Released: October 26, 1999
- Length: 47:06
- Label: Suburban Noize Records
- Producer: Brad Daddy X

Kottonmouth Kings chronology
Royal Highness (1998)	Hidden Stash (1999)	High Society (2000)

Hidden Stash is the first B-sides and rarities collection and second official album by the Kottonmouth Kings, released on October 26, 1999. Shortly after the release of their previous album, Royal Highness, Saint Dog left the group to pursue a career with his brother Big Hoss, who, according to the song "Big Hoss," was in prison at the time Royal Highness was made. To replace him, they called in original Kottonmouth King Johnny Richter, who was part of the group until 2013.

On September 15, 2009, Hidden Stash was re-issued with the "OG Dopeumentary" DVD as Double Dose V1, the first in a series of three double dose sets.

== Track listing ==
#	Title	Guest artist	Length	Original release
1	Frontline		5:30	Stoners Reeking Havoc EP
2	Old (So High)		4:45	Stash Box EP
3	Roll It Up		4:03	Stoners Reeking Havoc EP
4	Everyday		3:38	
5	1605 Life		3:37	Stoners Reeking Havoc EP
6	Love Songs		4:13	Stoners Reeking Havoc EP (vinyl version)
7	Shouts Going Out		4:32	Stash Box EP
8	Three Horny Devils		4:27	Stoners Reeking Havoc EP
9	Freaks		4:20	Stoners Reeking Havoc EP (vinyl version, as "Freaks of the Industry")
10*	Nightlife	Johnny Richter	3:22	
11	Pimp Twist		4:38	Royal Highness (hidden track)

(*) indicates original Kottonmouth Kings' demo

== Personnel ==
- Daddy X – Vocals, Lyrics
- D-Loc – Vocals, Lyrics
- Johnny Richter – Vocals, Lyrics
- Lou Dogg – Drums, Percussion
- DJ Bobby B – DJ, Turntables, Engineer, Programmer
- Saint Dog – Vocals, Lyrics
