= White Trash Renegade =

Studio album by Big B
- Released: April 19, 2005
- Recorded: 2004
- Genre: Hip hop
- Length: 51:49
- Label: Suburban Noize Records
- Producer: Kevin Zinger (exec.); Daddy X (exec.); Mike Kumagai

Big B chronology
High Class White Trash (2004)	White Trash Renegade (2005)	Random Stuff (2006)

Professional ratings
Review scores
Source	Rating
AllMusic	2.5/5 stars

White Trash Renegade is the second solo studio album by American rapper Big B. It was released on April 19, 2005, via Suburban Noize Records.

== CD track listing ==
#	Title	Guest artist	Time
1	New Number (Intro)		0:17
2	Keep Goin'		2:49
3	White Trash Renegade		3:33
4	Blow My Mind		3:50
5	The Underground	Daddy X	3:19
6	Some People		3:15
7	New Beginnings (Skit)	Chucky Styles & Joe Crimo	1:22
8	Crazy		3:34
9	Remember	D-Loc	3:10
10	The Drugs		3:42
11	Whiteboys		3:45
12	Collered Shirt (Skit)	Chucky Styles	0:44
13	Hit That	Johnny Richter	3:34
14	Outlaw	The Dirtball	3:43
15	Rockstar		3:26
16	Shut the Fuck Up		4:23
