= SRH Presents: Supporting Radical Habits =

Compilation album
- Released: October 25, 2005
- Recorded: 2005
- Genres: Rap; Hip hop Alternative rock
- Label: Suburban Noize Records
- Producers: Brad "Daddy X"; Mike Kumagai; Patrick "P-Nice" Shevelin

SRH Presents: Supporting Radical Habits is the fifth official compilation album by Suburban Noize Records released on October 25, 2005. This album is a CD/DVD set that includes popular names of the label, such as the Kottonmouth Kings, Judge D, and Big B along with others. The DVD features footage of Kottonmouth Kings and the Subnoize family in Japan, motocross riders Manley and Morrison(Scummy) speaking on their thoughts, motocross riders Grant Teal and Jeremy Lusk, plus more of the SRH team. It also features new Music videos by; Kottonmouth Kings, Big B, OPM, and Slightly Stoopid.

== Track listing ==
1. "SRH" (Kottonmouth Kings)
2. "Roll Call" (Judge D Ft. Dirtball)
3. "Kill That" (SX-10)
4. "Downfall" (Insolence)
5. "Things I Do (Part 2)" (Johnny Richter)
6. "Leeches" (Last Laugh)
7. "This Joint" (Slightly Stoopid)
8. "Keep A Look Out" (Subnoize Souljaz)
9. "Destroy" (Humble Gods)
10. "7 Weeks" (Pepper)
11. "Local Dub" (Too Rude)
12. "Peaceful Day" (Daddy X)
13. "Industry Beez" (Dirtball)
14. "If This Were" (DJ Bobby B Presents One Session)
15. "Seedless" (Mower)
16. "What What" (Reyes Bros)
17. "7 Conflict" (OPM)
18. "One Tree" (Mishka)
19. "Turnin' Around" (Phunk Junkeez)
20. "Backlash" (Saint Dog)
21. "The B" (Big B)
22. "Spaded, Jaded, Faded" (Kingspade)

=== Japanese version ===
1. "SRH" (Kottonmouth Kings)
2. "Roll Call" (Judge D Ft. Dirtball)
3. "Industry Beez" (Dirtball)
4. "Keep A Look Out" (Subnoize Souljaz)
5. "White Trash Renegade" (Big B)
6. "Backlash" (Saint Dog)
7. "Sicko" (Sen Dog)
8. "Things I Do (Part 2)" (Johnny Richter)
9. "Seedless" (Mowar)
10. "Kill That" (SX-10)
11. "Downfall" (Insolence)
12. "Leeches" (Last Laugh)
13. "Destroy" (Humble Gods)
14. "Turnin' Around" (Phunk Junkeez)
15. "This Joint" (Slightly Stoopid)
16. "Losing Streak" (Judge D Ft. Daddy X)
17. "7 Weeks" (Pepper)
18. "One Tree" (Mishka)
19. "The B" (Big B)
20. "Local Dub" (Too Rude)
21. "If This Were" (DJ Bobby B Presents One Session)
22. "Spaded, Jaded, Faded" (Kingspade)
