= Lost & Found (soundtrack) =

Soundtrack album by Various Artists
- Released: May 4, 1999
- Recorded: 1998–1999
- Genre: Alternative rock, dance-pop, rock, hip hop, R&B
- Label: Capitol

Professional ratings
Review scores
Source	Rating
Allmusic	2/5 stars

Lost & Found is a rock compilation album for the American film directed by Jeff Pollack, Lost & Found, released by Capitol Records on May 4, 1999. The album consists of such popular names as Zebrahead, Earth, Wind and Fire and the Kottonmouth Kings among others.

== Track listing ==
#	Title	Featured Artist	Time
1	Dog's Life Ft. Dog Boy	Kottonmouth Kings	4:27
2	Jag Off	Zebrahead	3:23
3	September	Earth, Wind & Fire	3:36
4	John Hughes 2000	Menthol	3:42
5	She's The One	World Party	4:50
6	King of the Road	Roger Miller	2:27
7	That's Amore	Dean Martin	3:08
8	Banana Bay	Luis Villegas	3:16
9	December, 1963 (Oh, What A Night)	Frankie Valli	3:33
10	Groove Is In The Heart	Deee Lite	3:54
11	Brother Love's Traveling Salvation Show	David Spade	2:30
