= More to Hate =

Studio album by Big B
- Released: August 28, 2007
- Recorded: 2006–2007
- Genre: Hip hop
- Length: 1:08:06
- Label: Suburban Noize Records
- Producers: Kevin Zinger (exec.); Daddy X (also exec.); Big B

Big B chronology
Random Stuff (2006)	More to Hate (2007)	American Underdog (2009)

Professional ratings
Review scores
Source	Rating
RapReviews	6/10

More to Hate is the third studio album by American rapper Big B. It was released on August 28, 2007 via Suburban Noize Records. The album features guest appearances from Kottonmouth Kings, Blaze Ya Dead Homie, Danny Diablo, Sen Dog and Tech N9NE. Its lead single, "White Trash Life", debuted on Sirius Radio on July 13, 2007.

== Track listing ==
#	Title	Guest artist	Time
1	More to Hate		2:55
2	American Dream		3:30
3	White Trash Life		2:56
4	Put 'Em Up	Danny Diablo	2:58
5	Counting Pennies		4:11
6	Pass the Jager	The Dirtball	2:56
7	Real As They Come		3:18
8	Looky Looky		4:00
9	Harley (Skit)		0:18
10	On the Road		4:22
11	Come Take a Journey		4:07
12	How Quick	Blaze Ya Dead Homie	3:21
13	Miss Wonderful		2:43
14	This Is Me		3:34
15	We Can Smoke	Kottonmouth Kings	3:09
16	Million Miles	Tech N9NE	3:51
17	Living on the Edge	Sen Dog	3:47
18	It's All Good	The Dirtball	3:49
19	Staring Out My Window	John E. Necro	3:24
20	Brand New Day	Daddy X	3:22
21	Suk It (Outro)		1:37

== Chart history ==
Chart (2007)	Peak position
US Independent Albums (Billboard)	42
US Heatseekers Albums (Billboard)	17
