= Suburban Noize Presents: Sub-Noize Rats =

Compilation album
- Released: September 2, 2003
- Recorded: 2003
- Genre: Rap; Hip hop Alternative rock
- Label: Suburban Noize
- Producer: Brad "Daddy X", Mike Kumagai, Patrick "P-Nice" Shevelin

chronology
SRH Presents: Spaded, Jaded, and Faded (2002)	Suburban Noize Presents: Sub-Noize Rats (2003)	The Royal Family (2004)

Suburban Noize Presents: Sub-Noize Rats is the third official compilation album by Suburban Noize Records released on September 2, 2003.

== Track listing ==
#	Title	Featured Artist
1	Adventures Of This	Kingspade
2	Born Free	Humble Gods
3	Got your Back Ft. D-Loc	Judge D
4	Good As Gold/Kingsblend/Zero Tolerance Live	Kottonmouth Kings
5	Fight	Saint Dog
6	Hooligan	Big B
7	Magnetic Mic Control	Phunk Junkeez
8	Forgive Me Father	Pakelika
9	Watchin Time Fly Ft. Daddy X and Judge D	Tsunami Brothers
10	Define Destiny	Last Laugh
11	Long Awaited Riot	Mower
12	Irie Feeling	Daddy X
