= Music for Misfits =

Compilation album by Big B
- Released: June 21, 2011
- Genre: Hip hop
- Length: 1:00:36
- Label: Suburban Noize Records
- Producers: Kevin Zinger (exec.); Daddy X (exec.); Big B; Jim Perkins; Mellow Man Ace; Scott Russo

Big B chronology
Good Times & Bad Advice (2010)	Music for Misfits (2011)	Fool's Gold (2013)

Professional ratings
Review scores
Source	Rating
AllMusic	3.5/5 stars

Music for Misfits is a compilation album by American rapper Big B. It was released on June 21, 2011 via Suburban Noize Records. All songs were previously released on earlier works except "Last One" and "Bad Girl", which were later released on 2013's Fool's Gold.

== Track listing ==
1. "Bad Girl" - 3:39
2. "Friends or Foes" (featuring Karlos Paez of B-Side Players) - 3:47
3. "Last One" - 3:16
4. "For Tonight" (featuring Scott Russo) - 3:39
5. "Sinner" (featuring Scott Russo) - 3:30
6. "Good Times" - 3:15
7. "Before I Leave This Place" (featuring Everlast) - 4:17
8. "Hooligan" - 3:19
9. "Out Here in Cali" - 3:26
10. "White Trash Renegade" - 3:33
11. "White Trash Life" - 2:56
12. "Criminal" - 3:47
13. "American Dream" - 3:30
14. "Somebody" - 3:36
15. "A Million Miles" (featuring Tech N9NE) - 3:50
16. "Let's Go Play" - 3:40
17. "Rockstar" - 3:26
