= Good Times & Bad Advice =

Studio album by Big B
- Released: September 14, 2010
- Genre: Hip hop
- Length: 52:29
- Label: Suburban Noize Records
- Producer: Kevin Zinger (exec.); Daddy X (exec.); Big B; Cisco Adler; Jim Perkins; Scott Russo

Big B chronology
American Underdog (2009)	Good Times & Bad Advice (2010)	Music for Misfits (2011)

Professional ratings
Review scores
Source	Rating
AllMusic	3.5/5 stars
RapReviews	7/10

Good Times & Bad Advice is the fifth studio album by American rapper Big B. It was released on September 14, 2010 via Suburban Noize Records. The album features guest appearances from Everlast, Scott Russo, Glasses Malone, Jim Perkins, Cisco Adler, Jamie Allensworth and Kaleo.

== Track listing ==
1. "Yesterday" - 3:09
2. "Before I Leave This Place" (featuring Everlast) - 4:16
3. "For Tonight" (featuring Scott Russo) - 3:40
4. "I Fucked Up Again" - 3:25
5. "Good Times" - 3:16
6. "Live Your Life" (featuring Glasses Malone & Jim Perkins) - 3:42
7. "This Is For" - 3:29
8. "My Baby Says" (featuring Cisco Adler) - 3:30
9. "Travelin' Man" (featuring Jamie Allensworth) - 3:23
10. "Music Saved My Life" (featuring Kaleo) - 3:39
11. "Highs And Lows" - 3:32
12. "Just Me and You" - 3:27
13. "Out Here in Cali" - 3:26
14. "Turn Up the Radio" - 3:31
15. "They Say” - 3:03

== Chart history ==
Chart (2010)	Peak position
US Top Rap Albums (Billboard)	22
US Heatseekers Albums (Billboard)	13
