= Legalize It (EP) =

Legalize It EP

EP by Kottonmouth Kings
- Released: April 19, 2011
- Recorded: 2010–2011
- Label: Suburban Noize Records
- Producer: Brad Daddy X

Kottonmouth Kings chronology
Long Live The Kings (2010)	Legalize It EP (2011)	Sunrise Sessions (2011)

Legalize It is the fifth EP released by the hip hop band Kottonmouth Kings. The EP was scheduled for a digital release on April 20, 2011 (4-20), but it was released a day early on April 19.

== Track listing ==
Legalize It track listing
No.	Title	Length
1.	"Stonetown"	4:45
2.	"My Garden"	5:03
3.	"Rise Above"	4:11
4.	"Soon Come"	5:04
5.	"Ganja Daze"	4:58
6.	"Defy Gravity"	4:55
