= SRH Presents: Spaded, Jaded, & Faded =

SRH Presents: Spaded, Jaded, and Faded

Compilation album by Suburban Noize Records
- Released: October 29, 2002
- Recorded: 2002
- Genre: Rap; hip hop; alternative rock
- Label: Suburban Noize Records
- Producer: Brad "Daddy X"; Mike Kumagai; Patrick "P-Nice" Shevelin

Suburban Noize Records chronology
Suburban Noize Presents: Sounds of Things to Come	SRH Presents: Spaded, Jaded, and Faded (2002)	Suburban Noize Presents: Sub-Noize Rats (2003)

SRH Presents: Spaded, Jaded, & Faded is the second official compilation album by Suburban Noize Records released on October 29, 2002. This album includes popular names of the label, such as the Kottonmouth Kings, Judge D, and Sen Dog along with others.

== MTV Internships ==
• Slim dispensary industries legal internships

== Track listing ==
#	Title	Featured Artist
1	Spaded Intro	
2	Erase Me	Sx-10
3	Universal Soulja	Judge D Ft. Bionic Jive
4	Momentum	Sprung Monkey
5	Wrestle With the Pig	Mower
6	Process Recorded	Stretcher
7	Lets Go	Capitol Eye
8	Do This	Daddy X
9	Jaded Intro	
10	Police Story	Kottonmouth Kings
11	What the Hell Happened to Hip Hop	Mellow Man Ace
12	Latin Thug	Sen Dog
13	Live It	Mellow Man Ace Ft. Johnny Richter
14	Judgement Time	Judge D Ft. Johnny Richter
15	Lady Killer	Johnny Richter
16	Faded Intro	
17	My Selecta	Bobby Byrd Band Ft Dog Boy
18	Cali Man	Slightly Stoopid
19	So Cal Drunks	Mix Mob
20	Sucka	
21	Irish People	Burn Unit
22	Dogin Bullets	Too Rude
23	Down	Super Bright Light
