= Too Rude (album) =

Studio album by Too Rude
- Released: April 4, 2000
- Genre: Reggae; Reggae Rock; Punk rock Dub
- Label: Suburban Noize Records

Too Rude chronology
| Too Rude (2000) | Re-Invention (2004) |

Too Rude is the debut album for the reggae punk band, Too Rude. It is also the first album the vocalist Dogboy recorded. The album was released April 4, 2000, on Suburban Noize Records. It was recorded as a traditional reggae record with a punky twist.

== Track listing ==
| # | Title | Time |
|---|---|---|
| 1 | Do You Feel What I Mean | 4:20 |
| 2 | New Sheriff | 3:39 |
| 3 | Burn Kali | 4:44 |
| 4 | Not Today | 3:50 |
| 5 | Too Rude For My Own Good | 3:14 |
| 6 | Gunshot | 3:52 |
| 7 | Meet You There | 4:43 |
| 8 | Drop By | 3:54 |
| 9 | Tribal War | 4:54 |
| 10 | If You Love It | 4:12 |
| 11 | Got Nothin' | 4:13 |
| 12 | On Our Way | 3:20 |
| 13 | Connected | 3:46 |
| 14 | Dog History | 4:49 |
| 15 | Do You Feel What I Dub | 4:24 |
