= Out of the Darkness, Into the Light =

Compilation album by Various Artists
- Released: June 16, 1998
- Recorded: 1998
- Genre: Rapcore; Ska; Punk rock Alternative rock
- Label: Dolomite
- Producer: Patrick Green

Various Artists chronology
N/A	Out of the Darkness, Into the Light	N/A

Out of the Darkness, Into the Light is a compilation album by Dolomite released on June 16, 1998. This album includes popular names such as the Kottonmouth Kings and The Untouchables along with many others.

== Track listing ==
#	Title	Featured Artist
1	Criminal Mind	World Tribe
2	Stomping To That Wondersound	Weapon of Choice
3	Bump	Kottonmouth Kings
4	When I Grow Up	Gran Torino
5	Tropical Bird	The Untouchables
6	Crank It up	Headboard
7	Just Another Day At Work	Chris Gentry
8	Soul Magic	Soul Machine
9	Cryptonite	Afrodiziak
10	Real Metaphor	Funktion
11	I Love Hypocrites	Vitamin L
12	Mi Vida Loca (DJ Shawny B Remix)	Bonafide
13	Turning Out	Pocket Lent
14	Geet Yo Boogie On	Rifleman
15	We Just Wanna Party	Da Pimps
16	Nation Ball	De Crunchchaes, Cheze
17	Sirius Time	West Coast Harem
18	Bad Road	Infaredeye
