= High Class White Trash =

Studio album by Big B
- Released: January 20, 2004
- Recorded: 2003
- Genre: Hip hop
- Length: 56:34
- Label: Suburban Noize Records
- Producer: Kevin Zinger (exec.); Big B; Bronek Wroblewski; DJ Ace; Geoff "Casper" Turney; John E. Necro; Mellow Man Ace; TJ Lavin

Big B chronology
High Class White Trash (2004)	White Trash Renegade (2005)

High Class White Trash is the debut solo studio album by American rapper Big B. It was released on January 20, 2004, via Suburban Noize Records.

== CD track listing ==
#	Title	Guest artist	Time
1	Big B Duz It		4:01
2	Real		3:46
3	B'Rock (Interlude)		0:47
4	Raise It Up		3:13
5	Holligan		3:20
6	Marco (Interlude)		1:03
7	Half Empty	Daddy X & D-Loc	2:59
8	Tweakers		3:42
9	Scummy (Interlude)		0:37
10	Fuck or Fight	Johnny Richter	3:17
11	Addicted		2:19
12	TJ (Interlude)		0:45
13	Summertime		3:38
14	A&R	John E. Necro	3:48
15	MNO (Interlude)		0:27
16	Your Friends		3:04
17	Controversy		3:45
18	Battle		4:29
19	Outro		7:35
