= Rebel Riddim =

Studio album by Dog Boy
- Released: April 3, 2007
- Recorded: 2006–2007
- Genre: Reggae; Reggae rock Ska; Rocksteady; Punk rock Dub
- Label: Suburban Noize Records
- Producer: Dog Boy; Mike Kumagai; Patrick "P-Nice" Shevelin

Rebel Riddim is the official debut album from Dog Boy, released on April 3, 2007 with Suburban Noize Records. This album was most notable for its mixture of a variety of styles used worldwide including the odd mix of reggae and punk rock. As of May 12, 2007 Rebel Riddim reached #11 on the Billboard's Top Reggae Albums chart.

== Track listing ==
#	Title	Time
1	Return of the One Drop	2:55
2	She's Driving	2:43
3	Rebel Riddim	2:42
4	Can't Buy Soul	2:28
5	Dear Jamaica (Stand Strong)	3:19
6	Where to Now?	2:56
7	Hold You	3:10
8	Fearless with a Smile	3:19
9	Daddy What Is War?	2:43
10	Falling	2:42
11	One Stop Shopping	3:28
12	Desperate Times	3:08
13	Locked and Loaded	2:49
14	Sexy Rebel	2:44
15	You're My Reward	3:11
16	Straight Love Thing	3:38
17	Tap Into/Dub Into	5:27
