= Big Air Experience =

Compilation album by Various artists
- Released: March 25, 2003
- Genres: Rapcore; Gangsta rap Alternative rock Rap
- Label: Priority
- Producers: Mark Copeland; Greg Danylyshyn; Bryan Kelley; Shannon Ward

Professional ratings
Review scores
Source	Rating
Allmusic	2.5/5 stars

Big Air Experience is a compilation album mixed with gangsta rap and alternative rock music released by Priority on March 25, 2003. The album consists of such popular names as Snoop Dogg, N.W.A. and Saliva among others.

== Track listing ==
#	Title	Featured Artist(s)	Time
1	Proven	Hatebreed	2:35
2	War Zone	Slayer	2:44
3	First It Giveth	Queens of the Stone Age	3:18
4	Kiss the Skull	Danzig	4:10
5	So I Quit	Filter	3:19
6	Raise Up	Saliva	3:45
7	Rock Star	N*E*R*D	4:20
8	Wicked	Ice Cube	3:55
9	Appetite for Destruction	N.W.A.	3:07
10	Tweaked	Hotwire	2:18
11	5 Seconds	Shortie	3:02
12	Gravity	Audiovent	3:37
13	Thoughts Without Words	Shadows Fall	4:31
14	As Real as It Gets	Sworn Enemy	3:01
15	Full Throttle	Kottonmouth Kings	4:08
16	Lay Low	Snoop Dogg, Master P and Nate Dogg	4:02
17	The Gangsta, the Killa, and the Dope Dealer	Westside Connection	3:23
18	On the Block (Golden Era)	R.A. the Rugged Man and Human Beatbox Bub	4:11
