= Soul Machine (musician) =

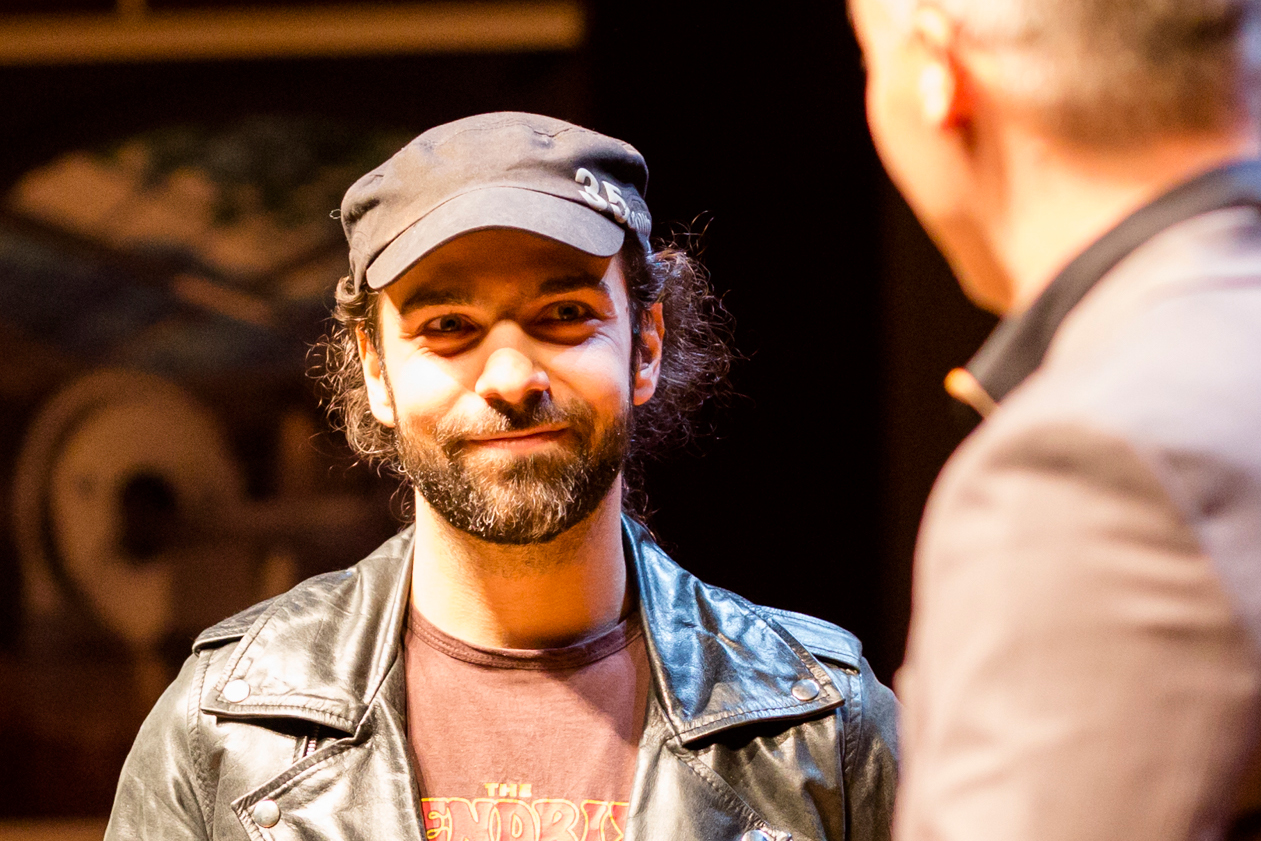
- Soul Machine in 2015

Background information
- Origin: France
- Genres: Electronic music; Electronic rock; Electronica; nu-disco; French house
- Years active: 2009–present
- Labels: So French Records; Icon Records; Else Music; Jet Set Trash
- Website: Official Page

Jérémie Palmigiani, better known by his stage name Soul Machine, is a French electronic music producer and an electronic instrument designer. He has worked as a solo electronic musician and as a remixer for artists such as Yann Destal (Modjo), Nyls or Missill.

== Music ==
He started DJing and producing music under the name of Soul Machine in 2009. The French radio Radio Metal invited him to their "High Hopes" show of December 2010 after he released a non-official remix of the song "Blackened" by Metallica.

In 2012, the French DJ Girl Missill asks him to produce some tracks for her upcoming album and a remix of her single "Champions" in collaboration with the American hip hop duo M.O.P. and the British MC Dynamite MC. The same year, he records a tribute to the French duo Justice on the massive pipe organ of Saint Joseph's Basilica in Grenoble, France.

He composes in 2013 the soundtrack of a documentary directed in Fukushima by the charity/fashion project "Silk Me Back in Japan".

In parallel, the Franco-Italian singer Nyls, asks him to remix his single "Crazy". The remix is featured in the Soundtrack of the movie "Yellow" directed by Rene Zhang the following year.

In 2014, Yann Destal, singer of Modjo, calls him to remix his single "Walk With Me". Soul Machine releases the same year a double EP Phanerosphene I&II on So French Records, with an art cover painted by the Arizonian Psychedelic artist Jeff Hopp. The Artwork will later be featured in the painter's Comic book "Legend of the Mind - A Philip K. Dick Tribute".

He releases in 2015 the song "Wonderkids" co-produced with the Czech producer Atrey. The EP "Wonderkids Remixes" is released the following year featuring remixers such as Superfunk or Mozambo. Soul Machine releases in 2020 the song "Wicked Desire" featuring the american singer Krissy Abshire and remixes from Atrey, Bastion and Kn1ghT.

In 2024, Soul Machine composed the soundtrack for UCHRONIKA, an exhibition by visual artist Cyril Auklair.

== Instruments design ==
In 2018, Soul Machine introduces his own handmade Electronic instruments under the name of "Far Beyond Perception".

The MS-X, an Analog synthesizer, is a modified Korg Monotron inspired by the Korg MS-10.

The Psylotron is a hybrid replica of the Mellotron M400.

== Retro Visions ==
Since 2020, Soul Machine pays tribute to pop culture through video covers of theme songs from 80s and 90s television series and animated shows, under the title Retro Visions.

In 2021, his Retro Vision of Jayce and the Wheeled Warriors becomes the introduction theme of the Protean Ramblings retro Podcast.

In 2022, the Retro Vision version of Ulysses 31 was selected as the theme music for the radio show Destination Séries on Radio Fajet.

In May 2025, his work is featured by French youtuber Joueur du Grenier during a live stream on Twitch.

== Discography ==
Singles:

Year	Title	Label
2012	O.C.S.I.D	So French Records
2012	Prohibition	So French Records
2012	Haunted	EN Records
2013	Off the Lip (Zano Boogie)	So French Records
2014	Chromaesthesia	So French Records
2015	Wonderkids (feat Atrey)	So French Records
2016	New Horizons over Pluto	So French Records
2021	Haunted 2020	Soul Machine
2021	Mellochrome	Soul Machine
2021	The Bends of Time (feat Orbis)	Soul Machine
2022	Tokyo Chase (feat Kn1ghT)	Soul Machine
2022	Back in Time (feat Run Kennedy and Aoife O'Leary)	Soul Machine
2022	Exoniverse IV	Soul Machine
2022	Moonlight Sonata	Soul Machine
2022	Let the Moon Be Your Guide (feat. Run Kennedy & Pure Obsessions & Red Nights)	Soul Machine
2022	Love Like Knives (with Pure Obsessions & Red Nights)	Soul Machine
2022	Distant Signal	Soul Machine
2023	Rapture of the Deep	Run Kennedy
2024	Milky Waves	Soul Machine
2024	Shõnen Avengers (ft. Zed le Rouge)	ZeMial
2025	Helivelo	Soul Machine
2025	Hypnocracy	Soul Machine
2026	La Scapparella	Soul Machine

EPs:

Year	Title	Label
2014	Phanerosphene : Part I	So French Records
2014	Phanerosphene : Part II	So French Records
2015	Wonderkids Remixes	So French Records
2020	Wicked Desire	Soul Machine
2022	Passive Attack	Soul Machine

Official Remixes:

Year	Artist	Title	Label
2012	Missill feat M.O.P. & Dynamite MC	Champions (Soul Machine Remix)	Play Me Records
2013	AdriAn	Deluded State (Soul Machine Remix)	So French Records
2013	Rubber Spanner	Satanic Synths from Outer Space (Soul Machine Remix)	Jet Set Trash
2013	Nyls	Crazy (Soul Machine Remix)	Icon Records
2013	Dizkodeath	Wizard (Soul Machine Remix)	Jet Set Trash
2014	Yann Destal	Walk With Me (Soul Machine Remix)	Else Music
2021	Kn1ghT	To the Moon (Soul Machine Remix)	Kn1ghT

Unofficial Covers & Remixes:

Year	Title	Type
2010	Metallica - Blackened	Remix
2010	Black Rebel Motorcycle Club - Whatever Happened to my Rock'n Roll	Remix
2011	Jean-Michel Jarre - Oxygene II	Remix
2011	Mylène Farmer - Avant que l'Ombre	Remix
2012	Justice - Horsepower	Remix
2013	Matthieu Chedid - Machistador	Remix
2013	Pink Floyd - On the Run	Remix
2013	Daft Punk - Giorgio by Moroder	Remix
2013	Justice - Pipe Organ Meddley	Cover
2014	Pink Floyd - One of these Days	Remix
2019	Daft Punk - Veridis Quo	Remix
2021	Archive - F*ck U	Remix
2021	Jayce and the Wheeled Warriors	Retro Vision
2021	Ulysse 31 - Ulysse Revient	Retro Vision
2022	Kavinsky - Pulsar	Cover
2022	Les Mondes Engloutis	Retro Vision
2022	Vangelis - Monastery of la Rabida	Cover
2022	Vangelis - La Petite Fille de la Mer	Cover
2022	Teenage Mutant Ninja Turtles	Retro Vision
2022	Muse - Citizen Erased (ft. Orbis)	Cover
2023	K 2000 - Knight Rider Theme	Retro Vision
2023	Les Mystérieuses Cités d'Or	Retro Vision
2023	The Cramps - Human Fly (ft. Krissy Abshire)	Cover
2023	Radiohead - Exit Music (for a Film) ft. Orbis	Cover
2024	Dragon Ball Z - Sayonara Senshi-Tachi	Retro Vision
2024	Inspecteur Gadget	Retro Vision
2025	Darkthrone - Transylvanian Hunger	Cover
2025	Albator - Battle Theme (ft. NR Synth)	Retro Vision
2026	Gesaffelstein - Aleph	Cover
2026	Air - Playground Love	Cover
2026	Air - Suicide Underground	Cover
