= Nyls =

French composer and singer (born 1982)

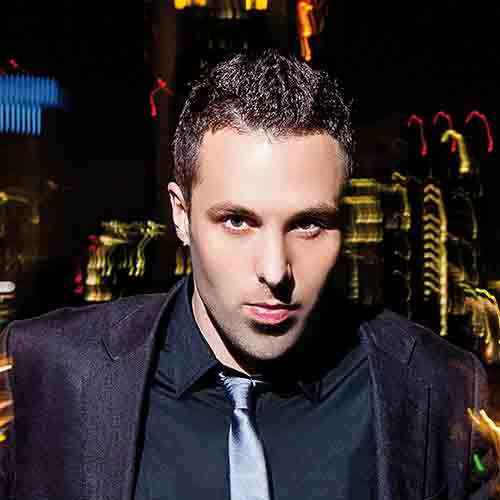
- Nyls
- Born: September 23, 1982 (age 43)
- Occupation: Singer
- Years active: 2007–present
- Label: Icon Records France Atlantika Music Pulse Records
- Website: https://www.nylsofficial.com/

Nyls (born September 23, 1982) is a French singer and composer of Italian origin. Nyls is a pseudonym; his real name is unknown.

== Life and career ==
Nyls grew up in Grenoble, France and in Lama dei Peligni, Italy.

His musical career began in 2007 when he teamed up with the Italian pop duet Paola e Chiara, for which he wrote the single "Seconde Chance" in French, taken from their album "Win The Game". The single reached position 4 in the Italian charts.

In 2008, he met Frederic Messel, CEO of Icon Records France. This meeting led to the production and release of his debut album "Kairos", published in 2012. Four singles "Avance" (4th), "Ce Que Tu N'es Pas" (7th), "A Califourchon "(6th)," Comme Une Trace "(8th) taken from this album will make it into the French iTunes Top 10. The art direction was entrusted to Marco Contini, who collaborated with artists such as Irene Grandi and Marco Carta in the past. The album also gets a Japanese release.

Later, Nyls released an English single, "It's Gonna Be Alright", which only achieved moderate success. The single was pulled from his second album, "Nightlife".

"Crazy" was chosen as the second single. The song peaked at position 8 on the French iTunes Single charts.

In December 2013, Nyls was asked to create and record the main theme for the movie "Dragon Nest". The song is titled " Keep The Dragon Alive". In 2015, his album Pulse was released.
