= Heaven Is a Halfpipe =

2000 single by OPM

Single by OPM

from the album Menace to Sobriety
- B-side: "Space People"; "Group Therapy"
- Released: June 27, 2000
- Genre: Reggae; skate punk; rap rock
- Length: 4:18
- Label: Atlantic
- Songwriters: Matthew Meschery; Geoff Turney; John Edney; Roy C. Hammond
- Producers: Josh Deutsch; Craig Kallman

OPM singles chronology
"Heaven Is a Halfpipe" (2000)	"El Capitan" (2001)

Music video
- "Heaven Is a Halfpipe" on YouTube

"Heaven Is a Halfpipe" (also known as "Heaven Is a Halfpipe (If I Die)") is a song by American rock band OPM. It was included on their debut studio album, Menace to Sobriety (2000), and was released on June 27, 2000, as its lead single.

The song peaked at number 18 on the US Billboard Modern Rock Tracks chart and was a top-40 hit in several other nations, including the United Kingdom, where it reached number four on the UK Singles Chart. It was the 33rd-best-selling single of 2001 in the UK, earning a gold certification from the British Phonographic Industry (BPI) for sales and streams of over 400,000. The song was re-recorded in 2012 for the Heaven Can Wait EP.

== Content ==
"Heaven Is a Halfpipe" is about a man who loves skateboarding, getting high and being free. He imagines Heaven being like a half-pipe, where he does not have to worry about the police ruining his good time ("'Cause right now on Earth I can't do jack / without the man upon my back"). The trick skills of professional skateboarders Christian Hosoi and Mike McGill are mentioned during the bridge ("Like Christian Hosoi way back in '87" / "We'll be busting Christ airs until we get to heaven" / "With all your rules, you gots to chill" / "I'm gonna twist out like Mike McGill" / "I'm gonna twist out cos I got the skills").

== Music video ==
The music video features OPM doing skateboarding tricks on a large half-pipe and flying around. At the end of the video, they perform to a crowd. One man in the audience also wears a white T-shirt that says "FREE CHRISTIAN HOSOI", in reference to Hosoi's arrest in January 2000 for attempting to transport nearly 1.5 lb of crystal methamphetamine from Los Angeles to Honolulu.

== Track listings ==
UK CD and cassette single; Australian CD single

1. "Heaven Is a Halfpipe" (album version) – 4:18
2. "Space People" – 3:45
3. "Group Therapy" – 2:21

German CD single

1. "Heaven Is a Halfpipe" (clean album version) – 4:18
2. "Space People" – 3:45

== Charts ==
=== Weekly charts ===
Chart (2000–2001)	Peak position
Australia (ARIA)	59
Austria (Ö3 Austria Top 40)	5
Europe (Eurochart Hot 100)	16
Germany (GfK)	20
Ireland (IRMA)	9
Netherlands (Single Top 100)	87
New Zealand (Recorded Music NZ)	30
Scottish Singles Sales (Official Charts)	3
Sweden (Sverigetopplistan)	19
Switzerland (Schweizer Hitparade)	37
UK Singles (Official Charts)	4
US Modern Rock Tracks (Billboard)	18

=== Year-end charts ===
Chart (2000)	Position
US Modern Rock Tracks (Billboard)	99

Chart (2001)	Position
Austria (Ö3 Austria Top 40)	52
Germany (Media Control)	100
Ireland (IRMA)	47
UK Singles (OCC)	33

== Certifications ==
Region	Certification	Certified units/sales
United Kingdom (BPI)	Gold	400,000^{‡}
^{‡} Sales+streaming figures based on certification alone.

== Release history ==
Region	Date	Format(s)	Label(s)	Ref.
United States	June 27, 2000	Alternative radio	Atlantic	
Australia	October 2000	CD	Atlantic	
United Kingdom	July 2, 2001	CD; cassette	Atlantic	
