= The Real Cancun (soundtrack) =

Soundtrack album by Various artists
- Released: May 13, 2003
- Genre: Rapcore; Alternative rock Rap
- Length: 46:58
- Label: Thrive
- Producer: Howard Benson; Crazy Town; Mitch Rotter; Ricardo Vinas

Professional ratings
Review scores
Source	Rating
Allmusic	2/5 stars

The Real Cancun is an original soundtrack for 2003 American reality film The Real Cancun, released by Thrive on May 13, 2003. The album consists of such popular names as Simple Plan, Trick Daddy and the Kottonmouth Kings among others.

== Track listing ==
#	Title	Featured Artist(s)	Time
1	Intro		0:51
2	1st Time	Bad Ronald	3:34
3	Fever for the Flava	Hot Action Cop	4:09
4	You're So Damn Hot	OK Go	2:36
5	Positive Vibes	Kottonmouth Kings	3:43
6	Take It to da House	Trick Daddy	3:46
7	Better Than Sex		0:21
8	It Takes Two	Rob Base and DJ E-Z Rock	4:44
9	Jellyfish		0:20
10	Hurt You So Bad (Remixed by Paul Oakenfold)	Crazy Town	4:11
11	The Ketchup Song	Las Ketchup	3:32
12	Over Seasons	Authority Zero	3:18
13	Farther	Outspoken	3:55
14	All You Can Ever Learn Is What You Already Know	The Ataris	3:33
15	Grow Up [live]	Simple Plan	2:58
16	Back in the 80s	Dave Ingber	1:29
