= ForThemAsses =

Studio album by OPM
- Released: June 22, 2004
- Length: 53:22
- Label: Suburban Noize
- Producer: OPM, Steve Gallagher

OPM chronology
| Menace to Sobriety (2000) | ForThemAsses (2004) | California Poppy (2006) |

ForThemAsses is the second album by California band OPM, released on June 22, 2004. The album features Johnny Richter, Eek-A-Mouse and Yellowman. It produced one single "Horny" released in 2005. The 2005 release of the album features a front cover similar to the Outlaws, Perverts and Misfits EP as well as featuring 3 bonus tracks; "Down Under", "Conflict" and "Horny" featuring TJ Lavin.

== Track listing ==
1. "Intro" – 0:34
2. "Bump" - 3:38
3. "Rollin" - 3:49
4. "Luffly" - 3:15
5. "Interlude: Dave Grohl" - 0:11
6. "Kali Kings" (featuring Johnny Richter) - 4:42
7. "Every Day" - 4:10
8. "Perfect Day" (featuring Eek-A-Mouse) - 4:07
9. "Interlude: Doggy Style" - 0:12
10. "Horny" - 3:33
11. "How It Soundz" - 3:30
12. "I Don't O U" - 3:38
13. "Necropolis" (featuring Yellowman) - 5:07
14. "Interlude: You Have a Collect Call" - 0:24
15. "Pot Luck" - 2:32
16. "Viva" - 10:00

== 2005 Bonus Tracks ==
1. "Down Under" - 3:57
2. "Conflict" - 4:09
3. "Horny" (featuring TJ Lavin) - 3:54

== Videos ==
- "Horny"
- "Rollin"
- "Luffly"

== Band Line-up ==
- John E. Necro - lead vocals, rapping, piano
- Big B - rapping, vocals
- Geoff Turney aka Casper - guitar, bass
- Jonathan Williams - organ, keyboards
- Michael Beinhorn - percussion
- Etienne Franc - bass on "Conflict"
- Gary Dean - drums on "Conflict"

== Lyrics ==
The lyrics for every song on the album can be found in PDF form at the official OPM website under Music, or by clicking here (direct link to .pdf file).
