= SRH Presents: Lose Your Illusions, Vol. 1 =

SRH Presents Lose Your Illusions, Vol. 1

Compilation album by Various artists
- Released: October 6, 1998
- Recorded: 1998
- Genre: Rapcore; ska; punk rock; alternative rock
- Length: 54:15
- Label: Interscope
- Producer: Kevin Zinger; Ryan White; Al Guerra

Various artists chronology
SRH Presents; Lose Your Illusions, Vol. 1	Suburban Noize Presents: Sounds of Things to Come

SRH Presents: Lose Your Illusions, Vol. 1 is the first (non official) compilation album by Suburban Noize Records released under Interscope Records on October 6, 1998. This album includes popular names under Interscope, such as the Kottonmouth Kings, Limp Bizkit, and Pennywise along with many others.

== Track listing ==
#	Title	Featured artist	Length
1	Coffin Text	Unwritten Law	2:58
2	Roll It Up	Kottonmouth Kings	4:06
3	Priscilla	Sprung Monkey	2:33
4	Shapely	Lucy's Fur Coat	4:07
5	Elders	The Offspring	2:11
6	Break It Up	Rocket From The Crypt	3:24
7	Fight Till You Die	Pennywise	2:23
8	Shut Up	Upbeat	1:31
9	Sucka MC	Source	3:08
10	The Poor Me Sob Story	Furious Four	3:14
11	Bakers Dozen	Guttermouth	2:09
12	Spies for Life	Youth Brigade	2:58
13	Sour	Limp Bizkit	3:33
14	Forget the World	The Hippos	2:51
15	The Secret	Hepcat	3:07
16	B.M.T.P.	Slightly Stoopid	3:11
17	Split	Buck-O-Nine	2:58
18	White Lightning	Wank	3:54
