= Long Live the Kings =

Studio album by Kottonmouth Kings
- Released: April 20, 2010
- Studio: The Cannibus Cabin (Tehachapi, CA); The Subnoize Compound (Los Angeles, CA); Electric Ghetto (Los Angeles, CA); Spidey Hole Studios (Bend, OR)
- Genre: Rap rock
- Length: 1:16:06
- Label: Suburban Noize Records
- Producer: Daddy X; Mike Kumagai; Jim Perkins

Kottonmouth Kings chronology
The Green Album (2008)	Long Live the Kings (2010)	Sunrise Sessions (2011)

Professional ratings
Review scores
Source	Rating
AllMusic	3.5/5 stars
Consequence of Sound	F
RapReviews	6/10

Long Live the Kings is the tenth studio album by American hip-hop group Kottonmouth Kings. It was released on April 20, 2010, via Suburban Noize Records. Recording sessions took place at the "Cannibus Cabin" in Tehachapi, California and at the Subnoize Compound and Electric Ghetto in Los Angeles, with additional vocals recorded at Spidey Hole Studios in Bend, Oregon. Production was handled by Mike Kumagai, Jim Perkins, and member Daddy X, who also served as executive producer together with Kevin Zinger. It features guest appearances from Big B, BJ Smith, Dogboy, Insane Clown Posse, Tech N9NE, Vicky Calhoun, Jason Nava and Sonny Tipton.

This was the first album after adding The Dirtball into the group as well as the only album to date that featured eight members of the Kottonmouth Kings on the cover of the album, as it was released just prior to Pakelika leaving the group. It features the single "At It Again" from Johnny Richter's new solo studio album, Laughing, as well as a single from The Dirtball, entitled "Mushrooms", which is said to be the sequel to a song he released earlier in his career called "Mushroom Cloud".

A deluxe edition of the album including a Super Bonus CD (containing all bonus tracks that were available through other retailers' exclusives and two tracks that were only available on the Super Bonus CD) and DVD was sold exclusively through the Suburban Noize online store. The Super Bonus CD contained 16 tracks; the first 11 tracks were included on a bonus disc with the Best Buy edition of Long Live the Kings, tracks 12–14 were included as bonus tracks on the iTunes edition of the album, and tracks 15–16 were exclusive to the Super Bonus CD. The bonus CD featured guest appearances by Saint Dog and Dog Boy, as well as tracks from D-Loc, DJ Bobby B, and the X-Pistols (a newly formed side group, similar to Kingspade, consisting of KMK vocalists Daddy X and The Dirtball).

The album peaked at number 26 on the Billboard 200, number 3 on both the Top Rap Albums and the Independent Albums, number 6 on the Top Rock Albums, and number 4 on the Top Alternative Albums chart in the United States.

== Track listing ==
Long Live The Kings
No.	Title	Length
1.	"Long Live the Kings" (featuring BJ Smith)	4:46
2.	"Party Monsters" (featuring Tech N9NE)	4:18
3.	"Rampage"	3:24
4.	"Great When You're High" (featuring BJ Smith and Jason Nava)	4:01
5.	"Stomp"	3:58
6.	"Lucky Day" (featuring Sonny Tipton)	4:43
7.	"At It Again" (Johnny Richter's solo track)	2:47
8.	"Make It Rain"	3:40
9.	"Party Girls" (featuring Vicky Calhoun)	3:05
10.	"Mushrooms" (The Dirtball's solo track)	4:05
11.	"Black Smoke"	3:30
12.	"Fuck the Police" (featuring Insane Clown Posse and Sonny Tipton)	4:37
13.	"Reefer Madness"	4:28
14.	"Checkmate" (featuring BJ Smith)	4:21
15.	"Kill the Pain"	4:16
16.	"Mad Respect"	3:59
17.	"Lets Do Drugs" (featuring Big B and Sonny Tipton)	3:23
18.	"Let the Indo Blow" (featuring BJ Smith)	2:50
19.	"Take It to the Top"	3:00
20.	"Simple & Free"	3:55
Total length:		1:16:06

Deluxe Edition Surburban Noize Store Super Bonus CD
No.	Title	Artist(s)	Length
21.	"High Times"	Kottonmouth Kings	3:50
22.	"All I Need"	Kottonmouth Kings and Dogboy	3:32
23.	"It's a Lie"	Kottonmouth Kings	4:01
24.	"Talkin' Shit on the Internet"	Kottonmouth Kings	3:51
25.	"Life Is Beautiful"	Kottonmouth Kings	4:22
26.	"Smiling Faces"	Kottonmouth Kings	4:07
27.	"Enjoy The Ride"	Kottonmouth Kings	3:35
28.	"Dead and Gone"	Kottonmouth Kings	4:17
29.	"Playa"	D-Loc and Saint Dog	5:04
30.	"P in the Punk"	X-Pistols	2:32
31.	"Super Chronic Megablast"	DJ Bobby B	4:15
32.	"Free Soul"	Kottonmouth Kings	4:25
33.	"American Made"	Kottonmouth Kings	2:07
34.	"Last Joint"	Kottonmouth Kings	3:44
35.	"Mission Control"	Kottonmouth Kings	3:52
36.	"Top of the World"	Kottonmouth Kings	4:26

== Personnel ==
Kottonmouth Kings

- Brad "Daddy X" Xavier – vocals, producer, arranger, sequencer, executive producer, liner notes
- Dustin "D-Loc" Miller – vocals
- Timothy "Johnny Richter" McNutt – vocals
- David "The Dirtball" Alexander – vocals
- Luiz "Lou Dog" Gaez – performer
- Robert "DJ Bobby B" Adams – performer
- Patrick "Pakelika" Cochrun – performer

Guest musicians

- BJ Smith – vocals (tracks: 1, 4, 14, 18)
- Aaron "Tech N9NE" Yates – vocals (track 2)
- Jason Nava as Dazed Stoner – voice (track 4)
- Sonny Tipton as Officer Babbit – narrator (tracks: 6, 12, 17)
- Vicky Calhoun – vocals (track 9)
- Joseph "Violent J" Bruce – vocals (track 12)
- Joseph "Shaggy 2 Dope" Ultser – vocals (track 12)
- Robert "Dog Boy" Rogers – vocals (track 15)
- Bill "Big B" Mahoney – vocals (track 17)

Technical

- Jim Perkins – guitar & producer (tracks: 15, 17)
- Mike Kumagai – producer, mixing, engineering
- Patrick "P-Nice" Shevelin – mixing, engineering
- Tom Baker – mastering
- Kevin Zinger – executive producer, management
- Casey Quintal – art direction, design
- Fabrice Henssens – photography
- Derek Plank – photography
- Luke Tarnowski – illustration
- Ivory Daniel – management
- Ron Opaleski – booking

== Charts ==
Chart (2010)	Peak position
US Billboard 200	26
US Independent Albums (Billboard)	3
US Top Alternative Albums (Billboard)	4
US Top Rap Albums (Billboard)	3
US Top Rock Albums (Billboard)	6
