= Menace to Sobriety (OPM album) =

Studio album by OPM
- Released: August 15, 2000
- Recorded: 2000
- Studio: MNO (Los Angeles, California); Axis Recording (New York City, New York); The Mix Room (Los Angeles, California); Record Plant (Los Angeles, California); A&M (Hollywood, California); Soundcastle (Los Angeles, California)
- Length: 47:53
- Label: Atlantic
- Producer: Michael Patterson; OPM; Josh Deutsch; Craig Kallman; Garry Hughes

OPM chronology
Menace to Sobriety (2000)	ForThemAsses (2004)

Alternative cover
- 2015 release front cover

Singles from Menace to Sobriety
- 1. "Heaven Is a Halfpipe" Released: November 6, 2000; 2. "El Capitan" Released: 2001; 3. "Stash Up" Released: 2001

Professional ratings
Review scores
Source	Rating
AllMusic	2/5 stars

Menace to Sobriety is the debut studio album by American rock group OPM. It was released in August 2000 via Atlantic Records, and was re-released on September 8, 2015, as part of its 15-year anniversary. There is also a clean version of the album, which removes most of the profanities used on the explicit version and any drug references.

The album spawned three charted singles and music videos for: "Heaven Is a Halfpipe" (which also reached #68 in Triple J's Hottest 100 for the year 2000 in Australia), "El Capitan" and "Stash Up".

== Track listing ==
No.	Title	Length
1.	"Stash Up"	2:58
2.	"Punanny" (Interlude)	0:33
3.	"Heaven Is a Halfpipe"	4:18
4.	"El Capitan"	3:21
5.	"Undercover Freak"	3:47
6.	"Brighter Side"	3:32
7.	"Better Daze"	3:58
8.	"Trucha"	4:01
9.	"Dealerman"	3:40
10.	"Reality Check"	3:58
11.	"Rage Against the Coke Machine" (Interlude)	1:03
12.	"Unda"	2:50
13.	"15 Minutes" (Interlude)	0:45
14.	"Fish out of Water"	3:33
15.	"Sound System" ("War on Drugs" (hidden track))	6:03
Total length:		47:53

Australia Bonus Track
No.	Title	Length
16.	"Space People"	3:46
Total length:		51:09

Special Edition 2002
No.	Title	Length
16.	"El Capitan" (Soulchild Remix)	3:33
Total length:		50:56

15 Year Anniversary 2015 Bonus Track
No.	Title	Length
16.	"Feel the Pain"	3:16
Total length:		50:40

=== B-sides ===
1. "Space People" - 3:45 (from Heaven Is a Halfpipe CD single)
2. "Group Therapy" - 2:20 (from Heaven Is a Halfpipe CD single)
3. "El Capitan (SoulChild Remix)" - 3:37 (from El Capitan CD single)
4. "Undercover Freak (007 Version)" (from El Capitan CD single)
5. "Stash Up (Funk Food Remix)" (from Stash Up Maxi single)
6. "Heaven Is A Halfpipe (Original Demo)" - 4:21 (from Stash Up Maxi single)

== Personnel ==
- OPM – producers (tracks: 1, 4, 6–8, 10, 12, 14), co-producers (track 9), art direction & design
- Matthew Meschery – vocals (tracks: 1, 3–10, 12, 14), keyboards (tracks: 7, 8, 10), programming (tracks: 1, 8)
- John Edney – vocals (tracks: 1, 3–10, 12, 14), cover, illustration
- Geoff "Casper" Turney – guitar (tracks: 1, 3–10, 12, 14)
- Ronald Keys Jr. – scratches (tracks: 4, 8, 14)

Additional musicians

- James Kevin Dotson – vocals (tracks: 5–7, 12), bass (tracks: 1, 4, 6, 7, 12, 14), guitar (tracks: 1, 3, 5–7, 9, 12, 14), keyboards (track 14)
- Angelo Moore – vocals (tracks: 7, 12), saxophone (track 12)
- Asdru Sierra – vocals & horns (track 8)
- Ulises Bella – vocals & horns (track 8)
- Miguel Ángel Huidobro Preciado – vocals (track 8)
- Brady Willmon – vocals (track 10), beatboxing (track 14)
- Garry Hughes – keyboards & drum programming (tracks: 3, 5, 9), producer (track 15), co-producer (tracks: 3. 5. 9)
- Nat Gleason – piano (track 3), keyboards (tracks: 4, 12)
- Eric Avery – guitar (track 1)
- Josh Deutsch – guitar (tracks: 3, 5), bass (track 3), drum programming (tracks: 3, 5, 9), producer (tracks: 3, 5, 9, 15)
- Rusty Anderson – guitar (track 3)
- David Rainger – guitar & bass (track 5)
- David Mansfield – pedal steel guitar (track 9)
- Sean E Demott – guitar (track 10), bass (tracks: 8, 10)
- Melvin Gibbs – bass (tracks: 3, 9)
- Leslie Van Trease – drums (tracks: 6, 7, 9, 12, 14)
- Michael Patterson – drum programming (tracks: 3, 5), programming (tracks: 1, 4, 6, 10, 12), producer (tracks: 1, 2, 4, 6–8, 10–14), co-producer (track 5), engineering (tracks: 3, 5, 8, 9), mixing (tracks: 3, 4, 8, 9, 12), recording (tracks: 1, 4, 6–8, 12, 14)
- Alan Friedman – drum programming (track 3)
- Ryan Boesch – programming (tracks: 8, 10)
- Mike Pandos – percussion (track 7)
- Jiro Yamaguchi – percussion (track 8)
- Daniel Deutsch – harmonica (track 5)
- Dylan Ramos – beatboxing (track 14)
- Paige Taite – beatboxing (track 14)
- Malcolm Michiles – scratches (tracks: 3, 5, 15)
- Craig Kallman – producer (tracks: 3, 5, 9)
- Samuel Vaughan Merrick IV – engineering (tracks: 3, 5, 9)
- Jeff Moleski – engineering (track 5), additional recording (tracks: 7, 12)
- David Kahne – mixing (track 5)
- Stephen Marcussen – mastering
- Stewart Whitmore – digital editor
- Thomas Bricker – art direction & design
- Kristin J. Klosterman – photography
- Sean Murphy – photography
- Cindy Hartman – A&R coordinator
- Kevin Williams – A&R

== Charts ==
Chart (2000–01)	Peak position
Austrian Albums (Ö3 Austria)	23
German Albums (Offizielle Top 100)	32
Scottish Albums (OCC)	22
Swiss Albums (Schweizer Hitparade)	66
UK Albums (OCC)	31
UK Rock & Metal Albums (OCC)	5
US Heatseekers Albums (Billboard)	22

== Certifications ==
Region	Certification	Certified units/sales
United Kingdom (BPI)	Silver	60,000^{^}
^{^} Shipments figures based on certification alone.
