= Royal Highness (album) =

Studio album by Kottonmouth Kings
- Released: August 11, 1998
- Recorded: 1998
- Studios: A&M (Hollywood, California); Can-Am (Tarzana, California); Ogden House; 1605 (Huntington Beach, California)
- Genre: Rap
- Length: 1:13:40
- Labels: Suburban Noize; Capitol
- Producers: Daddy X (also exec.); Dog Boy; I Timothy; Marco Forcone; Mellow B. De Lear

Kottonmouth Kings chronology
| Royal Highness (1998) | High Society (2000) |

Singles from Royal Highness
- 1. "Dog's Life" Released: 1998; 2. "Life Ain't What It Seems/Suburban Life" Released: 1998; 3. "Bump" Released: 1999

Royal Highness is the debut studio album by American hip hop group Kottonmouth Kings. It was released on August 11, 1998, through Suburban Noize/Capitol Records. The recording sessions took place at A&M Studios in Hollywood, at Can-Am Recorders in California, at the Ogden House, and at 1605 Studios in Huntington Beach. The album was produced by member Daddy X, who also served as executive producer, Mellow B. De Lear, Marco Forcone, Dog Boy, and I Timothy. It features guest appearances from Too Rude and Humble Gods.

The album peaked at number 17 on the Billboard Heatseekers Albums chart. The song "Bump" peaked at number 28 on the Hot Modern Rock Tracks chart. "Suburban Life" was on the soundtrack for the movie Scream 2, and was even briefly featured in the film itself. "Dog's Life" was on the soundtrack for the movie Lost and Found.

== Critical reception ==
Professional ratings
Review scores
| Source | Rating |
|---|---|
| AllMusic | 2/5 stars |

The Los Angeles Times concluded that "the CD ends up a sour and dispiriting experience because it forces us to keep extended company with a trio of rappers who put everything into sullen attitude and can't find the wit to skewer targets inventively or the self-mockery to find some humor in their lot."

== Track listing ==
| No. | Title | Writer(s) | Producer(s) | Length |
|---|---|---|---|---|
| 1. | "Bong Tokin' Alcoholics" | Brad Xavier; Dustin Miller; Steven Thronson | Daddy X | 3:59 |
| 2. | "Play On" | Xavier; Miller; Thronson; AK Brothers | Daddy X | 4:51 |
| 3. | "Suburban Life" | Xavier; Miller; Thronson | Daddy X | 3:29 |
| 4. | "Life Ain't What It Seems" | Xavier; Miller; Thronson | Daddy X; Mellow B. De Lear | 3:42 |
| 5. | "So High" | Xavier; Miller; Thronson; AK Bros. | Daddy X | 4:19 |
| 6. | "Big Hoss" | Xavier; Miller; Thronson | Daddy X | 2:59 |
| 7. | "Spies" (featuring Humble Gods) | Xavier; Miller; Thronson; Marco Forcone | Daddy X; Marco Forcone | 3:51 |
| 8. | "Bump" | Xavier; Miller; Thronson | Marco Forcone | 4:11 |
| 9. | "Dog's Life" (featuring Too Rude) | Xavier; Miller; Thronson; Robert Rogers | Daddy X; Dog Boy; I Timothy | 4:26 |
| 10. | "Misunderstood" | Xavier; Miller; Thronson; Chris Kay; Michael Kay; Bek David Campbell; John King; Mike Simpson | Daddy X | 3:21 |
| 11. | "Dirt Slang" | Xavier; Miller; Thronson | Daddy X | 2:34 |
| 12. | "What's Your Trip" | Xavier; Miller; Thronson | Daddy X | 3:53 |
| 13. | "High Society" | Xavier; Miller; Thronson | Daddy X | 3:40 |
| 14. | "Psychedelic Funk" | Xavier; Miller; Thronson | Daddy X | 4:58 |
| 15. | "Me & My Skate" | Xavier; Miller; Thronson | Daddy X; Mellow B. De Lear | 4:31 |
| 16. | "Discombobulated" (featuring Too Rude) | Xavier; Miller; Thronson; Rogers | Daddy X | 4:10 |
| 17. | "Planet Budtron" | Xavier; Miller; Thronson; Mellow B. De Lear | Daddy X; Mellow B. De Lear | 4:56 |
| 18. | "Pimp Twist" (hidden track) | | | 4:35 |
| Total length: | | | | 1:13:40 |

Notes

- All tracks have a printed duration of 4:20.
- Early versions of the CD included "Pimp Twist" as track 18 and did not include "Bump (Remix – Radio Edit)".

Sample credits

- Track 10 contains interpolations of "Smoke Two Joints", written by Chris Kay and Michael Kay and "Where It's At", written by Bek David Campbell, John King and Michael Simpson.

== Personnel ==
- Kottonmouth Kings – tracking (tracks: 1–6, 8, 10, 11, 13–17)
- Brad "Daddy X" Xavier – main artist, lyrics, vocals, producer, executive producer
- Steven "Saint Dog" Thronson – main artist, lyrics, vocals, liner notes
- Dustin "D-Loc" Miller – main artist, lyrics, vocals
- Robert "DJ Bobby B" Adams – main artist
- Patrick "Pakelika" Cochrun – main artist
- Humble Gods – featured artists (track 7)
- Too Rude – featured artists (tracks: 9, 16)
- Sean E. Demott – guitar & bass (tracks: 1, 3, 12)
- Robert "Dog Boy" Rogers – vocals & producer (track 9)
- Eric Endo – guitar (track 9)
- Mark Tyson – bass (track 9)
- Dave Stenhouse – piano (track 9)
- Doug Sanborn – drums (track 9)
- Timothy Moynahan – trombone (tracks: 9, 16), horn arrangement & producer (track 9)
- Alan Lomax – trumpet (tracks: 9, 16)
- Unity Horns – horns (track 9), horn arrangement (track 16)
- Matt Kalin – horn arrangement (track 9)
- BJ Smith – keyboards & percussion (tracks: 13, 16)
- Kona-Gold – voice (track 14)
- Myla Martin – voice (track 15)
- John "Geetus" Aguto – engineering & mixing (tracks: 1, 6, 10–12, 14, 16)
- AK Brothers – tracking (tracks: 1, 3)
- Phil Kaffel – engineering (tracks: 2, 3, 5, 13), mixing (tracks: 2, 3, 5, 9, 13)
- Patrick Thrasher – engineering assistant & mixing assistant (tracks: 2, 5, 13)
- Eric "E-Man" Adger – tracking (tracks: 2, 5, 13, 16)
- Mellow B. De Lear – producer & engineering (tracks: 4, 15, 17), tracking (tracks: 4, 6, 17), mixing (tracks: 4, 15, 17)
- Darian Rundall – engineering (track 7), tracking (tracks: 7, 9)
- Marco Forcone – producer & mixing (tracks: 7, 8), engineering & tracking (track 8)
- Joseph Bishara – tracking (track 8)
- 2-Swift – tracking (tracks: 10, 15)
- Pimpdaddies – tracking (track 14)
- Patrick Shevelin – engineering assistant & mixing assistant (track 16)
- Ross Patrick – art direction, design
- Carter Gibbs – logo
- David Kramer – photography
- Craig Aaronson – A&R

== Charts ==
| Chart (1998) | Peak position |
|---|---|
| US Heatseekers Albums (Billboard) | 17 |
