= Re-Invention =

Studio album by Too Rude
- Released: October 26, 2004
- Genre: Reggae, reggae rock, punk rock, dub
- Label: Suburban Noize Records

Too Rude chronology
Too Rude (2000)	Re-Invention (2004)

Re-Invention is the second album of the reggae punk band Too Rude, released on 26 October 2004. This album follows the debut self-titled album Too Rude, released on 4 April 2000.

== Track listing ==
#	Title	Time
1	Tribal War	3:33
2	The Distance	3:10
3	Local Dub	3:45
4	Reach Out	3:28
5	421	4:25
6	The Day	3:24
7	No Short Cuts	3:28
8	Slick Mind	4:25
9	Addict Like This	4:27
10	Ditchin' Work	4:01
11	The Call	3:25
12	Good Day To Die	3:45
13	Re-Invention	2:57
14	Nothing To Defend	2:40
15	Slow Burn	4:02
16	421 Dub	4:09
