= California Poppy (album) =

Studio album by OPM
- Released: July 18, 2006
- Length: 51:09
- Label: Suburban Noize
- Producer: OPM

OPM chronology
ForThemAsses (2004)	California Poppy (2006)	Golden State Of Mind (2008)

California Poppy is the third album by California band OPM, released on July 18, 2006. It spawned two music videos: "For Tonight" and "Rock Me Slow".

== Track listing ==
1. "Intro" - 0:30
2. "For Tonight" - 3:43
3. "Lion's Pride" - 5:01
4. "Rock Me Slow" - 3:53
5. "Love Don't" - 3:08
6. "Somewhere (Further Than The Valley)" - 4:22
7. "Desire" - 4:24
8. "Right Now" - 4:21
9. "Leave 'em For Dead" - 4:42
10. "Interlude" - 0:25
11. "Voodoo Hex" - 3:09
12. "That's The Sound" - 4:31
13. "Born Again Virgin" (Contains hidden track "For Tonight (remix)") - 9:00

== Band Line-up ==
- John E. Necro - Lead Vocals
- Big B - Rapping
- Geoff Turney - Guitar
- Jonathan Williams - Keyboards
- Matt Rowe - Bass
- Robert aka The Skatanic Mechanic Bradley - Drums
