= Sunrise Sessions =

Studio album by Kottonmouth Kings
- Released: July 19, 2011
- Studios: The Cannibus Cabin; Electric Ghetto
- Genre: Rap rock
- Length: 1:14:59
- Label: Suburban Noize Records
- Producers: Daddy X; Mike Kumagai

Kottonmouth Kings chronology
Long Live The Kings (2010)	Sunrise Sessions (2011)	Mile High (2012)

Alternative covers
- Best Buy edition and vinyl edition cover

Singles from Sunrise Sessions
- 1. "Love Lost" Released: June 7, 2011; 2. "Boom Clap Sound" Released: June 28, 2011; 3. "Cruzin'" Released: September 27, 2011

Professional ratings
Review scores
Source	Rating
AllMusic	3.5/5 stars
RapReviews	6/10

Sunrise Sessions is the eleventh studio album American hip hop group Kottonmouth Kings. It was released on July 19, 2011, via Suburban Noize Records. Recording sessions took place at the Cannibus Cabin and Electric Ghetto. Production was handled by member Daddy X, who also served as executive producer together with Kevin Zinger, and Mike Kumagai, with additional production by Brad Jones, Jim Perkins, Patrick Shevelin and Steve Dang. It features guest appearances from Jared Gomes, BJ Smith and Crystal Frandsen. The album peaked at number 46 on the Billboard 200, number 7 on the Independent Albums, and number 8 on the Top Rap Albums chart in the United States.

According to the band, the record has a more prominent reggae sound than previous albums, as well as dubstep and bluegrass influences. The band recorded over 60 songs for the album; some of the b-sides are included as bonus tracks on special editions of the album, and others are included on Hidden Stash V: Bongloads & B-Sides, which was released later in 2011.

== Track listing ==
CD version

Standard edition
No.	Title	Length
1.	"Stonetown"	4:37
2.	"Love Lost"	5:34
3.	"Down 4 Life" (featuring Jahred of (həd) ^{p.e.})	4:45
4.	"Kalifornia"	4:52
5.	"My Garden"	4:59
6.	"Boom Clap Sound"	4:58
7.	"Back Home"	5:00
8.	"She's Dangerous"	4:55
9.	"Ganja Daze"	4:55
10.	"Stay Stoned"	3:03
11.	"Stoned Silly"	4:25
12.	"Closing Time"	4:54
13.	"Cruzin"	3:33
14.	"Great To Be Alive"	4:22
15.	"Be Alright"	4:20
16.	"Said and Done"	5:47
Total length:		1:14:59

bonus disc (Best Buy edition)
No.	Title	Length
1.	"Back in Cali"	4:31
2.	"Life For Me"	5:26
3.	"Our Time"	4:14
4.	"I Don't Wanna Run"	3:38
5.	"My Vibrations"	3:54

bonus disc (Kottonmouth Kings official store)
No.	Title	Length
1.	"Defy Gravity"
2.	"Rise Above"
3.	"Summertime"
4.	"New World Stoners"
5.	"Soon Come"

Bonus tracks
No.	Title	Length
17.	"Stay Stoned (extended mix)" (Digital edition bonus track)	10:17
18.	"Live, Love, Laugh (All I Wanna Do)" (FYE edition bonus track)
19.	"Legalize It" (Hastings edition bonus track)

Limited Edition vinyl

Sunrise Session (Side 1)
No.	Title	Length
1.	"My Garden"
2.	"Love Lost"
3.	"Kalifornia"
4.	"Back Home"
5.	"Ganja Daze"

Sunset Session (Side 2)
No.	Title	Length
1.	"Boom Clap Sound"
2.	"Stoned Silly"
3.	"Cruzin"
4.	"Be Alright"
5.	"Closing Time"

== Personnel ==
Kottonmouth Kings

- Brad "Daddy X" Xavier – performer, producer, executive producer
- Dustin "D-Loc" Miller – performer, art direction
- Timothy "Johnny Richter" McNutt – performer
- David "The Dirtball" Alexander – performer
- Luiz "Lou Dog" Gaez – performer
- Robert "DJ Bobby B" Adams – performer

Additional personnel

- Crystal Frandsen – additional vocals (tracks: 1, 2, 9, 10)
- Jared Gomes – additional vocals (track 3)
- BJ "Pimp Daddy" Smith – additional vocals (tracks: 5, 6, 11, 12, 15)
- Jim Perkins – additional vocals (tracks: 5, 13, 15), additional producer (track 13)
- Daniel "Judge D" Rogers – vox (track 4)
- Greg "Gnote" Russell – guitar (track 4)
- Dirk Freymuth – guitar (tracks: 5, 9, 12, 14)
- Smoking Scotty Dred – guitar (track 8)
- Rich "Legz Diamond" Murrell – guitar (track 10)
- Alex Alessandroni – keyboards & organs (tracks: 4, 5, 10, 15)
- Mike Kumangai – producer, mixing
- Brad Jones – additional producer (track 1)
- Steve Dang – additional producer (track 4)
- Patrick Shevelin – additional producer (tracks: 10, 11), mixing
- Tom Baker – mastering
- Kevin Zinger – executive producer, management
- Chad Carothers – illustration
- Richard Lauderbach – illustration
- Markus Cuff – photography
- Ray Brown – layout
- Ivory Daniel – management

== Charts ==
Chart (2011)	Peak position
US Billboard 200	46
US Top Rap Albums (Billboard)	8
US Independent Albums (Billboard)	7
