= Matthew Meschery =

American vocalist and programmer

Kid Kreation
- Birth name: Matthew Thomas Meschery
- Also known as: Kid Kreation, Shakey Lo the Creation Kid
- Born: April 12, 1975 (age 50); Truckee, California, US
- Origin: San Francisco, California
- Genres: Rap rock, pop, hip hop, ska
- Occupation(s): Singer, vocals, keyboards, programmer
- Years active: 1999–present
- Labels: Atlantic Records

Matthew Thomas Meschery a.k.a. Shakey Lo the Creation Kid (born April 12, 1975) is a vocalist and programmer. He is best known for being the original lead vocalist of the California based band OPM. His father is former basketball player Tom Meschery.

== Early career ==
Before becoming involved in music, Meschery was a substitute teacher in Oakland, California. He then became a teacher at a school for "at-risk" children (both in and out of the juvenile justice system) in Santa Cruz, California. Then in 1999 he became one of the founders of OPM, along with then brother-in-law John E. Necro and his friend Casper a.k.a. Geoff Turney. He became a songwriter as well as lead vocalist during his time with the band. He co-wrote the band's best known song "Heaven Is a Halfpipe" from the album Menace to Sobriety. He featured on an episode of Never Mind the Buzzcocks on September 10, 2001.

== Departure ==
In early 2002 after the Menace to Sobriety tour Matthew Meschery decided to leave the band. John E. Necro stated "that was the biggest blow of anyone" and "I don't think Matthew thought it through. It seemed like a really good idea when we got started, but it was more than he bargained for." during an interview in 2009. In the October 2015 edition of Rock Sound magazine, Meschery revealed he would "often get stage fright" when performing live and "The idea of touring another record for two years felt pretty daunting. I was done." Matthew then started working at KQED-FM shortly after leaving. Matthew along with Etienne Franc and Gary Dean then formed a band by the name of "The Free Agency" in 2003 after they all departed OPM. As of 2007, Meschery had been working for ITVS. He is currently in a new band called "Brand New Heartache" alongside former OPM bassist Etienne Franc.
