= Mile High (album) =

Studio album by Kottonmouth Kings
- Released: August 14, 2012
- Recorded: 2012
- Studio: The Kottonmouth Kompound
- Genre: Hip Hop
- Length: 1:17:30
- Label: Suburban Noize Records
- Producer: Daddy X; Mike Kumagai; Ceekay Jones; Makerz

Kottonmouth Kings chronology
Sunrise Sessions (2011)	Mile High (2012)	Krown Power (2015)

Professional ratings
Review scores
Source	Rating
AllMusic	3.5/5 stars
Faygoluvers	4/5 stars
HipHopDX	2.5/5
RapReviews	6/10

Mile High is the twelfth studio album by American rap rock group Kottonmouth Kings. It was released on August 14, 2012 via Suburban Noize Records. Recording sessions took place at the Kottonmouth Kompound. Production was handled by Mike Kumagai and member Daddy X with additional production from John Edney and Steve Dang, except for the song "Mr. Cali Man", which was produced by Ceekay Jones and Makerz. It features guest appearances from Saint Dog, Ceekay Jones, Jahred, Mickey Avalon and Twiztid.

The album peaked at number 36 on the Billboard 200, number 9 on the Independent Albums, number 10 on both the Top Rock Albums and the Top Alternative Albums, and number 7 on the Top Rap Albums chart in the United States. As of August 2015, it has sold 28,000 copies in the United States.

== Track listing ==
No.	Title	Length
1.	"Pound 4 Pound"	4:48
2.	"Hold It In"	5:09
3.	"Roll Us a Joint"	3:40
4.	"Get Some"	4:01
5.	"Packin' the Goods"	4:36
6.	"Kottonmouth Bitch"	3:52
7.	"Get Out the Way" (featuring Saint Dog)	4:27
8.	"Boombox"	3:41
9.	"Green Dreams (Mile High)"	4:52
10.	"Bounce"	3:21
11.	"High Haters"	4:11
12.	"Honey Dip" (featuring Mickey Avalon)	4:30
13.	"Mr. Cali Man" (featuring Saint Dog and CeeKay Jones)	3:43
14.	"Watch Out" (featuring Twiztid)	3:45
15.	"This Addiction"	3:50
16.	"End of Rope" (featuring Jahred of (həd) ^{p.e.})	3:37
17.	"Judgement Day" (featuring Saint Dog)	6:25
18.	"Fight For Your Life"	5:02
Total length:		1:17:30

iTunes bonus tracks
No.	Title	Length
19.	"Judgement Day" (featuring Swollen Members)	6:54
20.	"Rock Star"	5:11

F.Y.E. bonus disc
No.	Title	Length
19.	"Sunpower" (featuring Saint Dog)
20.	"We Stay High"

Hastings bonus download track
No.	Title	Length
19.	"Mr. Cali Man (Remix)"

The Royal Family EP (Best Buy bonus disc)
No.	Title	Length
19.	"Still Blowing Smoke Rings" (featuring Saint Dog)	4:21
20.	"Corner Bag Blues" (featuring Saint Dog)	5:31
21.	"Bounce" (featuring Saint Dog)	4:08
22.	"High Haters" (featuring Saint Dog)	5:18
23.	"Judgement Day (Extended Mix)" (featuring Saint Dog)	7:09

== Personnel ==
- Brad "Daddy X" Xavier – producer, arranger, executive producer
- David "The Dirtball" Alexander – arranger
- Steven "Saint Dog" Thronson – vocals (tracks: 7, 13, 17)
- Yeshe "Mickey Avalon" Perl – vocals (track 12)
- Ceekay Jones – vocals & producer (track 13)
- James "Jamie Madrox" Spaniolo – vocals (track 14)
- Paul "Monoxide Child" Methric – vocals (track 14)
- Paulo Sergio "Jared" Gomes – vocals (track 16)
- BJ Smith – backing vocals (tracks: 5, 9)
- Crystal Ball – backing vocals (track 12)
- Mike Kumagai – producer, mixing
- Makerz – producer (track 13)
- John Edney – engineering, additional producer & mixing
- Steve Dang – engineering, additional producer & mixing
- Kevin Zinger – executive producer, management
- Dane Hollquist – cover artwork
- Maggie St. Thomas – photography
- Alex Rauch – layout
- Ivory Daniel – management

== Charts ==
Chart (2012)	Peak position
US Billboard 200	36
US Independent Albums (Billboard)	9
US Top Alternative Albums (Billboard)	10
US Top Rap Albums (Billboard)	7
US Top Rock Albums (Billboard)	10
