= Droppin Bombs =

Compilation album by Subnoize Souljaz
- Released: August 29, 2006
- Recorded: 2006
- Genre: Hip-hop
- Language: English
- Label: Suburban Noize
- Producer: Brad "Daddy X", Mike Kumagai, Patrick "P-Nice" Shevelin

Subnoize Souljaz chronology
Sub Noize Souljaz (2005)	Droppin Bombs (2006)	Blast From the Past (2009)

Droppin Bombs is a compilation album by Suburban Noize Records, released on August 29, 2006. The album is a twenty track collaboration between all the artists signed to Suburban Noize Records. In the week of September 16, 2006, Droppin Bombs had reached #38 on the Billboard's Independent Albums chart and #44 on the Billboard's Top Heatseekers chart.

== Track listing ==
#	Title	Featured artist(s)	Time
1.	"Here We Go Again"	Big B, Dirtball, and Daddy X	3:55
2.	"Uncle Sam"	Saint Dog, Daddy X, and Judge D	5:02
3.	"Let Us Know"	Big B and Dirtball	3:36
4.	"Still Smokin"	The Original Kottonmouth Kings	4:02
5.	"Mayday"	Big B, Dirtball, and Daddy X	4:29
6.	"Get Em Up"	Jared of Hed PE, Big B, Dirtball, Daddy X, and Chucky Styles	4:28
7.	"Feels So Good"	D-Loc	3:31
8.	"U Can Hate Me"	Big B, Chucky Styles, and Judge D	3:42
9.	"Set Me Free"	Saint Dog and Daddy X	4:15
10.	"One Life"	Judge D, Daddy X, D-Loc, and Johnny Richter	4:06
11.	"All Night Long"	Big B, Dirtball, and Daddy X	4:03
12.	"Flyin High"	Daddy X, Chucky Styles, Dirtball, and Pakelika	3:29
13.	"In The Trenches"	Brother J, Judge D and Daddy X	2:24
14.	"Pull The Pin"	Dirtball, Saint Dog, and Chucky Styles	2:30
15.	"Droppin Bombs" Ft. Twiztid	Big B, Dirtball, and Daddy X	3:59
16.	"Locomotion"	Daddy X, Brother J, and Tristate	4:09
17.	"On The Rise"	Big B, Dirtball, and Daddy X	3:48
18.	"Funny Feelins"	Dirtball and Daddy X	3:29
19.	"We Are"	One Session	3:48
20.	"Camp RADD"	Last Laugh and Johnny Richter	3:40
