= Sub Noize Souljaz =

Mixtape by Subnoize Souljaz
- Released: February 15, 2005
- Recorded: 2004
- Genre: Hip hop
- Label: Suburban Noize
- Producer: Brad "Daddy X", Kevin Zinger

Subnoize Souljaz chronology
| Sub Noize Souljaz (2005) | Droppin Bombs (2006) |

Sub Noize Souljaz is a mixtape by Suburban Noize Records released on February 15, 2005. Sub Noize Souljaz is a fifteen track collaboration unifying the whole Sub Noize label in many combinations. Sub Noize head group the Kottonmouth Kings join with label mates Big B, Judge D, Saint Dog, and more including newcomers Dirtball, and Chucky Styles who make their impressive debut. This CD contains tracks with Saint Dog, Richter, D-Loc, and Brad X performing together for the first time since 1999 when Saint Dog parted ways with the Kottonmouth Kings. This challenges of an album demonstrated the unique bond that is the "Subnoize Family".

== Track listing ==
| # | Title | Featured Artist | Time |
|---|---|---|---|
| 1 | Frontline | Kottonmouth Kings, Big B, Judge D, Saint Dog, Big Hoss, John E. Necro, Dirtball, Just Cause, and Chucky Styles | 8:08 |
| 2 | Keep a Look Out | Johnny Richter, D-Loc, and Judge D | 4:02 |
| 3 | Crazy | Big B | 3:41 |
| 4 | Souljaz Story | Judge D and Johnny Richter | 3:27 |
| 5 | Summertime | Big B, Saint Dog, and Johnny Richter | 4:00 |
| 6 | Dust 2 Dust | Judge D and D-Loc | 3:11 |
| 7 | One By One | Tax man, Judge D, Big B, and Chucky Styles | 3:26 |
| 8 | P,P,P, Pimp | Dirtball, Saint Dog, and Just Cause | 3:20 |
| 9 | Live Life Quick | Big B, Just Cause, and Saint Dog | 3:53 |
| 10 | We Bad | Dirtball, Chucky Styles, and Just Cause | 3:15 |
| 11 | Let's Ride | D-Loc, Johnny Richter, Daddy X | 2:47 |
| 12 | Sub Noize Tribe | Big B, Saint Dog, and Judge D | 2:58 |
| 13 | Push Up Ya Knucks | Dirtball and Daddy X | 3:48 |
| 14 | Drama | Saint Dog and John E. Necro | 3:40 |
| 15 | Never Gonna Hold Me Down | Johnny Richter and T. J. Lavin | 5:00 |
| 16 | Love life (bonus track for Japan) | Dirtball | 3:25 |
