= OPM (band) =

American rock/pop band

- Origin: Los Angeles, California, U.S.
- Genres: Rock, hip hop, pop, reggae
- Years active: 1999–present
- Labels: Atlantic, Suburban Noize, MNO
- Members: John E. Necro; Geoff Turney; Jonathan Williams; Carlos Perez
- Past members: Matthew Meschery; Big B Gary P. Dean; Etienne Franc; Billy Flynn; Robert Bradley; Matt Rowe; Shane Mayo
- Website: opmden.com

OPM is an American band based in Los Angeles. OPM has a distinctive sound, combining hip hop, rock music, and pop with laid-back reggae.

== History ==
Originally called Stash, the name OPM, according to the band's frontman John E. Necro, is an abbreviation of the phrase "Open People's Minds" (originally "Other People's Money"). This was stated during an interview with MarijuanaRadio.com. The name also sounds like the drug opium. The band's original members were John E. Necro, Matthew Meschery and Geoff Turney, with Gary Dean and Etienne Franc later appointed permanent members in 2001. Necro and Turney aka Casper first met on a bus ride with their girlfriends in 1996. At the time Necro was a label scout at Island Records and Turney was in a band called "Alpha Jerk". In 1997 Necro invited Turney to do some recordings with him and his then brother-in-law Matthew Meschery. After two years they finally managed to start writing songs and sent a three-track demo to Atlantic Records, leading them to get signed despite having never played live together. OPM released their debut album, Menace to Sobriety, in August 2000 on Atlantic Records. Their debut single "Heaven Is a Halfpipe" charted worldwide and won the Kerrang! Award for Best Single. They performed their hit single on Top of the Pops on July 20, 2001.

After the Menace to Sobriety tour, Meschery decided to leave the band. Necro stated "that was the biggest blow of anyone" and "I don't think Matthew thought it through. It seemed like a really good idea when we got started, but it was more than he bargained for" during an interview in 2009. In the October 2015 edition of Rock Sound, Matthew revealed he would "often get stage fright" when performing live and "The idea of touring another record for two years felt pretty daunting. I was done." Meschery along with Etienne Franc and Gary Dean then formed a band by the name of "The Free Agency" in 2003 after they all departed OPM. As of 2007, Meschery was working for ITVS.

In 2002, they replaced Meschery with Big B and signed to Suburban Noize Records. They left Atlantic Records as they were not interested in releasing another OPM album. Necro spoke of this in 2004 by saying "They'd spent so much to promote the first album, that we thought everything was a go with the second record. But they kept sending us back into the studio … we wrote over 50 songs while waiting for the label to make a move. We finally got to the point where we realized that we needed more attention than they were giving us, so we started working on getting out of our deal." Their second album, ForThemAsses, was released in June 2004. The album was produced by OPM and Steve Gallagher and features guest appearances by reggae artists Yellowman and Eek-A-Mouse along with Johnny Richter of the Kottonmouth Kings. The only single from the album was "Horny", which was released a year later in 2005. Jonathan Williams was then appointed as a permanent member, having provided keyboards for the ForThemAsses album. Matt Rowe was appointed as bass player in 2005 along with Robert Bradley on drums. Their third album was California Poppy, released in July 2006. The album was supported by the release of the In the OPMDEN EP in 2006. In 2008 Robert left the band and was immediately replaced by Carlos Perez. OPM released their fourth album, Golden State of Mind in September 2008. The album was produced by Michael Patterson who also produced the band's debut album. Carlos Perez then left the band to become the drummer for Big B in 2009 and was replaced by Shane Mayo.

The band joined the new label MNO records, founded by John E. and released their single "Holiday Under The Sun" in 2010. In 2012 the band released a new EP called Heaven Can Wait to celebrate 13 years since the band's formation. When asked why a 13th anniversary, Necro said the band was originally planning a 10th anniversary, but due to a band hiatus which involved building a new studio, he said the 10th year "slipped past us, without realizing" and decided on 13 since it is considered an unlucky number. It featured five re-recordings of classic songs. In 2013 they released a new single entitled "Everything's The Same In LA". Matt Rowe and Shane Mayo left the band in 2014 to focus on their other band "Garrett Lee Robinson", who are also signed to OPM's label MNO records. In 2015 Carlos Perez returned to OPM to provide drums after originally leaving the band in 2009.

OPM released their fourth EP entitled The Minge Dynasty in August 2015 as well as announcing a European tour for 2015. The EP features a new single called "Millionaire Like Me". Big B returns to feature on the EP, produced by Ras MG. They also re-released Menace to Sobriety in September 2015 for the 15th anniversary of the release of their debut album. The re-release featured one bonus track called "Feel The Pain", which was one of the band's first songs recorded in 1999 with the original lineup (Necro, Meschery and Turney).

== Members ==
- John E. Necro – vocals (1999–present)
- Geoff Turney – guitars (1999–present)
- Jonathan Williams – keyboards (2004–present)
- Carlos Perez – drums (2008–2009, 2015–present)

Former members

- Alfunction – guitar (live only) (left 2001)
- Avram Brown – guitar & keyboards (live only) (left 2001)
- Mark Van Eps – keyboards (live only – Rock Im Park, Rock Am Ring festival 2001)
- Matthew Meschery aka Shakey Lo the Creation Kid – vocals and programming (1999–2002)
- Gary P. Dean – drums (2000–2002)
- Etienne Franc – bass (2000–2002)
- Will Joyce – bass (live only) (2004)
- Billy Flynn – drums (live only) (2004–2005)
- Big B – vocals (2002–2005, 2015)
- Robert aka The Skatanic Mechanic Bradley – drums (2005–2008)
- Matt Rowe – bass (2005–2014)
- Shane Mayo – drums (2009–2014)

== Discography ==
=== Albums ===
- Menace to Sobriety (September 2000) – UK No. 31
- ForThemAsses (June 24, 2004)
- California Poppy (July 18, 2006)
- Golden State of Mind (September 2, 2008)

=== EPs ===
- Outlaws, Perverts and Misfits (2004)
- In the OPMDEN (June 18, 2006)
- Heaven Can Wait (September 22, 2012)
- The Minge Dynasty (August 25, 2015)

=== Singles ===
List of singles, with selected chart positions
Title	Year	Peak chart positions										Album
Title	Year	US Alt.	AUS	AUT	GER	IRE	NLD	NZ	SWE	SWI	UK	Album
"Heaven Is a Halfpipe"	2000	18	59	5	20	9	87	30	19	37	4	Menace to Sobriety
"El Capitan"	2001	—	76	—	71	—	—	—	—	—	20	Menace to Sobriety
"Stash Up"	2001	—	—	—	67	—	—	—	—	—	—	Menace to Sobriety
"Horny"	2005	—	100	—	—	—	—	—	—	—	—	ForThemAsses
"Holiday Under the Sun"	2010	—	—	—	—	—	—	—	—	—	—	Non-album singles
"Everything's the Same in LA"	2013	—	—	—	—	—	—	—	—	—	—	Non-album singles
"Millionaire Like Me"	2015	—	—	—	—	—	—	—	—	—	—	The Minge Dynasty
