= Too Rude =

American band

- Origin: Hermosa Beach, California, U.S.
- Genres: Reggae, reggae rock, punk rock
- Label: Suburban Noize Records
- Members: Dogboy- Vocals; Flan- Guitar; Fatal- Guitar/Vocals; Lazy Dread- Bass guitar Kyle- Drums

Too Rude is an American reggae rockband from Hermosa Beach, California, United States. Too Rude was created by the vocalist, Dogboy, and bass guitarist, Lazy Dread.

== Biography ==
Too Rude was started by vocalist Robert Rogers and bassist Lazy Dread, along with guitarist Flan, and guitarist/back-up vocalist Fatal. Too Rude released their debut album, Too Rude July 4, 2000, on Suburban Noize Records. On October 26, 2004, the band released their second album Re-Invention, also on Suburban Noize Records. Robert "Dogboy" Rogers started up a solo career and released Rebel Riddim on Suburban Noize Records April 3, 2007.

== Discography ==
#	Title	Date	Label
1	Too Rude	4 April 2000	Suburban Noize Records
2	Re-Invention	26 October 2004	Suburban Noize Records
