= The Dirtball =

American rapper

- Born: David Alexander; October 17, 1974 (age 52)
- Origin: Prineville, Oregon, U.S.
- Genres: Hip hop; punk rock
- Years active: 1995–present
- Label: Throttle House
- Website: The Dirtball on Facebook

David Alexander (born October 17, 1974), better known by his stage name The Dirtball, is an American rapper. He is a former member of the hip hop group Kottonmouth Kings whom he joined in early 2010 and the punk rock group collaboration X-Pistols with Daddy X also formerly of the Kottonmouth Kings and members of So Cal punk group D.I. Residing in Crook County, Oregon.

== Discography ==
=== Albums ===
- The Dirty D Project Vol. 1 (November 26, 2002)
- Pop-A-D-Ball (March 29, 2005)
- Raptillion (September 19, 2006)
- Crook County (May 19, 2008)
- Nervous System (March 1, 2011)
- Desert Eagle EP (May 22, 2012)
- Skull Hollow (February 22, 2019)
- Back of the Woods (TBA)

=== Compilations ===
- Subnoize Souljaz presents in the Trenches Vol. 3: The Dirtball (2009)

=== Kottonmouth Kings ===
- Long Live the Kings (2010)
- Legalize It (EP) (2011)
- Sunrise Sessions (2011)
- Hidden Stash V: Bongloads & B-Sides (2011)
- Mile High (August 14, 2012)
- Krown Power (August 28, 2015)

=== X-Pistols ===
- Shoot to Kill (2011)
