= Big B (rapper) =

American rapper

- Born: Bryan David Mahoney; July 30, 1972 (age 54); Upland, California, U.S.
- Origin: Las Vegas, Nevada, U.S.
- Genre: Hip hop
- Occupations: Rapper; songwriter; producer
- Years active: 1997–present
- Labels: Suburban Noize; Big Whale; Atlantic
- Member of: OPM
- Website: feedbigb.com

Bryan David Mahoney (born July 30, 1972), known by his stage name Big B, is an American rapper currently signed with Suburban Noize Records as a solo artist. Along with John E. Necro, he performs vocals in the band OPM, which is also signed with Suburban Noize.

== Career ==
=== Early career ===
Mahoney was born in Upland, California and raised in Las Vegas, Nevada. He started out in a Las Vegas-based band, 187, and was also an original member of the bands Spade Brigade and OPM, as well as a co-founder of Controversy Sells.

=== With Suburban Noize ===
DJ Bobby B, D Loc, and Johnny Richter of the Kottonmouth Kings first met Mahoney through freestyle motocross events. They praised Mahoney and his band OPM to the owners of Suburban Noize, including Daddy X, who listened to OPM and were impressed. However, the band was already signed to a major label, Atlantic Records.

Mahoney decided to sign a deal with Suburban Noize, and the following week met Mellow Man Ace and Bronek while in the studio. Ace from Ice-T's team visited the Suburban Noize office and heard some of Mahoney's work, expressing his interest. This resulted in the release of Mahoney's debut solo album, High Class White Trash, on Suburban Noize Records in 2004.

Since then, Mahoney has released several albums, including three with OPM, and has also collaborated with The Dirtball and Subnoize Souljaz. In addition, he was featured on the track "Keep It Simple" for Blaze Ya Dead Homie's album, Clockwork Gray.

Mahoney also collaborated with The Dirtball on a track called "Check Royalty" for the compilation When There's No More Room In Hell Volume 1, released on SugarDaddy Records, an independent label headed by Daddy Long Legs.

In 2009, Mahoney released a duet with Scott Russo from Unwritten Law called "Sinner", which peaked at #23 on Billboard's Alternative Songs.

His 2010 album Good Times & Bad Advice included guest appearances from Everlast, Cisco Adler, and Scott Russo. The album's title track was used in promotional material for Madison Square Gardens.

Mahoney has also appeared as a regular cast member on the A&E television series Inked, focusing on his work at the Hart & Huntington Tattoo Company in Las Vegas. In 2007, he appeared on the Vans Warped tour.

== Discography ==
=== Studio albums ===
Year	Artist	Title	Label
2001	187	Furious	Big Whale
2004	Big B	High Class White Trash	Suburban Noize
2004	OPM	ForThemAsses	Suburban Noize
2005	Big B	White Trash Renegade	Suburban Noize
2006	OPM	California Poppy	Suburban Noize
2006	Big B	Random Stuff	Suburban Noize
2007	Big B	More To Hate	Suburban Noize
2009	OPM	Golden State of Mind	Suburban Noize
2009	Big B	American Underdog	Suburban Noize
2010	Big B	Good Times & Bad Advice	Suburban Noize
2011	Big B	Music for Misfits	Suburban Noize
2011	Big B	Subnoize Collabos	Suburban Noize
2013	Big B	Fool's Gold	Suburban Noize
2020	Big B	Welcome to the Club	Suburban Noize

=== Album appearances ===
Year	Artist	Title	Label
2003	Tsunami Bros.	King Harbor	Suburban Noize
2004	Bizzy Bone	Alpha and Omega	Bungalo Records
2005	Subnoize Souljaz	Sub Noize Souljaz	Suburban Noize
2006	Subnoize Souljaz	Droppin Bombs	Suburban Noize
2006	Various Artists	When There's No More Room In Hell Volume 1	SugarDaddy Records
2006	Kottonmouth Kings	Hidden Stash III	Suburban Noize
2007	Hed PE	Insomnia	Suburban Noize
2007	Blaze Ya Dead Homie	Clockwork Gray	Psychopathic Records
2008	The Dirtball	Crook County	Suburban Noize
2008	Axe Murder Boyz	Gods Hand	Hatchet House
2009	Hed PE	New World Orphans	Suburban Noize
2009	Subnoize Souljaz	Blast from the Past	Suburban Noize
