= Dog Boy (singer) =

Jamaican musician

- Born: Robert Rogers
- Origin: Hermosa Beach, California, United States
- Genres: Reggae; Reggae rock Ska; Rocksteady; Punk rock Dub
- Occupations: Singer, songwriter
- Instrument: Vocals
- Labels: Suburban Noize Records
- Website: Official Dog Boy Site

Dog Boy (born Robert Rogers) is a Jamaican singer and songwriter, currently signed with Suburban Noize Records as a solo artist. Along with his solo project he also supplied vocals for the reggae/punk rock band, Too Rude, who are also signed with Subnoize.

== Biography ==
Along with bass guitarist Lazy Dread, Dog Boy created Too Rude. As time went by Dog Boy became more known for working on the Kottonmouth Kings' first three albums as a featured artist writing such hits as "On the Run" and "Dog's Life" which was featured on the soundtrack for 1999 film, Lost & Found. Whilst in this process Dogboy recorded the debut Too Rude which was released with Suburban Noize Records on 4 April 2000.

After the first album, the second Re-Invention was not released until 26 October 2004.

With Rogers' success, he originally planned to work as a solo artist. Rebel Riddim was released on 3 April 2007. It reached No. 11 on Billboard's Top Reggae Albums chart.

== Discography ==
=== Too Rude ===
#	Title	Date	Label
1	Too Rude	4 April 2000	Suburban Noize Records
2	Re-Invention	26 October 2004	Suburban Noize Records

=== Dog Boy ===
#	Title	Date	Label
1	Rebel Riddim	3 April 2007	Suburban Noize Records
