= Hed PE discography =

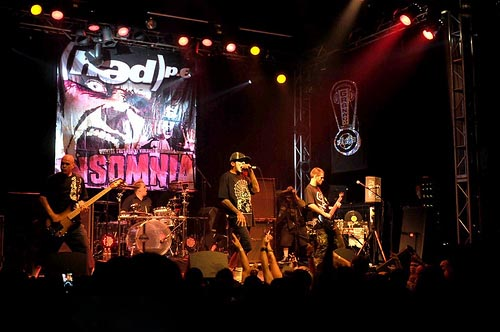
- Hed PE performing live in 2008. From left to right: Mawk Young, Tiny Bubz, Jahred Shane, DJ Product © 1969 and Jaxon Benge
- Studio albums: 12
- Extended plays: 4
- Live albums: 1
- Compilation albums: 3
- Singles: 19
- Music videos: 15

The discography of Hed PE, an American rock band, consists of twelve studio albums, one live album, three compilation albums, four extended plays, seventeen singles, and fourteen music videos.

Formed in Huntington Beach, California in 1994, the band performs a style of music which they refer to as "G-punk". Their music is primarily based in a fusion of punk rock and hip hop music, but they have also incorporated heavy metal and reggae influences. After releasing three albums on Jive Records, Hed PE left the label to record independently, eventually signing with Suburban Noize Records in 2006. They subsequently signed to the label Pavement, and released the album Evolution on July 22, 2014.

== Albums ==
=== Studio albums ===
List of studio albums, with selected chart positions
Title	Album details	Peak chart positions			
Title	Album details	US	US Ind.	AUS	UK
(hed) pe	Released: August 12, 1997; Label: Jive; Formats: CD	—	—	—	—
Broke	Released: August 22, 2000; Label: Jive; Formats: CD, CS, LP	63	—	79	73
Blackout	Released: March 18, 2003; Label: Jive; Formats: CD	33	—	58	102
Only in Amerika	Released: October 19, 2004; Label: Koch; Formats: CD, CS, digital download	186	20	—	—
Back 2 Base X	Released: June 6, 2006; Label: Suburban Noize; Formats: CD, digital download	154	12	—	—
Insomnia	Released: July 17, 2007; Label: Suburban Noize; Formats: CD, digital download	138	16	—	—
New World Orphans	Released: January 13, 2009; Label: Suburban Noize; Formats: CD, digital download	72	4	—	—
Truth Rising	Released: October 26, 2010; Label: Suburban Noize; Formats: CD, digital download	98	13	—	—
Evolution	Released: July 22, 2014; Label: Pavement; Formats: CD, digital download, LP	105	22	—	—
Forever!	Released: July 22, 2016; Label: Pavement; Formats: CD, digital download	—	24	—	—
Stampede	Released: June 21, 2019; Label: Pavement/Suburban Noize; Formats: CD, digital download	—	—	—	—
Class of 2020	Released: August 21, 2020; Label: Suburban Noize/Regime Seventy-Two; Formats: CD, digital download	—	—	—	—
Califas Worldwide	Released: February 4, 2022; Label: Suburban Noize; Formats: CD, digital download	—	—	—	—
Detox	Released: December 15, 2023; Label: Suburban Noize; Formats: CD, digital download	—	—	—	—
Relapse	Released: October 2, 2026; Label: Creator One; Formats: CD, digital download	—	—	—	—
"—" denotes a recording that did not chart or was not released in that territory.

=== Cover albums ===
List of cover albums, with selected chart positions
Title	Album details	Peak chart positions
Title	Album details	US Ind.
70s Hits from the Pit	Released: 2023	

=== Live albums ===
List of live albums, with selected chart positions
Title	Album details	Peak chart positions
Title	Album details	US Ind.
The D.I.Y. Guys	Released: July 8, 2008; Label: Suburban Noize; Formats: CD, digital download	47

=== Compilation albums ===
List of compilation albums
Title	Album details
The Best of (hed) Planet Earth	Released: June 6, 2006; Label: Jive, Legacy; Formats: CD
Major Pain 2 Indee Freedom: The Best of Hed P.E.	Released: June 22, 2010; Label: Suburban Noize; Formats: CD, digital download
The Best of (hed) p.e.	Released: 2013; Label: Suburban Noize; Formats: CD, digital download
Best of the Suburban Noize Years	Released: 2021; Label: Suburban Noize; Formats: LP
Best of Unauthorized	Released: 2025; Label: Suburban Noize; Formats: CD, digital download

== Extended plays ==
List of extended plays
Title	EP details
(Hed)8 Track (EP)	Released: 1994; Formats: CD
Church of Realities	Released: 1995; Formats: CD
Only in Amerika EP	Released: 2004; Label: Koch; Formats: CD
(truth) EP	Released: 2009; Label: Suburban Noize; Formats: Digital download
Sandmine	Released: 2021; Label: Suburban Noize; Format: CD, Digital download
Last Ones Standing (with Dropout Kings)	Released: 2022; Label: Suburban Noize; Format: CD, Digital download

== Singles ==
=== As lead artist ===
List of singles, with selected chart positions, showing year released and album name
Title	Year	Peak chart positions		Album
Title	Year	US Alt.	US Main. Rock	Album
"Ground"	1997	—	—	(hed) pe
"Darky"	1997	—	—	(hed) pe
"Serpent Boy"	1998	—	—	(hed) pe
"Bartender"	2000	27	23	Broke
"Killing Time"	2001	—	—	Broke
"The Meadow (Special Like You)"	2001	—	—	Broke
"Blackout"	2003	32	21	Blackout
"Other Side"	2003	—	40	Blackout
"Represent"	2005	—	—	Only in Amerika
"Beware Do We Go"	2006	—	—	Back 2 Base X
"Suffa"	2007	—	—	Insomnia
"Here and Now"	2009	—	—	New World Orphans
"No Rest 4 da Wicked"	2010	—	—	Major Pain 2 Indee Freedom: The Best of Hed P.E.
"Stand Up" (featuring Lajon Witherspoon)	2010	—	—	Truth Rising
"First Blood"	2020	—	—	Class of 2020
"Death Awaits"	2020	—	—	Class of 2020
"Sandmine"	2021	—	—	Sandmine
"Not Today" (featuring The Final Clause of Tacitus)	2021	—	—	Califas Worldwide
"Choose Sides" (featuring Mr Talkative)	2022	—	—	Califas Worldwide
"Bartenders" (featuring Dropout Kings & DJ Lethal)	2022	—	—	Last Ones Standing
"Wind Me Up" (Remastered 2022; featuring Kottonmouth Kings & Tech N9ne)	2022	—	—	Insomnia
"Let's Ride" (featuring Madchild)	2022	—	—	non-album single
"Renegade" (Remastered 2022)	2023	—	—	New World Orphans
"I Wanna Be Sedated"	2023	—	—	70's Hits from the Pit
"Detox"	2023	—	—	Detox
"—" denotes a recording that did not chart or was not released in that territory.

=== As featured artist ===
List of singles, showing year released and album name
Title	Year	Album
"Doomsday Paradise" (Jahred featuring Hed PE)	2012	Unite
"Stripclub Pornstars" (SSB featuring Hed PE)	2016	More Stories to Tell
"Bleed for This P.E. & Nikki Smalls" (Scarecrow Hill featuring Hed PE & Nikki Smalls)	2021	Never Say Die
"We Want It All" (King Klick, Hed PE, Madchild, Johnny Richter, Obnoxious, Chucky Chuck)	2021	King Klick
"Everyday" (Whitney Peyton, King Klick, Hed PE, Dropout Kings)	2021	King Klick
"Out the Way" (Wes Anderson featuring UNKSTA & Hed PE)	2021	King Klick
"GlitchGang Remix" (Dropout Kings, Hed PE, Crazy Town, Twiztid)	2022	Last Ones Standing
"Temptation" (ABiCA featuring Hed PE)	2023	13
"Puzzle Piece" (DOC featuring Hed PE)	2023	13

== Other charted songs ==
List of singles, with selected chart positions, showing year released and album name
Title	Year	Peak chart positions	Album
Title	Year	US Main. Rock	Album
"Renegade"	2009	36	New World Orphans
"—" denotes a recording that did not chart or was not released in that territory.

== Music videos ==
List of music videos, showing year released and director
Title	Year	Director(s)
"Serpent Boy"	1996	Raul Cobb
"Ground"	1997	Ghetto Fabulous
"Bartender"	2000	Marc Klasfeld
"Killing Time"	2001	Demian Rami Lichteinstein
"The Meadow"	2001	Chizad
"Blackout"	2003	VEM & Tony
"Represent"	2005	Dale Resteghini
"Get Ready"	2006	Subnoize
"Suffa"	2007	Devin DeHaven
"Ordo (Ab Chao)"	2008	Devin DeHaven
"Renegade"	2008	Chad Archibald, Philip Carrer
"Here and Now"	2009	Dale Resteghini
"No Rest for the Wicked"	2010	Joey Nugent
"Truth Rising"	2011	Joey Nugent
"It's All Over"	2011	Joey Nugent
"Pay Me"	2016	Eric Richter
"Sandmine"	2021	Eitan Melody (EITANS DESIGNS)

== Other appearances ==
List of non-single guest appearances, showing year released and album name
Title	Year	Album
"Sabbra Cadabra"	2000	Nativity in Black II: A Tribute to Black Sabbath
"Waiting to Die"	2000	Tattoo the Earth: The First Crusade
"Swan Dive"	2000	Dracula 2000 soundtrack
"Crosstown Traffic"	2002	NASCAR on Fox: Crank It Up
"Weak Shitz Out"	2007	Independent's Day
