= Major Pain 2 Indee Freedom: The Best of Hed P.E. =

Greatest hits album by Hed PE
- Released: June 22, 2010
- Genre: Nu metal; rap metal; punk rock
- Label: Suburban Noize

Hed PE chronology
The Best of Hed Planet Earth (2006)	Major Pain 2 Indee Freedom: The Best of Hed P.E. (2010)

Major Pain 2 Indee Freedom: The Best of Hed P.E. is a retrospective compilation by Hed PE. It was released in 2010 on Suburban Noize Records, and is the first authorized compilation of material by the band.

== Music ==
Major Pain 2 Indee Freedom focuses primarily on the band's recordings under Suburban Noize Records, with four tracks from earlier albums recorded for Jive Records. Jive had previously issued the compilation The Best of Hed Planet Earth without the band's involvement. The music of Major Pain 2 Indee Freedom incorporates elements of styles ranging from hip hop and reggae to punk rock, hardcore punk and heavy metal. The new song "No Rest 4 da Wicked" was recorded especially for this album, and features a chorous reminiscent of The Police. The band purchased new recording material for the song, which premiered on Noisecreep.

== Reviews ==
Professional ratings
Review scores
Source	Rating
Allmusic	3.5/5 stars
Kik Axe Music	4/5 stars

Allmusic wrote "While not a perfectly well-rounded retrospective, Major Pain 2 Indee Freedom: The Best of Hed P.E. does a good job summarizing (hed) p.e.’s recordings for Suburban Noize". Kik Axe Music called the retrospective "a love letter to longtime listeners [that] just might bring some new ones into the fold as well."

== Track listing ==
No.	Title	Original release	Length
1.	"Firsty"	Hed PE	2:26
2.	"Bartender"	Broke	3:59
3.	"Killing Time"	Broke	3:54
4.	"Blackout"	Blackout	3:48
5.	"Represent"	Only in Amerika	4:20
6.	"Sophia"	Back 2 Base X	3:19
7.	"Let's Ride"	Back 2 Base X	4:05
8.	"Peer Pressure"	Back 2 Base X	0:44
9.	"Novus Ordos Clitorus"	Back 2 Base X	3:13
10.	"Suffa"	Insomnia	2:57
11.	"Comeova2nite"	Insomnia	4:19
12.	"Wind Me Up"	Insomnia	5:11
13.	"Madhouse"	Insomnia	2:03
14.	"Renegade"	New World Orphans	3:29
15.	"Here and Now"	New World Orphans	3:36
16.	"Stay Ready"	New World Orphans	4:15
17.	"Ordo (Ab Chao)"	New World Orphans	2:43
18.	"No Rest 4 Da Wicked"	Major Pain 2 Indee Freedom: The Best of Hed P.E.	3:24

iTunes bonus tracks
No.	Title	Length
1.	"Game Over" (live)	1:42
2.	"R.T.O." (live)	3:40
3.	"Let's Ride" (live)	4:30
4.	"Sophia" (live)	3:42
5.	"Madhouse" (live)	2:04
6.	"Novus Ordos Clitorus" (live)	1:10
7.	"Peer Pressure" (live)	1:25
8.	"Renegade" (live)	3:25
9.	"Live or Die Free" (live)	2:49
10.	"Work on This" (featuring Tech N9ne)	4:25
11.	"Babylon Fall"	3:32
12.	"Born2Ride" (Big B)	3:26
13.	"Girlfriend"	4:30
14.	"Cities on the Moon"	2:29
15.	"Hey Now"	2:59
16.	"Don't Fuck with Us"	2:07

- Most of the live tracks are from the limited bonus DVD that came with the album. The studio tracks are all the bonus tracks (except one, "Bucky Lasek") from New World Orphans.
