= Devin Lebsack =

American drummer

Devin "The Sack" Lebsack
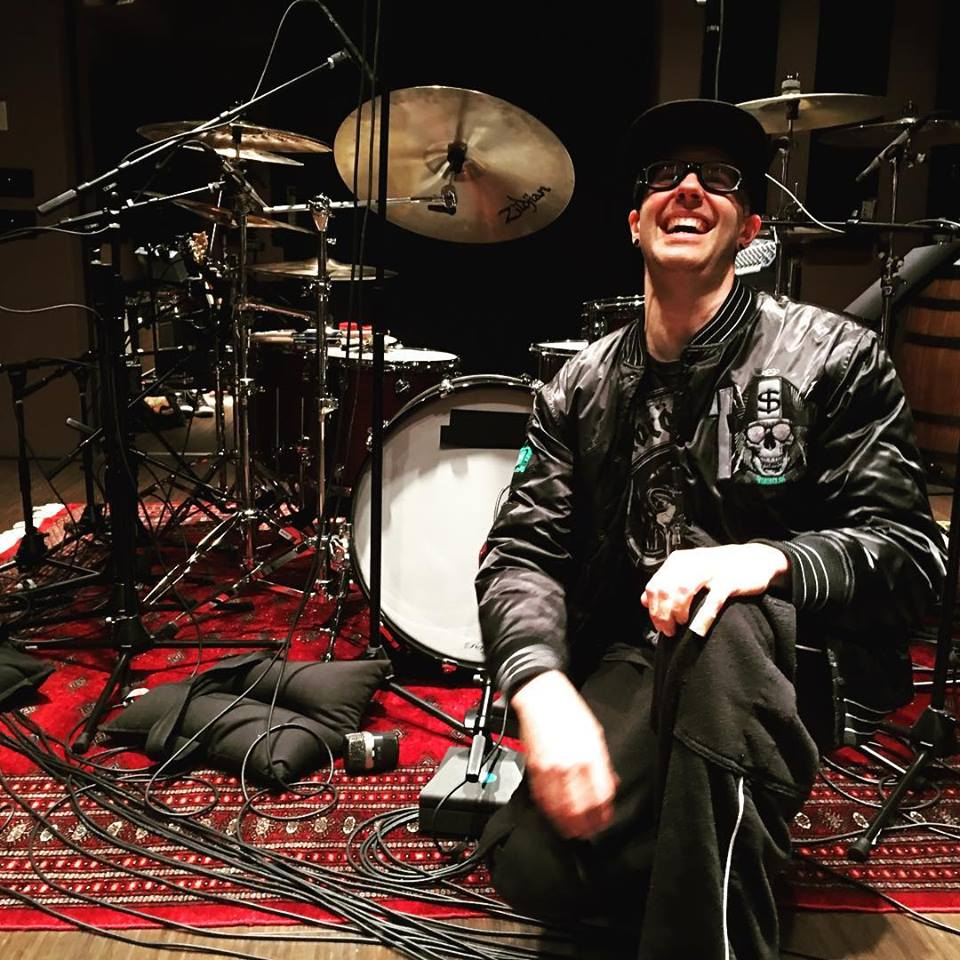
- Devin Lebsack in 2016

Background information
- Birth name: Devin Aaron Lebsack
- Origin: Greeley, Colorado, United States
- Genres: Heavy metal; rock
- Years active: 1999–Present
- Website: devinlebsack.com

Devin Lebsack is an American drummer based in Los Angeles, California.

== Career ==
Lebsack moved to Los Angeles after graduating with a Bachelor's in Professional Music from Berklee College of Music in 2001. As a co-founding member of the progressive rock band Velveteen, he recorded their first record "Brothers in Arms", but left shortly afterwards to begin work as a freelance musician.

His first break came with the band (həd) p.e. in 2006. He joined the band for the Back 2 Base X world tour, and also recorded Insomnia, their second release on Suburban Noize Records.

During his tenure with (həd) p.e., he also appeared on Make It a Double for label mates Mower, as well as OPM's Golden State of Mind.

While touring in Europe with (həd) p.e., Lebsack became friends with Charles Kallaghan Massabo, singer of the French band Sikh. The two would later go on to be members of the bands Overly Green, Censura! and Supermanic. During this time, Lebsack met producer Andrew Murdock, who hired him for the recording of Blood of my Enemies, the debut album from Evan Seinfeld's band Attika 7.

As a brief member of Attika 7, Devin appeared on the Discovery Channel TV show, “Devils Ride”.

More recently, Lebsack has recorded and toured with a range of artists, including Redlight King, White Wizzard and Voodoo KungFu. His latest work is with producer Ben Grosse on Voodoo KungFu's first U.S. release, Celestial Burial.

== Credits ==
Year	Artist	Album	Contribution
2007	(hed)p.e.	Insomnia	Drums
2008	Mower	Make it a Double	Drums
2012	Attika 7	Blood of my Enemies	Drums
2013	White Wizzard	Marathon of Dreams	Drums

== Equipment ==
- Evans
- Vater
