= Wesley Geer =

American guitarist

- Also known as: Wesstyle, Wes Geer
- Born: Wesley Harmon Geer, Jr. October 28, 1974 (age 51); Fullerton, California, U.S.
- Occupation: Guitarist
- Years active: 1992–present
- Formerly of: Hed PE
- Website: wesgeer.com

Wesley Harmon Geer Jr. (born October 28, 1974), also known as Wesstyle, is an American guitarist, best known as a founding member of the rock/rap/crossover band Hed PE, formed in 1994 in Huntington Beach, California. He was a guitarist, songwriter and producer in the band until his departure in 2003. Geer also toured with nu metal bands Korn and Papa Roach.

== Biography ==
Geer was born in Fullerton, California. He met rapper and singer Jared Gomes, while attending local music shows in Orange County, California during the 1990s. Together they formed the band Hed PE.

Hed PE was signed by Jive Records, and toured with bands like Deftones, System of a Down, and Korn. Chester Bennington (Linkin Park frontman) said this about Hed PE.: "they deserve worldwide recognition. They're a great live act, they make good albums, and they're awesome. They're not an easy act to open for or follow."

Geer left the band in 2003, to adopt a different lifestyle, and took a job with Fusion Academy & Learning Center to teach music to children in grades 6–12.

In 2010, Geer joined Korn. He knew guitar player James "Munky" Shaffer since 1994. After lead guitar player Brian "Head" Welch left the band in 2005, Korn reached out to Geer; he toured and performed live as a guitar player for Korn since 2010, until 2013, when Welch returned to the band.

Geer founded the band HU3M3N in 2021 with Clinton Calton, Matt Bartosch, and Scott Underwood from Train, who was later replaced by Zac Morris on drums.

Wes Geer has performed on stage with artists like Papa Roach (Jimmy Kimmel, 2006) Bob Schneider (Rock to Recovery Austin, 2019), Moby (Rock to Recovery 3, 2018), Shavo from System of a Down (Rock to Recovery 4, 2019), Monte Pittman, musician for Madonna and Ministry (Rock to Recovery 5, 2022), Acey Slade from The Misfits (Rock to Recovery 5, 2022), and Scott Underwood and Charlie Colin from Train (Rock to Recovery Ten Year Anniversary, 2022). Geer also does public speaking about addiction, mental health and transformations.

In 2023, Geer co-founded BandJAM, a company that provides live, guided group music sessions for corporate wellness, mental health treatment, and senior care settings, in partnership with Rock to Recovery.

== Discography ==
=== Hed P.E. ===
- Church of Realities (1995)
- Hed PE (1997)
- Broke (2000)
- Blackout (2003)
- The Best of (həd) Planet Earth (2006)

=== Korn ===
- Digital EP #3 (2010)
- The Path of Totality Tour – Live at the Hollywood Palladium (2012)

== Other musical credits (with Hed PE) ==
- The Replacement Killers (1998) — "33"
- Strangeland (1998) — "Serpent Boy (Radio Edit)"
- Nativity in Black II (2000) — "Sabbra Cadabra"
- Dracula 2000 (2000) — "Swan Dive"
- "Circus" was a song included in the soundtrack for EA Sports Jeremy McGrath Supercross 2000.
- Crazy/Beautiful (2001) — "Killing Time"
- Tomcats (2001) – "Bartender"
- 3000 Miles to Graceland (2001) — "Killing Time"
- NASCAR: Crank It Up (2002) — "Crosstown Traffic"
- Final Destination 2 (2003) — "I Got You"
- "Suck It Up" was a song included in the soundtrack for EA Sports Madden NFL 2003.
- "Blackout" was a song included in the soundtrack for EA Sports MVP Baseball 2003.
- "Get Away" was a song included in the soundtrack for NASCAR Thunder 2003.
- Final Destination 3 (2006) — "Killing Time"
