= AI Freaks Me Out =

Single by Double Experience

from the album Rock (Geology)
- Released: February 12, 2018
- Recorded: October 2017
- Studio: Warrior Sound Studios, Chapel Hill, NC
- Genre: Nerd rockl, hard rock
- Length: 3:34
- Label: Colfax Rock
- Songwriters: Brock Tinsley, Ian Nichols
- Producer: Double Experience

Double Experience singles chronology
"The Pilot" (2017)	"AI Freaks Me Out" (2018)	"Oh Listener Mine" (2018)

"AI Freaks Me Out" is the second single from Double Experience's third studio album Rock (Geology), officially released on February 12, 2018, along with a music video, on March 22, 2018.

== Background ==
On January 22, 2018, Double Experience’s Twitter announced their single and its release date, noting that artificial intelligence was “pushing humanity to the edge of a cliff and staring blankly”. The band released “AI Freaks Me Out” during their European tour with Hed PE and Conveyer.

== Music video ==
On February 11, 2018, Double Experience released a video on their Facebook, featuring Ian Nichols as Max Headroom. A month later, on March 22, the video premiered on the Spaceuntravel YouTube, for worldwide audiences.

== Live performances ==
The band performed the song live for the first time on March 2, 2018 at a sold-out show in Ottawa, Ontario. To celebrate, Double Experience procured robot-themed cocktails and loot crates for the attendants. A dollar from each ticket was donated to Ingenium.

== Track listing ==
Digital download
No.	Title	Length
1.	"AI Freaks Me Out"	3:30

== Release history ==
Country	Date	Format	Label	Ref.
Worldwide	February 12, 2018	Airplay	Colfax Rock	
Global	February 12, 2018	Digital download	Colfax Rock	
