= The D.I.Y. Guys =

D.I.Y. Guys

Live album by (həd)p.e.
- Released: July 28, 2008
- Genre: Nu metal; rap metal; punk rock
- Length: 33:30
- Label: Suburban Noize

The D.I.Y. Guys is the first live album by American rock band Hed PE, released on July 8, 2008. The live CD portion of the presentation was captured at Hollywood's legendary Key Club during their Insomnia tour. The CD portion also contains "Niteclub In Bali", a B-side off their Back 2 Base X album as well as "Get Em Up", a track featuring the Subnoize Souljaz, and a new hardcore punk song called "Killing Spree". Three other new tracks, "War On The Middle Class", "Ordo AB Chao", and "Bloodfire" were featured on New World Orphans.

The DVD portion of the set, showcases the band in a behind-the-scenes look at everyday life. It features skit-like performances of the band dealing with problems in their everyday tour life. The mockumentary, however, is scripted and is just meant for entertainment. The DVD portion also contains live footage of songs that are featured on the live CD portion of the set. The D.I.Y. Guys also contains three music videos that include, "Represent" from Only in Amerika, "Get Ready" from Back 2 Base X and "Suffa" from Insomnia.

Weeks before the album's release date, "Ordo AB Chao" appeared on the band's MySpace, which was revamped in order to promote the album. Starting two days prior to the release of the album, the band embarked on the D.I.Y. tour which featured other Suburban Noize Records artists such as OPM, Dirtball and Potluck in order to promote the album's release.

== Track listing ==
No.	Title	Length
1.	"Madhouse"	2:05
2.	"Not Dead Yet"	0:37
3.	"Game Over"	1:39
4.	"Peer Pressure"	0:45
5.	"Sophia"	3:34
6.	"The Truth"	3:12
7.	"RTO"	3:43
8.	"Niteclub In Bali"	2:11
9.	"Get Em Up"	4:28
10.	"War On The Middle Class"	2:04
11.	"Ordo (ab Chao)"	2:43
12.	"Bloodfire"	2:47
13.	"Real Talk"	1:34
14.	"Killing Spree"	2:09
