= Double Experience =

Canadian rock band

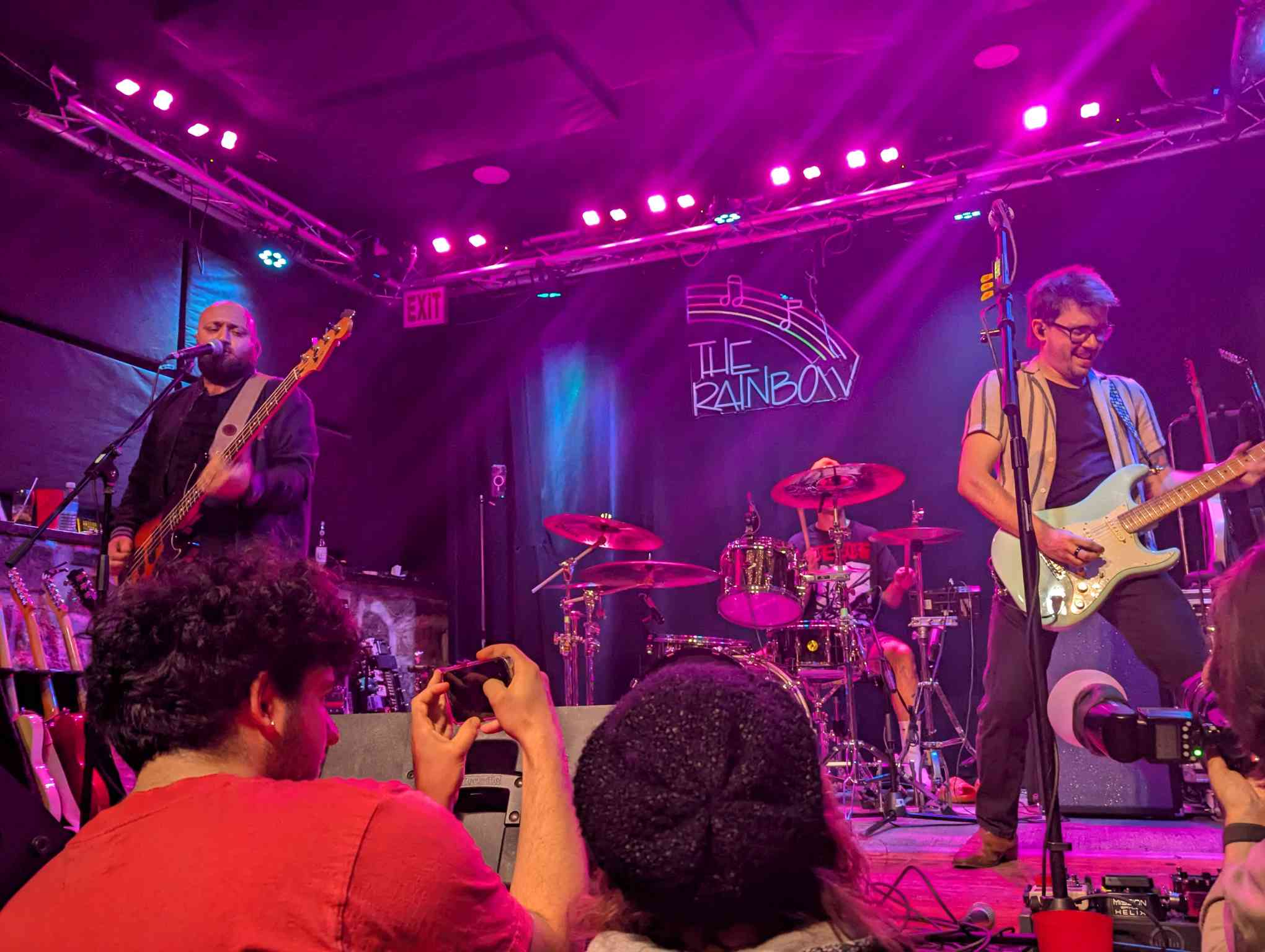
- Canadian band Double Experience (L-R, Ian Nichols, Brock Tinsley) performing onstage at The Rainbow in Ottawa, Ontario.

Background information
- Origin: Ottawa, Ontario, Canada
- Genres: Nerd rock, Alternative rock
- Years active: 2014–present
- Members: Ian Nichols; Brock Tinsley
- Website: www.2xExperience.com

Double Experience is a rock band based in Ottawa, Ontario that was formed in the summer of 2011. The band consists of vocalist and front man Ian Nichols and guitarist Brock Tinsley.

== History ==
=== Formation and beginnings ===
Double Experience's roots reach back into the late 2011 when guitarist Brock Tinsley and vocalist Ian Nichols began writing and performing together under the name Colfax.

In 2014, the name Double Experience was adopted by members Nichols, Tinsley, drummer Kenny Saunders and bassist Tim Kealey. While explaining the name change in an interview, the band claimed there were "as many legal implications appearing as there were bands with the name 'Colfax'."

=== 721835 (2014–2015) ===
In January 2014, Double Experience released the debut single, "Who the Hell?", consisting of footage the band had shot on their previous tours as Colfax.

In May 2014, Double Experience released advance physical copies of the album, complete with four additional tracks, as a tour exclusive.

721835 was released on August 1, 2014. In the same month, the band returned to the United Kingdom, eventually meeting and performing with Dafydd Cartwright. Tinsley stated that the tour was "not only the best of our three [tours] over here, but one of the best of our young careers so far."

=== Unsaved Progress (2015–2017) ===
In the months that followed, Double Experience continued to tour Canada and the UK in support of 721835. Some shows included performances inside video game stores and museums

The band returned to Warrior Sound studios in the fall of 2015. By this time, the band had performed over 500 shows across 16 countries. Nichols later noted that Unsaved Progress was "...the culmination of several years of touring, writing, working across the Atlantic Ocean" and "took a tremendous amount of planning, effort, and perseverance."

On February 18, 2016, Double Experience debuted the album's first single, "So Fine".

In the fall of 2016, Double Experience embarked on "The Lure Tour", which was themed around the mobile game Pokémon GO, utilizing outfits and physical recreations of in-game items such as a Poke-stop.

On February 1, 2017, Double Experience released their music video for "Godzilla".

=== Rock (Geology) (2017–2019) ===
After the release of Unsaved Progress, Nichols and Tinsley briefly toured in a tribute band of The Police.

During the summer of 2017, Double Experience were involved in the inaugural Nerdstock music festival via Montreal Comiccon, joining the Ned Flanders-centric metal band Okilly Dokilly.

On November 9, 2017, Double Experience released "The Pilot", their first single since Unsaved Progress.

On December 8, Double Experience announced a support tour of Europe and the United Kingdom with Hed PE and Conveyer. During this tour, the band revealed their next single for Rock (Geology), "AI Freaks Me Out", which was subsequently released on February 12, 2018. To celebrate the release of the single, Double Experience aligned with Ingenium for an event "to raise funds for science, technology, engineering, arts, and math learning programs" at the Canada Science and Technology Museum in their hometown of Ottawa, Ontario.

By the end of 2018, Double Experience signed with Drakkar Entertainment.

On March 1, 2019, Double Experience released their first single through Drakkar Entertainment, "Love is Not Just Talk".

During the month of May, Double Experience joined Danko Jones on their Ontario tour dates.

=== Alignments (2019–2024) ===
On Nov 1, 2019, Double Experience announced Alignments; a trilogy of EPs released in November, January and March, culminating in a full-length album on April 24, 2020. Alignments would be the first Double Experience release distributed by Drakkar Entertainment and Soulfood.

On March 27, 2020, Bloody Disgusting debuted the music video for "Your Biggest Fan". The video was an homage to the film adaptation of Misery. Alignments was released on Friday April 24, 2020..

On April 28, 2021, Double Experience received two Capital Music Awards nominations for "Group of the Year" and "Album of the Year".

=== Undefeated (2024–present) ===
For nearly 5 years, the band delivered songwriting workshops at comic conventions and colleges, relying on live input from audience members. In May 2024, Double Experience released their crowdfunded album Undefeated. The album was created via a series of live stream sessions on their Twitch channel. Undefeated was awarded "Album of the Year" at the 2025 Capital Music Awards, hosted at the National Arts Centre.

On October 29, 2025, Double Experience announced a live album recorded in the Diefenbunker, a large underground four-storey reinforced concrete bunker and nuclear fallout shelter outside of Ottawa.

Double Experience were featured in the official announcement for Porao do Rock 2026, marking their debut appearance in Brazil and in South America.

In November 2026, Double Experience helped organize the first Ottawa edition of Indie Week, a music festival and industry conference previously held in Toronto. Having performed at the event in previous years, the band advocated for Ottawa's ByWard Market as a suitable location for its multi-venue format.

== Band members ==
Current members

- Ian Nichols - vocals, bass
- Brock Tinsley - guitars

Former members

- Kenny Saunders - drums (2014)
- Tim Kealey - bass (2014)
- Dafydd Cartwright - drums (2016–2017)

Timeline

== Discography ==
Studio albums

- 2014: 721835
- 2016: Unsaved Progress
- 2017: Rock (Geology)
- 2020: Alignments
- 2024: Undefeated

Music videos

- 2014: "Who the Hell?"
- 2016: "So Fine"
- 2017: "Godzilla"
- 2017: "The Pilot"
- 2018: "AI Freaks Me Out"
- 2019: "New Me"
