= 721835 =

Studio album by Double Experience
- Released: August 1, 2014
- Recorded: 2013, at Warrior Sound Studio, Chapel Hill, North Carolina
- Genres: Hard rock, alternative rock
- Label: Independent
- Producers: Al Jacob, Mitch Marlow

Double Experience chronology
One Big Quicksand (2011)	721835 (2014)	Unsaved Progress (2016)

721835 is the second full-length album by Double Experience, released worldwide on August 1, 2014. It is their first album released independently via their record label Colfax Rock.

According to a blog post by the band, the album title is leet for the word "tribes" and is not intended to be pronounced numerically.

== Track listing ==
1. Gambit (3:57)
2. Strange Acquaintance (4:41)
3. Horror Beyond Imagination (3:34)
4. Wolf in the Ewe (4:19)
5. Congratulations on Second Place (3:28)
6. Here's Y (2:39)
7. Thumbsucker (3:30)
8. Destiny Chile (3:39)
9. Who the Hell? (3:05)

== Miscellaneous ==
- Steve Bache (longtime drummer of North Carolinian rock band He Is Legend) filled in on drums for the first recording sessions of 721835 from December 27 to 29.
- Many of the lyrics and titles found on the album contain allusions to movies, video games and other assorted pop culture. "Horror Beyond Imagination" takes its title from the tagline to the fictitious Lucasfilm movie Blue Harvest. According to Tinsley, "Horror Beyond Imagination" was inspired by various articles about people who became "depressed and even suicidal" when faced with the fact they could not ever visit their favorite movie settings.
- The title for "Strange Acquaintance" is derived from a cocktail of the same name served at The Lantern, a restaurant in Chapel Hill. The band would frequent the bar after recording sessions.
- According to Tinsley, 721835 was originally going to be a concept album about a space adventurer on a planet of cyborgs as a metaphor for "rock music vs. electronic music" but lacked the foresight to successfully incorporate into the entire album.

== Critical reception ==
Upon its release, 721835 received positive reviews. Royal Flush praised the record, noting that "the song writing is impeccable" and felt songs like "Who the Hell" "demonstrate Ian's amazing vocals and ability to carry the melody throughout the entire track." ModularBase echoed these sentiments, adding that the lyrics were "considerably well-written" throughout. Lærke Fenger of Rockfreaks.net gave 721835 a 7.5/10, calling it a collection of "ballsy, well-written alternative rock songs with cheeky riffs and ambitious vocal melodies". Though she recognized the range of sounds covered on the album, she ultimately concluded that "the best songs are still the ones that make the most use of the gritty rock 'n' roll approach they have perfected so well."

== Personnel ==
Ian Nichols – vocals, lyrics
Brock Tinsley – guitars, lyrics
Tim Kealey – bass, synths
Steve Bache – drums (tracks 1–5)
Kenny Saunders – drums (tracks 7–9)
Al Jacob – production, engineer
Mitchell Marlow – co-production, additional instrumentation
Jamie King – Mastering
Dieter V.D.O – cover artwork
