= Evolution (Hed PE album) =

Studio album by (Hed) Planet Earth
- Released: July 22, 2014
- Recorded: Filthy Hands Studio
- Length: 52:24
- Label: Pavement
- Producer: MCUD

Hed PE chronology
Truth Rising (2010)	Evolution (2014)	Forever! (2016)

Evolution is the ninth studio album by Hed PE, released through Pavement Music. It marks the last appearance of Mawk and Jaxon.

== Track listing ==
No.	Title	Length
1.	"No Turning Back"	5:26
2.	"Lost in Babylon"	4:39
3.	"Jump The Fence"	5:07
4.	"Too Many Games"	4:24
5.	"No Tomorrow"	3:22
6.	"Let It Rain"	4:14
7.	"One More Body"	4:03
8.	"Never Alone"	3:30
9.	"The Higher Crown"	1:40
10.	"Nowhere 2 Go"	5:41
11.	"Let It Burn"	5:23
12.	"Hold On"	4:55

== Personnel ==
(Hed) Planet Earth

- Jahred (Jared Gomes) – vocals
- Jaxon (Jaxon Benge) – guitars
- Mawk (Mark Young) – bass
- Trauma (Jeremiah Stratton) – drums

Production

- Jahred Gomes – production, engineering
- Ulrich Wild – mixing
- Maor Appelbaum – mastering
