= Anthony "Tiny" Biuso =

American drummer

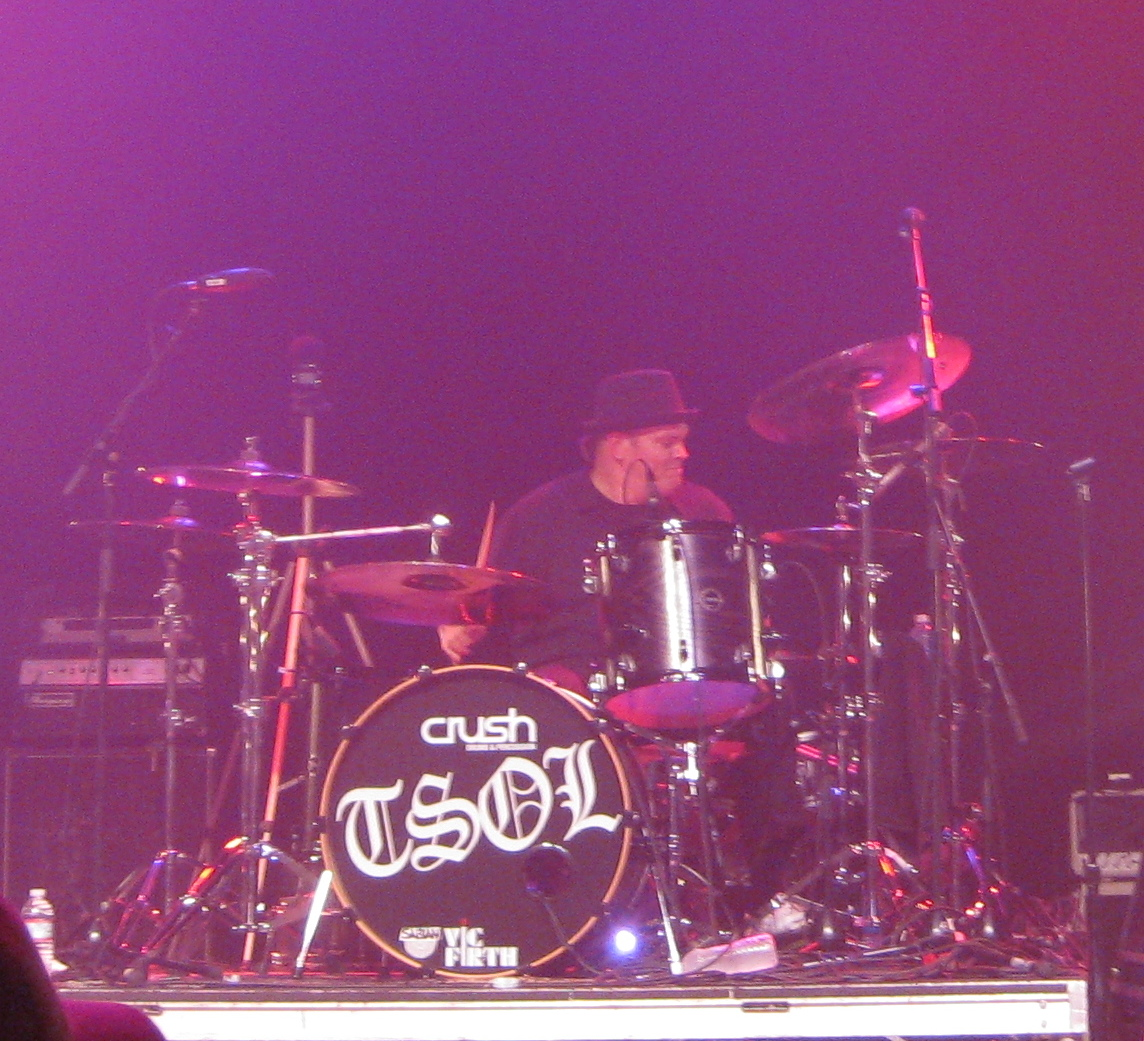
- Biuso playing drums with T.S.O.L. at GV30 in 2011

Background information
- Birth name: Anthony Peter Biuso
- Also known as: Tiny Bubz
- Born: August 19, 1970 (age 54); Queens, New York City, U.S.
- Genres: Hardcore punk; heavy metal; punk rock
- Occupation(s): Musician, composer
- Instrument: Drums
- Years active: 1988–present

Anthony "Tiny Bubz" Biuso (born August 19, 1970) is an American musician, best known for playing drums in the punk bands T.S.O.L., The Dickies, and Hed PE.

He has collaborated with many bands and artists including MC Ren of N.W.A, Lindsey Troy, former Megadeth drummer Nick Menza, Dizzy Reed of Guns N' Roses, composer Rick Torres, SIN 34 guitarist Anthony Gallo, Chodle's Trunk, The Cadillac Tramps, Rude Awakening, The Ooks of Hazard, The Spider Accomplice, Bad Xample, Gina Schock of The Go-Go's, Cliff Dorfman, The Sixes, Moby, Laura Dawn, Willie Basse, the metal band Black Sheep, and Rhino Bucket.

Buiso composes music and sound effects for film, television, and commercials. Biuso also hosts several online shows for Sullen TV and drum-line.net.

== Early life ==
Born Anthony Peter Biuso in Queens, New York City, on August 19, 1970, Biuso attended a Catholic elementary school in Long Island. Biuso lists his hometown as Wantagh, New York. As a child, he studied jazz and dixieland. In high school he was a member of the marching band. He was asked to join the Long Island Youth Orchestra as a snare and tympani player when he was a senior in high school.

Biuso's biggest influences are Led Zeppelin's John Bonham, Billy Joel's Liberty DeVitto and Kiss's Peter Criss. In an interview he said "I can remember seeing Kiss in 1980 and coming home crying because I wanted to be Peter Criss so badly."

In 1988, after studying music and percussion at the Long Island Drum Center he decided to move to Southern California to pursue his dream of becoming a rock star. He met many like minded musicians in Los Angeles and enrolled at the Musicians Institute where he earned the nickname "Tiny Bubz".

== Career ==
After spending six months at the Musicians Institute, Biuso joined the hardcore and thrash group Rude Awakening in 1988. In 1991 he left Rude Awakening for the soulful hard rock act Bad Xample. Biuso recorded an album with the band at Sound City Studios in Los Angeles in early 1992 with producer Greg Fidelman. After that he joined the group Full Metal Racket, who made a brief appearance on the 1998 Warped Tour. Biuso toured Europe with Rude Awakening in 1998 and 1999. He also recorded albums for MC Ren (from N.W.A.), Lindsey Troy ( from Elektra), and Popa. In 2002 he collaborated with former Megadeth drummer Nick Menza on Menza's first solo record Life After Deth; Biuso wrote the song "Life Back" for the album. Biuso was hired in 2003 by the punk band The Dickies for several US tours. He joined punk band T.S.O.L. in 2004. Biuso play drums at the Cat Club in Los Angeles. In 2007, Biuso was asked to join the band Hed PE to tour and record an album—New World Orphans was released on January 13, 2009, and hit number 73 on the Billboard charts.

Biuso left Hed PE in August 2008 to devote more time to his main group T.S.O.L. The band won the 2009 Best So Cal Punk Band award given by the OC Weekly Music Awards. They recorded two full-length albums, Who's Screwin' Who and Life, Liberty & the Pursuit of Free Downloads. In 2010 he was asked to play on Rhino Bucket's album Who's Got Mine. Biuso also writes for the magazine Modern Drummer and as of 2013 still plays and records with T.S.O.L.

Biuso was chosen to fill-in for the band Doyle on August 13, 2014, for their first US tour after original drummer Dr. Chud dropped out. In 2015 Biuso played on Doyle's summer tour of the US.

Biuso has composed music and sound effects with his longtime friend, composer, and songwriter, Rick Torres.

Biuso is mentioned in the book Sticks And Skins by Jules Follet.

Biuso's has worked as session musician for Dizzy Reed, a current and original member of Guns N' Roses.

== Endorsements ==
Biuso endorses Crush Drums, Danmar, Sabian, Evans drumheads, Promark Sticks, Brixton, and Vector Bass drum pedals.

== Discography ==
Title	Release	Label	Band
Life After Death	2002	Menzanator	Nick Menza
New World Orphans	2009	Suburban Noize	Hed PE
Who's Screwin' Who?	2005	Cleopatra Records	T.S.O.L.
Live from Long Beach	2007	Cider City Records	T.S.O.L.
Life, Liberty & the Pursuit of Free Downloads	2009	Hurley International	T.S.O.L.
Who's Got Mine?	2010	Acetate Records	Rhino Bucket
