= Unsaved Progress =

Studio album by Double Experience
- Released: April 8, 2016
- Recorded: 2015, at Warrior Sound Studio, Chapel Hill, North Carolina; Additional recording at Orange Sound, Penmaenmawr, Wales
- Genre: Hard rock, nerd rock
- Length: 30:24
- Label: Colfax Music
- Producer: Al Jacob, Double Experience

Double Experience chronology
721835 (2014)	Unsaved Progress (2016)	Alignments (2020)

Unsaved Progress is Double Experience's third full-length album, released worldwide on April 8, 2016.

According to an interview with vocalist Ian Nichols, the album title was derived from a common video game warning message where the players quit the game without saving.

== Composition and influences ==
The album's style has been described as alternative rock and hard rock, with comparisons made to Fall Out Boy and Queens of the Stone Age. The Police and He is Legend have been specifically mentioned as an inspiration by Nichols.

Shortly after the release of Unsaved Progress, Double Experience released a formal cover of Buddy Holly (song). Tinsley stated that Weezer "proved that rock and roll doesn't have to act or sound a specific way. That's the essence of our band."

Double Experience also drew inspiration from video games. In an interview with 92.1 Rock, Tinsley inadvertently credited Mick Gordon as an inspiration for Double Experience, praising the Doom soundtrack due to its uniqueness compared with normal video game soundtracks.

== Track listing ==
No.	Title	Length
1.	"So Fine"	3:19
2.	"AAA"	3:17
3.	"The Glimmer Shot"	3:23
4.	"See You Soon"	2:57
5.	"Impasse"	3:44
6.	"Exposure Exposure"	2:54
7.	"Death of Lucidity"	3:17
8.	"Godzilla" (Blue Öyster Cult cover)	3:57
9.	"Weakened Warriors"	3:33
Total length:		30:21

== Miscellaneous ==
- The title for “So Fine” was created using abbreviations for the five chemical elements sulphur, oxygen, fluorine, iodine and neon. Additionally, each line of the chorus represents the properties of each chemical
- Lyrics from ”The Glimmer Shot” were inspired by the video game Destiny. When Bungie, the developers of Destiny, heard the song, they awarded the band unique in-game rewards as well as accolades in their weekly blog.
- The album features a cover of "Godzilla" by Blue Öyster Cult. The official video for the song took the band 3 months of production and was released on February 1, 2017.

== Personnel ==
Ian Nichols – vocals, lyrics
Brock Tinsley – guitars, bass, lyrics
Dafydd Cartwright – drums
Al Jacob – production, lead engineer
Kit Walters – Mixing
Jamie King – Mastering
Russ Hayes, Chris Walker – drum engineering
Matteo Cuccato – artwork
Buck Dharma – lyrics, composter on Track 7

== Critical reception ==
Upon its release, Unsaved Progress received positive reviews. Calum Slingerland of Exclaim! noted that Double Experience "check[s] all the boxes of a modern-rock smash". David Navarro of Slicker Magazine praised the album, labeling the music as a mix of "Fall Out Boy, Queens of the Stone Age and even a little Coheed and Cambria, all while still maintaining an aesthetic that feels wholly unique perhaps entirely due to their lyrical subject matter." Alberto Centenary of Italy's Metal Eyes Magazine rated the album an 8/10, deeming the album as "a collection of hits" and specifically commended "...the good guitar performance of Tinsley, a melodic war machine in solos and a [powerhouse] in hard rock riffs."

Critique de Salon reviewer Olivier Dénommée rated the album 7.5/10 as felt that the album's style was "well put-together" and "would please nerds who want to rock... even if the band will never write something as epic as actual video game music".

Unsaved Progress reached #6 on the National Loud Chart in Canada.
