= Truth Rising =

Studio album by (hed) ^{p.e.}
- Released: October 26, 2010
- Recorded: Trackhouse Studios, Orange County, CA; Greensprings Studios, Orange County, CA
- Length: 59:10
- Labels: Suburban Noize; Shock
- Producers: Jahred Gomes; Kevin Zinger; Brad Xavier

Hed PE chronology
New World Orphans (2009)	Truth Rising (2010)	Evolution (2014)

Singles from Truth Rising
- 1. "No Rest for the Wicked" Released: 2010

Truth Rising is the eighth studio album by American rock band Hed PE. Released on October 26, 2010, the album received mixed reviews and debuted at #98 on the Billboard 200. The album also peaked #13 on the Top Independent albums charts.

== Music and lyrics ==
The music of Truth Rising primarily fuses hard rock, heavy metal, hip hop, funk, reggae and punk rock. Jared Gomes' vocal style ranges from melodic singing to rapping and death growls. The album continues the band's increasingly political lyrical message, drawing thematic material from the 9/11 Truth movement. Religion and sex are also discussed. Gomes states that the "truth" referred to in the album's title refers to "a lot of different things. One of it is trying to sift through all the political catch phrases and junk. There's also the organized religion component, there's the E.T. reality component and then there's blind consumerism. It's a broad concept."

"No Rest for the Wicked" was recorded especially for the compilation Major Pain 2 Indee Freedom: The Best of Hed P.E., and features a chorous reminiscent of The Police. The band purchased new recording material for the song, which premiered on Noisecreep. Sevendust singer Lajon Witherspoon contributed guest vocals to the song "Stand Up". Gomes described "Takeover" as a battle rap; he also stated that the lyrical themes were lighter than the rest of the album.

== Music videos ==
The video for "It's All Over" was presented in September 2011 as a plasticine animation. It shows the members of the band being made of plasticine and driving their car. It also has scenes in some house with Hed PE musicians binding a girl with ropes and killing a man with an angle grinder. Closer to the end it shows a battle between Jahred's character and some beast with a sword.

== Reviews ==
Professional ratings
Review scores
Source	Rating
411mania	(6.5/10)
AbsolutePunk	80%
Allmusic	2/5 stars
Kik Axe Music	3/5 stars
Metal Underground	2/5 stars
The New Review	2.5/5 stars
OC Reloaded	(favourable)

411mania gave the album a 6.5 rating, describing parts of the album as "disjointed"; the punk and hip hop tracks were deemed to be the weakest on the album. Allmusic wrote that "all the mishmashing makes Truth Rising even more inconsistent and alienating than usual." Kik Axe Music gave the album 3 out of 5, stating that the sexual references in the latter part of the album diminished the sincerity of the band's message. OC Reloaded wrote, "Despite the overly profane lyrics used in a few select songs, Truth Rising has a lot to offer. The general message Hed PE sends about getting involved in socio-political matters is an admirable one. Whether or not you agree with Hed PE's views, you should still get involved. Musically, Truth Rising contains enough variety to provide something to enjoy for everyone."

== Track listing ==
All tracks are written by Hed PE.

No.	Title	Length
1.	"Silence Is Betrayal (Intro)"	1:29
2.	"Truth Rising"	1:41
3.	"It's All Over"	3:42
4.	"The Capitalist Conspiracy (Intro)"	0:16
5.	"No Rest for the Wicked"	3:57
6.	"This Fire"	3:35
7.	"Takeover"	3:34
8.	"Stand Up" (feat. Lajon Witherspoon of Sevendust)	4:00
9.	"Beijo Na Boca (Intro)"	0:43
10.	"Menina"	2:49
11.	"Universal Peace (Intro)"	0:40
12.	"Forward Go!"	4:48
13.	"Bad News"	3:49
14.	"Deepthroat (Intro)"	1:22
15.	"Murder"	4:45
16.	"The Hed Honcho (Outro)"	1:10
17.	"Children of the Fall"	3:27
18.	"Enough Secrecy (Intro)"	0:26
19.	"No More Secrets"	4:49
20.	"Whitehouse"	1:16
21.	"We Are the Ones (Intro)"	0:15
22.	"It's Alright!"	6:39
Total length:		59:10

Skull & Bones Bonus CD
No.	Title	Length
1.	"Judgement Day (Exclusive)"	5:25
2.	"Takeover (feat. Axe Murder Boyz & Chucky Styles of DGAF)"	7:15
3.	"No More Secrets (Renegade Remix)"	10:31
4.	"The Love You Show (Exclusive)"	4:42
5.	"A Conversation with Jahred About the Truth Movement"	31:57
Total length:		59:50

== Personnel ==
(Hed) Planet Earth

- Jared Gomes — Vocals
- Jaxon Benge — Guitar
- DJ Product © 1969 — Turntables
- Mawk (Mark Young) — Bass
- Trauma — Drums

Production

- Produced by Jahred Gomes, Kevin Zinger & Brad Xavier
- Recorded by Lance Eichler & Rory Graham, @ Trackhouse Studios, Orange County, California
- Vocals recorded @ Greensprings Studios, Orange County, California
- Mixed by Jahred Gomes, @ Greensprings Studios, Orange County, California
- Mastered by Mike Lazer, @ Paramount Studios
- Management by Kevin Zinger & Ivory Daniel (The Regime)
- Layout & design by poabdesigns.com
- Art supervision by Jahred Gomes & poabdesigns.com
