= Alignments (album) =

Studio album by Double Experience
- Released: April 24, 2020
- Recorded: February 2019
- Studio: Warrior Sound Studios
- Genres: Hard rock, nerd rock
- Length: 34:00
- Labels: Drakkar Entertainment, Colfax Rock
- Producers: Al Jacob, Double Experience

Double Experience chronology
Unsaved Progress (2016)	Alignments (2020)

Alignments is Double Experience's third full-length album, released worldwide on April 24, 2020 via Drakkar Entertainment.

Alignments consisted of three three-song EPs - Alignments: Neutral, Alignments: Good and Alignments: Evil - which were released before the full-length album on Nov 1, 2019, Jan 2020, and March 13, 2020 respectively. The lead single “New Me”, was released from Alignments: Neutral on October 24, 2019.

== Track listing ==
No.	Title	Length
1.	"Perish Song"	3:20
2.	"New Me"	3:43
3.	"Something’s Got to Give"	3:02
4.	"Ghost in the Machine"	3:22
5.	"My List"	3:25
6.	"Your Biggest Fan"	3:42
7.	"Born for It"	3:06
8.	"So Dumb"	3:25
9.	"The Imp"	2:39
10.	"Alignments"	4:16
Total length:		34:00

== Personnel ==
Ian Nichols – vocals, bass, lyrics
Brock Tinsley – guitars, lyrics
Kail Carbon – drums
Al Jacob – production, mixing, lead engineer, additional instrumentation
Matt Tuttle – Mastering
Kidpixel – artwork

== Critical reception ==
Upon its release, Alignments received positive reviews. Katie Bird of Distorted Sound Magazine gave the album an 8/10, noting that “Double Experience [had] shown growth as they master progressive rock”.

On April 28, Alignments received a Capital Music Award nomination for "Album of the Year".
