= Broke (album) =

Studio album by (həd) Planet Earth
- Released: August 22, 2000
- Studios: Sweet Tea (Oxford, Mississippi); The Machine Shop (Hoboken, New Jersey); The Hit Factory (Miami, Florida)
- Genres: Nu metal; rap metal
- Length: 50:22
- Label: Jive
- Producer: Machine

Hed PE chronology
(həd)^{pe} (1997)	Broke (2000)	Blackout (2003)

Singles from Broke
- 1. "Bartender" Released: 2000; 2. "Killing Time" Released: 2001; 3. "The Meadow (Special Like You)" Released: 2001

Broke is the second studio album by American rock band Hed PE. Released on August 22, 2000, the album expanded the band's sound to incorporate classic rock and world music influences.

The album was a much greater success than the band's debut album, peaking at #63 on the US Billboard 200, while the album's lead single "Bartender" peaked at #23 on the Mainstream Rock. Broke sold 450,000 copies worldwide making it the most successful release by the band. The band toured with many popular bands in support of the album, as well as played some big European festivals.

== Background and development ==
The band was formed by vocalist Jared Gomes, also known as "M.C.U.D." (MC Underdog), and guitarist Wes Geer, who became friends amidst the Orange County hardcore punk scene. Gomes and Geer recruited guitarist Chizad, bassist Mawk, drummer B.C. Vaught and DJ Product © 1969. They named the group "Hed", which was based on a song written by Gomes called "Heavy Head". The band built a following with their energetic performances at local venues, and released the self-financed extended play Church of Realities. Legal issues forced Hed to change their name, adding "PE", which stood for "Planetary Evolution (later changed to planet earth) ". Hed PE signed with Jive Records, releasing their self-titled debut album in 1997 and it sold 100,000 units worldwide. Due to the label's contractual terms and the disappointing sales of the album, the band found themselves unable to repay the cash advances given to them by Jive.

== Music ==
In contrast to the band's first album, which largely mixed hardcore punk with hip hop, Broke incorporates new elements, including classic rock and world music influences.

AllMusic described the musical style of Broke as drawing from hip hop and that Hed PE "opted for slick production and mundane verse/chorus/verse formatting rather than continuing to blaze a path as the hip-hop-influenced hardcore band (hed)pe's debut album proudly announced they were." CMJ described the album's sound as combining "down-tuned guitars with booty-licious beats...and hardcore raps that are littered by more cussing than a sailor."

Beatdust described the band as "becoming another Limp Bizkit clone" with Broke and the subsequent Blackout, which were recorded to pay back the losses owed to the label to recoup the commercial failure of the band's 1997 self-titled debut album.

The album features guest appearances in recognition of Hed PE's hardcore punk and heavy metal influences, including Dead Kennedys guitarist East Bay Ray, who performs on the song "Waiting to Die", and singers Serj Tankian of System of a Down and Morgan Lander of Kittie, who appear on the song "Feel Good".

== Release and promotion ==
The album was released on August 22, 2000 by Jive records on CD, Cassette and Vinyl (Japan)

=== Singles ===
The song "Bartender" was released in 2000 as the lead single from the album and saw moderate success on the charts, peaking at #23 on the Mainstream Rock chart, as well as #27 on the Modern rock tracks chart. "Killing Time" was released as the second single for the album. The music video for the song was produced in promotion for the movie 3000 Miles to Graceland. "The Meadow (Special Like You)" was released as the third single

=== Touring ===
The band toured United States, Europe, Australia and Japan in support of the album. The band started with playing on the Tattoo the Earth tour alongside bands like Slipknot and Slayer, then touring in support of the bands like P.O.D., Linkin Park and Papa Roach, as well as sharing stages with bands like Metallica and Tool. The band also headlined tours with bands like Nonpoint and Spineshank opening for them, as well as playing big European festivals like Rock Am Ring and Reading

== Critical reception ==
Professional ratings
Review scores
Source	Rating
AllMusic	3/5 stars
Melody Maker	4/5 stars
Q	3/5 stars
Rolling Stone	3/5 stars

Response from professional critics was mixed. AllMusic's Jason D. Taylor wrote that the album "may have not found as much success in the competitive mainstream market as some would have liked, and even despite its distinct departure from the group's debut, it is an album that shows more vision than other rap-tinged rock albums to come out in 2000."

Rolling Stone said that with Broke, "Rap metal has found its Motley Crue."

Q described the album's sound as being "Focused and mature" and said that Hed PE "possess the wherewithal to express their anger and frustration musically..."

Melody Maker said the album was "about as black as this pimp-rock is gonna get, hip-hop credible in a way no one in the field has been since Urban Dance Squad....it's a great album..."

The most negative response to the album came from critics who viewed its lyrics as misogynistic.

== Commercial performance ==
The album was a greater success than the band's debut album, peaking at #63 on the Billboard 200, thanks to the album's lead single "Bartender". Broke also peaked at #79 in Australia and #73 in UK. In 2003, it was reported that the album sold 250,000 units worldwide. So far, Broke sold 450,000 units worldwide, making it the band's most successful release.

== Legacy ==
Jive Records included the songs "Bartender", "Killing Time", "Swan Dive", "The Meadow (Special Like You)" and "Feel Good" on the compilation The Best of Hed Planet Earth, which was released without the band's authorization, permission, consent, or knowledge.

"Bartender" and "Killing Time" were also included on Major Pain 2 Indee Freedom: The Best of Hed P.E., which was compiled by the band and released by Suburban Noize Records.

American heavy metal magazine Loudwire included the album on its "Top 50 Nu-Metal Albums of All-Time" list

== Track listing ==
No.	Title	Writer(s)	Length
1.	"Killing Time"	Geer/Shaine/Young	3:55
2.	"Waiting to Die" (featuring East Bay Ray)	Geer/Shaine/Benekos	3:15
3.	"Feel Good" (featuring Serj Tankian and Morgan Lander)	Geer/Shaine/Benekos	4:15
4.	"Bartender"	Geer/Shaine/Benekos/Fekaris/Zesses	4:01
5.	"Crazy Legs"	Geer/Shaine/Young	4:04
6.	"Pac Bell"	Geer/Shaine/Benekos/Young/Vaught/Boyce	4:54
7.	"I Got You"	Geer/Shaine/Young	3:44
8.	"Boom (How You Like That)"	Geer/Shaine/Boyce	3:56
9.	"Swan Dive"	Geer/Shaine/Benekos	3:35
10.	"Stevie"	Geer/Shaine/Benekos	3:32
11.	"Jesus (of Nazareth)"	Geer/Shaine/Young	5:35
12.	"The Meadow (Special Like You)"	Geer/Shaine/Benekos	9:31
Total length:			50:22

Japanese edition bonus track
No.	Title	Length
13.	"Bad Dream"	3:51

== Personnel ==
- Jahred a.k.a. M.C.U.D. a.k.a. Paulo Sergio – vocals
- Wesstyle – lead guitar
- Chad a.k.a. Chizad – rhythm guitar
- DJ Product © 1969 – turntables
- B.C. a.k.a. B.C. The Mizak Diza – drums and percussion
- Mawk – bass

=== Additional musicians ===
- East Bay Ray – guitar on "Waiting to Die"
- Serj Tankian – vocals on "Feel Good"
- Morgan Lander – vocals on "Feel Good"

== Charts ==
Chart (2000)	Peak position
Australian Albums (ARIA)	79
Scottish Albums (Official Charts)	93
UK Albums (Official Charts)	73
UK Rock & Metal Albums (Official Charts)	3
UK Independent Albums (Official Charts)	10
US Billboard 200	63
