= The Best of Hed Planet Earth =

The Best of (həd) Planet Earth

Greatest hits album by (həd) Planet Earth
- Released: June 6, 2006
- Genre: Nu metal; rap metal; punk rock
- Label: Jive Records

Hed PE chronology
The Best of (həd) Planet Earth (2006)	Major Pain 2 Indee Freedom: The Best of Hed P.E. (2010)

The Best of (həd) Planet Earth is a compilation album by American nu metal band Hed PE. Released on June 6, 2006, the album was compiled by Jive Records from the group's first three albums, Hed PE, Broke and Blackout, and released without the group's knowledge or consent.

== Reception ==
Professional ratings
Review scores
Source	Rating
AllMusic	3.5/5 stars

In his review of the album, AllMusic's Rob Theakston wrote "[The Best of Hed Planet Earth] may not be a definitive look at the group, but it's a nice overview of the first half of the band's career."

== Track listing ==
No.	Title	Length
1.	"Suck it Up"
2.	"Bartender"
3.	"Blackout"
4.	"Killing Time"
5.	"Ken 2012"
6.	"Waiting to Die"
7.	"Serpent Boy"
8.	"Swan Dive"
9.	"Darky"
10.	"Other Side"
11.	"Ground"
12.	"Firsty"
13.	"The Meadow (Special Like You)"
14.	"Tired of Sleep (T.O.S.)"
15.	"Feel Good" (Featuring Serj Tankian and Morgan Lander)
