= Jared Gomes =

American singer & rapper (born 1964)

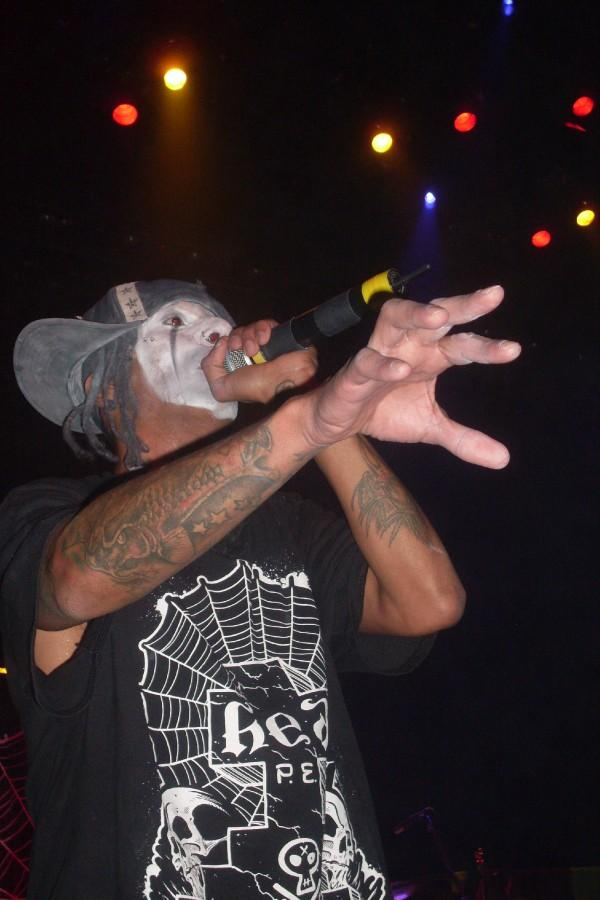
- Gomes performing with Hed PE in 2008

Background information
- Also known as: M.C.U.D., Jahred Shaine
- Born: Paulo Sergio Gomes; February 29, 1964 (age 62); Fort Worth, Texas, U.S.
- Origin: Fullerton, California, U.S.
- Genres: Alternative metal; punk rock; nu metal; rap metal; new wave
- Occupations: Rapper, singer, musician
- Instruments: Vocals, melodica
- Years active: 1984–present

Paulo Sergio "Jared" Gomes, also known as Jahred and M.C.U.D. ("MC Underdog") (born February 29, 1964), is an American singer and rapper best known as the lead vocalist of Hed PE.

== Biography ==
Gomes was born Paulo Sergio Gomes on February 29, 1964, in Fort Worth, Texas, to a mother of Indigenous Brazilian descent and a father of Afro-Brazilian descent. He got his first start in the music industry as the frontman of the new wave band the Clue, which was active from 1984 until 1990. After that he fronted Live Urban Sexx Tribe from 1991 to 1994. He later met guitarist Wes Geer amidst the Orange County hardcore punk scene, and the two formed a band, recruited guitarist Chizad, bassist Mawk, drummer B.C. Vaught and DJ Product 1969. They named the group "Hed", which stands for "higher education". The band built a following based on energetic performances at local venues such as Club 369 and released the self-financed extended play Church of Realities. Legal issues forced Hed to change their name, adding "PE" (Planet Earth). The band signed with Jive Records, but later found themselves unable to repay the cash advances given to them the label. Gomes is quoted as saying "We had these romantic visions of the music industry, and we thought it would be cool to be a punk band on a rap label. So we fulfilled that dream, but it was also probably the worst thing that could have happened. [...] We've had offers from Sony and others that we can't take because we owe Jive so much money." On October 27, 2000, Gomes was arrested for possession of marijuana while the band was performing in Waterbury, Connecticut. He was released on a US$1,500 bail. After recording two more albums for the label, the band left Jive to release albums independently, eventually signing with Suburban Noize Records.

Gomes has expressed interest in recording a solo album in the hip hop genre, stating "I would like to but I just have to find the time to do it. [...] I just need to get my discipline down and use my time more wisely than watching South Park for eight hours straight." In 2007, Gomes appeared on Twiztid's sixth studio album, Independents Day, contributing to the track "Weak Shit'z Out". According to Gomes, he had previously discussed appearances on solo albums by System of a Down bassist Shavo Odadjian and Korn guitarist James Shaffer, but the projects had fallen through.

== Style and influences ==
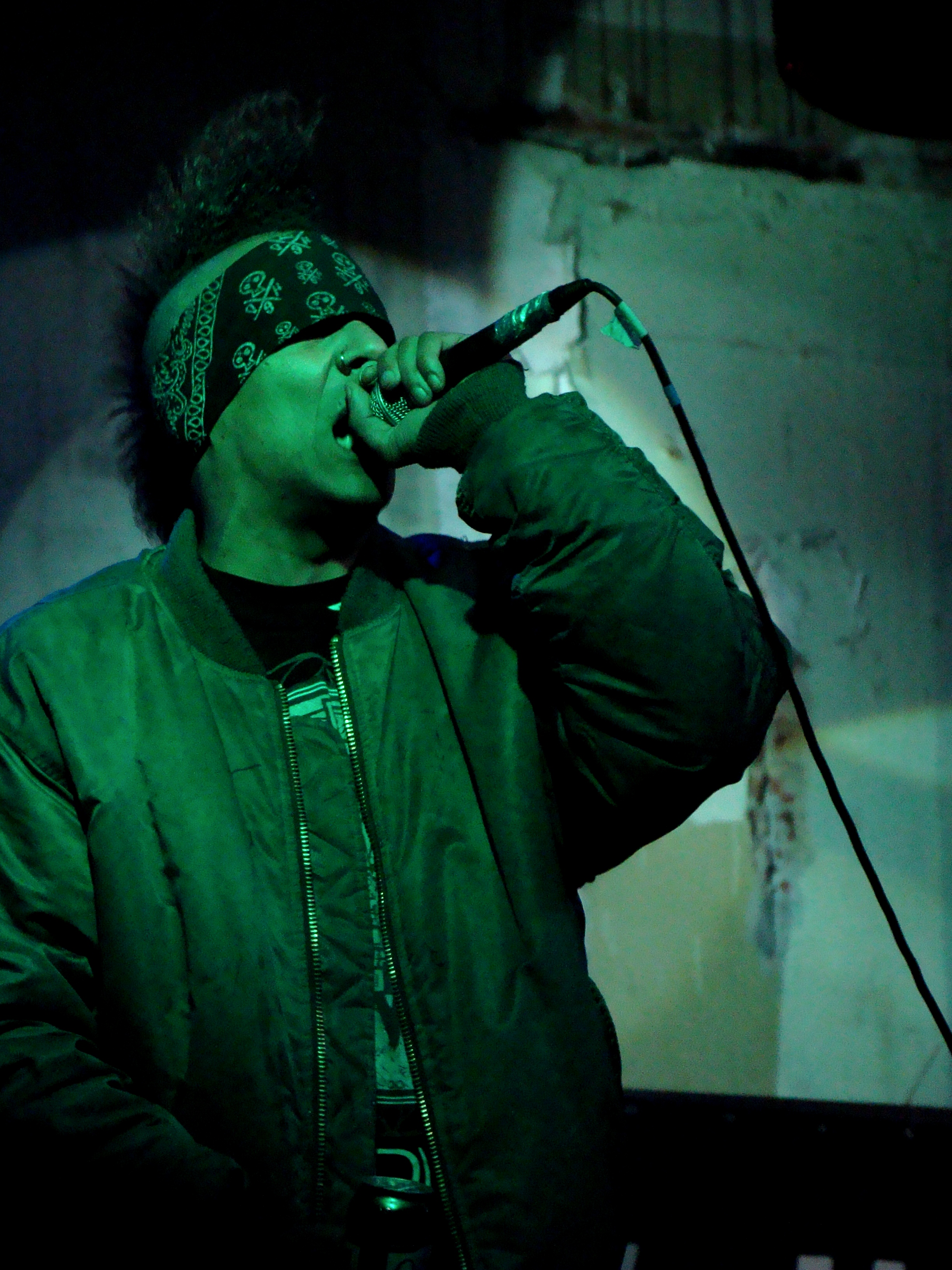
Gomes with Hed PE in Lviv, Ukraine, 2012.

Gomes' vocal style ranges from melodic singing to rapping and death growls. His influences include Bob Marley, Black Sabbath, Rage Against the Machine, Sublime, Sex Pistols, the Clash, Public Image Ltd., the Ramones, Beastie Boys, N.W.A, Tupac Shakur, along with various punk rock, reggae, ska, and heavy metal bands.

== Personal life ==
Gomes is married, resides in Idaho, and has a son and daughter.

Gomes is a supporter of the 9/11 Truth movement.

== Discography ==
=== With Hed PE ===
- Hed PE (1997)
- Broke (2000)
- Blackout (2003)
- Only in Amerika (2004)
- Back 2 Base X (2006)
- Insomnia (2007)
- The D.I.Y. Guys (2008)
- New World Orphans (2009)
- Truth Rising (2010)
- Evolution (2014)
- Forever! (2016)
- Stampede (2019)
- Class of 2020 (2020)
- Sandmine – EP (2021)
- Califas Worldwide (2022)
- Detox (2023)
- New and Improved (2025)
- Relapse (2026)

=== Solo projects ===
- Unite EP (March 27, 2012)
- Doomsday Paradise (Single) (2012)

=== Guest appearances ===
- Primer 55 – "Set It Off" from the album Introduction to Mayhem (2000)
- Snot – "I Know Where You Are At" from the album Strait Up (2000)
- Twiztid – "Weak Shit'z Out" from the album Independents Day (2007)
- DJ Muggs – "Wikid" from the album Bass For Your Face (2013)
- Tech N9ne – "I Am Everything" from the album Killer (2008)
- Bloodstepp – "Blood Steps Pt. 1" from the album Bass and Bubblegum (2013)
- Sketchy Waze x HomeTown Criminal – "Save Yourself" (2013 Breaking Ordinance LP)
- Urban Rebel – "Awake" (2013 single)
- December in Red – "Hadouken" (2014 single)
- Bloodstepp – "Blood Steps (The Complete Saga)" from the album Grand Theft Ufo: Floppy Disk Edition (2014)
- L.S.F. – "Firebreather" from the album Verbally Abusive (2016)
- sQuawk! – "The Answer" (2017 single)
- Arhythmia – "YOLO" (2013 "Time No Coming Back" LP)
- Lethal Injektion - "The Awakening" from the album Judgement Night (2017)
- ABiCA "Temptation" (2023 Single)
- Clouds Over California - "My Vice" (2023 Single)

== Singles ==
Year	Single	Album
2012	"Doomsday Paradise"(w/ Hed PE)	Doomsday Paradise (Single)
