= The Pilot (song) =

Single by Double Experience

from the album Rock (Geology)
- Released: November 14, 2017
- Recorded: October 2017
- Studio: Warrior Sound Studios, Chapel Hill, NC
- Genre: Nerd rock, hard rock
- Length: 2:55
- Label: Colfax Rock
- Songwriter(s): Brock Tinsley, Ian Nichols
- Producer(s): Double Experience

Double Experience singles chronology
"The Glimmer Shot" (2016)	"The Pilot" (2017)	"Oh Listener Mine" (2018)

"The Pilot" is the first single from Double Experience's third studio album Rock (Geology), officially released on November 14, 2017.

== Background ==
On October 5, 2017, Double Experience's official Facebook page announced their new single and its release date. The band later announced a launch party in Ottawa to celebrate the song's release.

== Music video ==
Double Experience released a music video for "The Pilot" on November 9, 2017.

== Track listing ==
Digital download
No.	Title	Length
1.	"The Pilot"	2:55

== Release history ==
Country	Date	Format	Label
Global	November 14, 2018	Digital download	Colfax Rock
