= Mower (band) =

American punk band

- Also known as: Slower
- Origin: San Diego, California
- Genres: Hardcore Punk, Nu metal: Punk rock
- Years active: Early 1990s – 2015
- Label: Suburban Noize Records
- Members: Brian Sheerin; Dominic Moscatello; Chris McCredie; Brian "Stone" Pennington; Jessie Tato
- Website: Official Page

Mower is a hardcore/punk jazz band from San Diego, California, formed in the early 1990s. The band released their debut album, Mower, in 2003 on Suburban Noize Records. The band's alter ego 'Slower' is a softer version of the band with more of a softer jazz/lounge punk sound.

== Biography ==
Mower is a punk band from California, with two vocalists, Brian Sheerin and Dominic Moscatello. The band is signed to Suburban Noize Records and released three albums on the record label: Mower (2003), Not for You (2006), and Make It a Double (2009). Slower is a softer "alter ego" of Mower and releases songs on Mower's albums. Slower has all of the same band members but perform a softer, jazzier version of Mower. In 1999, Mower went on the Vans Warped Tour.

== Discography ==
- Mower (2003)
- Not for You (2006)
- Make It a Double (2009)

== Members ==
- Brian Sheerin (vocals)
- Dominic Moscatello (vocals)
- Chris McCredie (bass)
- Brian "Stone" Pennington (guitar)
- Jessie Tato (drums)
