= New World Orphans =

Studio album by (hed) ^{p.e.}
- Released: January 13, 2009
- Recorded: May–October 2008
- Genres: Nu metal, rap metal, punk rock
- Length: 81:15
- Labels: Suburban Noize; Shock
- Producers: Jahred Gomes, Brad Xavier, Kevin Zinger

(hed) ^{p.e.} chronology
| Insomnia (2007) | New World Orphans (2009) | Truth Rising (2010) |

Singles from New World Orphans
- 1. "Ordo (ab Chao)" Released: November 4, 2008; 2. "Renegade" Released: December 20, 2008; 3. "Here And Now" Released: April 22, 2009

New World Orphans is the seventh studio album by American rock band Hed PE. Released on January 13, 2009, it is the band's fourth album on Suburban Noize.

== Music and lyrics ==
New World Orphans was influenced by Suicidal Tendencies and Minor Threat. The album's sound fuses heavy metal, hip hop and punk rock; it also includes elements of hardcore punk, funk and reggae. The album's lyrics derive from the 9/11 Truth movement, criticism of George W. Bush, the existence of extraterrestrial life, the economy and the Iraq War.

== Background ==
Hed PE had been working on the album since before the release of The D.I.Y. Guys with front man Jared Gomes notifying it through various MySpace posts. Three studio recorded tracks rumored to be on New World Orphans, "War on the Middle Class", "Ordo (ab Chao)", and "Bloodfire", were released via the live CD/DVD combo set, The D.I.Y. Guys on July 8, 2008. The tracks were rough versions of what would later appear on the album.

On November 4, 2008, the band released the music video for "Ordo (ab Chao)" via the band's MySpace. The video showed a different mix than that of the version released on The D.I.Y. Guys, including new instrumentation such as a melodica during the verses. On November 25, 2008, New World Orphans second single, "Renegade", premiered online on the band's official Facebook account. A video for the song was produced, and premiered on December 20. It was directed by Philip Carrer and Chad Archibald and produced by Lee Hartney of the Smith Street Band for Guelph's premiere film production studio Black Fawn Film alongside film collective Bleeding Apple. Drummer Chris Hendrich appears in the "Renegade" music video with the band.

On November 19, 2008, the official track listing and album artwork were revealed. The album was released in three different color variations of the cover: black, red and white. Each version features exclusive tracks corresponding to their version color. The artwork and final track listing were officially posted via the album's official promotional website.

New World Orphans also features guest collaborations including Suburban Noize Records' Kottonmouth Kings and The Dirtball, and Strange Music's Tech N9ne.

As with all post Jive Records albums, New World Orphans was produced by Jared Gomes.

== Reception ==
Professional ratings
Review scores
| Source | Rating |
|---|---|
| About.com | 3/5 stars |
| AbsolutePunk | 73% |
| Allmusic | 4/5 stars |
| Rock Sound | (7/10) |
| The Skinny | 1/5 stars |

New World Orphans debuted at 72 on the Billboard 200, their first inside 100 since Blackout. The album also peaked no. 5 on the Top Internet albums as well as no. 4 on the Top Independent albums.

== Track listing ==
All tracks are written by Jared Gomes and Jaxon Benge, except where noted.

| No. | Title | Writer(s) | Length |
|---|---|---|---|
| 1. | "New World Intro" | | 1:01 |
| 2. | "Live or Die Free" | | 1:58 |
| 3. | "Bloodfire" | | 2:48 |
| 4. | "Ordo (ab Chao)" | | 2:42 |
| 5. | "Stay Ready" (featuring The Dirtball) | | 4:15 |
| 6. | "Family" | | 2:47 |
| 7. | "Stepping Stone" | | 3:14 |
| 8. | "Renegade" | | 3:29 |
| 9. | "Everything All the Time" | Gomes | 3:03 |
| 10. | "Mortgage Crisis Intro" | | 0:20 |
| 11. | "Middle Class Blues" | | 1:44 |
| 12. | "Flesh and Blood" | Gomes | 4:18 |
| 13. | "Nibiru Intro" | | 0:30 |
| 14. | "Planet X" | | 3:44 |
| 15. | "Higher Ground" (featuring Kottonmouth Kings) | Gomes | 3:57 |
| 16. | "A Soldiers Intro" | | 0:12 |
| 17. | "Tow the Line" | | 3:59 |
| 18. | "Self Aware" | | 3:09 |
| 19. | "Lost History Intro" | | 0:23 |
| 20. | "This Love" | Gomes | 3:06 |

Bonus tracks
| No. | Title | Length |
|---|---|---|
| 21. | "Work On This" (featuring Tech N9ne) | 4:24 |
| 22. | "Babylon Fall" | 3:30 |

Limited edition black cover
| No. | Title | Length |
|---|---|---|
| 23. | "Bucky Lasek" (Demo) | 1:32 |
| 24. | "Don't Fuck with Us" (Demo) | 2:09 |

Limited edition white cover
| No. | Title | Length |
|---|---|---|
| 23. | "Cities on the Moon" (Demo) | 2:27 |
| 24. | "Hey Now" (Demo) | 2:51 |

Limited edition red cover
| No. | Title | Length |
|---|---|---|
| 25. | "Girlfriend" (Demo) | 4:30 |
| 26. | "Born2Ride" (featuring Big B) (demo) | 3:24 |

Australian release
| No. | Title | Length |
|---|---|---|
| 23. | "Born 2 Ride" (featuring Big B) (demo) | 3:26 |
| 24. | "Girlfriend" (Demo) | 4:31 |
| 25. | "4SmokazOnly" (featuring Potluck) (demo) | 3:55 |
| 26. | "Don't Fuck with Us" (Demo) | 2:08 |

Tri-colored reissue
| No. | Title | Length |
|---|---|---|
| 21. | "Here and Now" | 3:28 |
| Total length: | | 1:23:02 |

== Personnel ==
(Hed) Planet Earth

- Jahred Gomes - vocals, melodica
- Jaxon - guitar
- DJ Product © 1969 - turntables, melodica, vocals
- Mawk (Mark Young) - bass
- Tiny Bubz - drums, percussion
- Jeremiah «Trauma» Stratton - drums, percussion on "Here and Now"

Production

- Produced by Jahred Gomes, Brad Xavier & Kevin Zinger
- Management by Kevin Zinger & Ivory Daniel (The Regime)
- Art direction by Casey Quintal & Hed PE
- Design by Casey Quintal
- Pyramid by Jaxon

== Charts ==
| Chart (2009) | Peak position |
|---|---|
| US Billboard 200 | 72 |
| US Billboard Top Rock Albums | 22 |
| U.S. Billboard Independent Albums | 4 |
| US Billboard Top Hard Rock Albums | 11 |
| U.S. Billboard Tastemaker Albums | 12 |
