= Insomnia (Hed PE album) =

Studio album by (həd) ^{p.e.}
- Released: July 17, 2007
- Genre: Nu metal; rap metal; punk rock
- Length: 59:32
- Label: Suburban Noize
- Producer: Jahred

(həd) ^{p.e.} chronology
Back 2 Base X (2006)	Insomnia (2007)	New World Orphans (2009)

Singles from Insomnia
- 1. "Suffa" Released: July 4, 2007; 2. "Comeova2nite" Released: 2007

Professional ratings
Review scores
Source	Rating
Metal Injection	1/10
MetalSucks	1/5
Royal Flush	4/5 stars

Insomnia is the sixth studio album by American rock band (həd) ^{p.e.}. It was released on July 17, 2007 via Suburban Noize Records. Production was handled by the band's lead singer Jahred. It features guest appearances from Big B, Kottonmouth Kings, Roscoe and Tech N9NE. The album peaked at number 138 on the Billboard 200 and number 16 on the Independent Albums in the United States. The album's lead single, "Suffa", became one of the most requested tracks at Sirius Satellite Radio's Hard Attack, while the song's music video was voted one of the Top 10 of 2007 on MTV's Headbangers Ball. Hed PE has cited thrash metal bands such as Slayer as an influence on the musical style of Insomnia.

== Track listing ==
No.	Title	Writer(s)	Length
1.	"Madhouse"	Paulo Sergio Gomes	2:05
2.	"Walk On By"	Gomes; Jackson Lee Benge	4:26
3.	"Game Over"	Gomes; Benge	4:58
4.	"Habeus"	Gomes; Benge	3:42
5.	"Suffa"	Gomes; Benge	2:57
6.	"Comeova2nite" (featuring Roscoe)	Gomes	4:17
7.	"C2GU"	Gomes; Benge	1:51
8.	"RTO" (featuring Big B)	Gomes; Benge	4:36
9.	"Mirrorballin"	Gomes; Benge	4:30
10.	"Tienanman Squared"	Gomes; Raymond Ramirez	3:29
11.	"Children"	Stephen Stills	4:01
12.	"Atlantis A.D."	Gomes; Benge	5:57
13.	"Wind Me Up" (featuring Kottonmouth Kings and Tech N9NE)	Gomes	5:13
14.	"Don't Let Me Down"	Gomes; Benge	7:17
Total length:			59:32

Japanese bonus track
No.	Title	Length
15.	"Get 'Em Up" (featuring SubNoize Souljaz)	4:29

== Personnel ==
(həd) ^{p.e.}

- Paulo Sergio «Jared» Gomes – lead vocals, production, mixing, art direction, cover
- Jackson Lee «Jaxon» Benge – guitar
- Mark «Mawk» Young – bass
- Devin Lebsack – drums
- Doug «DJ Product 1969 ©» Boyce – turntables

Production

- Patrick «P-Nice» Shevelin – engineering
- Tom Baker – mastering
- Kevin Zinger – executive producer, management
- Brad «Daddy X» Xavier – executive producer
- Casey Quintal – art direction, cover, artwork, layout
- Ivory Daniel – management
- The Rabbi Michael Zimmerman – various punk rock back ups

== Charts ==
Chart (2007)	Peak position
US Billboard 200	138
US Independent Albums (Billboard)	16
