= Blackout (Hed PE album) =

Studio album by Hed PE
- Released: March 18, 2003
- Recorded: 2002
- Studios: The Machine Shop, Hoboken, New Jersey / Studio West, San Diego, California / Cello Studios, Hollywood, California / Chunky Style Music, Los Angeles, California / NRG Recording Services, North Hollywood, California
- Genres: Nu metal; rap metal
- Length: 49:46
- Labels: Jive; Music for Nations; Volcano
- Producers: Machine; Steve Thompson; Mike Bradford

Hed PE chronology
Broke (2000)	Blackout (2003)	Only in Amerika (2004)

Singles from Blackout
- 1. "Blackout" Released: February 4, 2003; 2. "Other Side" Released: June 17, 2003

Blackout is the third studio album by American rock band Hed PE. Released on March 18, 2003, Blackout peaked at number 33 on the Billboard 200, selling 28,000 copies in its first week, while its title track peaked at number 21 on the Hot Mainstream Rock Tracks chart and at number 32 on the Hot Modern Rock Tracks chart. A second single, "Other Side", peaked at number 40 on the Hot Mainstream Rock Tracks chart. The album also peaked at number 102 in the United Kingdom. The song "Get Away" is featured in NASCAR Thunder 2003 produced by EA Sports. Sonny Mayo is credited playing guitar, but didn't play according to an interview with Good Company. This is the last release by the band to have two Guitarists, after Chizad quit in 2002.

== Production ==
Jared Gomes later reflected unfavorably on the album's production, claiming that the label was trying to achieve commercial success by forcing a nu metal sound. Gomes stated in 2011, "all my decisions were being overlooked by the record company I was under when producing it… causing me to hold back on things, change song structures and all other kinds of shit in order to try and get into the radio friendly scene to fit in with the nu-metal movement… and as I complied I grew to dislike what I was becoming." Eventually, Gomes said, he would try to make the band's next album, Only in Amerika as uncommercial as possible, to provoke people lyrically as a backlash against the more commercial sound of Blackout.

== Music and lyrics ==
The music in Blackout shows a huge shift in the band's sound in comparison to previous two albums. It includes much more singing and a lot less rapping, going for a more mainstream-friendly sound. Jahred’s lyrics on the album reflect a dark time after the success of “Broke” when he battled severe depression.

Beatdust described the band as "becoming another Limp Bizkit clone" with Broke and Blackout, which were recorded to pay back the losses owed to the label to recoup the commercial failure of the band's 1997 self-titled debut album.

== Release and promotion ==
The album was released on March 18, 2003 by Jive records on CD and Cassette

=== Singles ===
The album's title track was released as the lead single from the album on February 4, 2003. The song saw some success on the charts, peaking at #21 on the Mainstream Rock chart and at #32 on Modern Rock Tracks chart. It was reported that the single was downloaded 50,000 times from the band's website. The music video for the song was also produced. The song "Other Side" was released as the second single and it peaked at #40 on the Modern rock tracks chart.

=== Touring ===
The band toured United States to promote the album. The band started with co-headlining the spring edition of the Jägermeister Music Tour with Saliva. The band then toured in support of Godsmack, as well as headlining tours with bands like Nonpoint and Noise Ratchet opening for them. They also played some big festivals in the United States, most notable being Summerfest.

Professional ratings
Review scores
Source	Rating
Allmusic	4/5 stars
Melodic.net	3.5/5 stars

== Reception ==
Allmusic's Johnny Loftus wrote that "While it expands on melodic elements that had previously played a supporting role in the band's sound, Blackout also delivers truckloads of crushing guitar and pounding rhythm. And whether or not it is the presence of a top-line producer, (hed) pe have figured out a way to imbue their aggressive mix of heavy rock and hip-hop with some serious hooks."

== Commercial performance ==
Blackout peaked at #33 on the Billboard 200, selling 28,000 copies in its first week of release, making it the band's highest position on the chart. The album also peaked at #58 in Australia and #102 in UK.

== In popular culture ==
The songs from the album appeared on couple of EA Sports titles. The title track was used in the video game MVP Baseball 2003. The song "Suck it Up" was used in Madden NFL 2003 and the song "Get Away" was used in NASCAR Thunder 2003.

== Track listing ==
Blackout
No.	Title	Writer(s)	Length
1.	"Suck It Up"	Jahred; Mawk	3:56
2.	"Bury Me"	Jahred; Mawk	3:05
3.	"Dangerous"	Chad; Jahred; Wes	3:26
4.	"Blackout"	Jahred	3:53
5.	"Get Away"	Jahred; Mawk	3:18
6.	"Crazy Life"	B.C.; Chad; Dj Product; Jahred; Mawk; Wes	3:43
7.	"Half the Man"	Chad; Jahred; Wes	4:42
8.	"The Only One"	B.C.; Chad; DJ Product; Jahred; Mawk; Wes	3:33
9.	"Other Side"	Jahred; Mawk	3:36
10.	"Flesh and Bone"	B.C.; DJ Product; Jahred; Mawk; Wes	3:48
11.	"Octopussy"	Wes	0:44
12.	"Carnivale"	Jahred; Wes	3:59
13.	"Fallen"	Jahred; Wes	4:01
14.	"Revelations"	Jahred; Wes	4:10
Total length:			49:46

UK & Japanese Bonus Track
No.	Title	Length
15.	"Dracula"	4:13

== Personnel ==
(hed) Planet Earth

- Jahred Gomes – vocals, lyrics
- Wesstyle – guitar
- Doug «DJ Product 1969 ©» Boyce – turntables
- Mark «Mawk» Young – bass
- Ben C. Vaught – drums

Production

- Produced by Machine, Steve Thompson (8) & Mike Bradford (9)
- Engineered by Machine, Krish Sharma, John Goodmanson (8), Dan Leffler, Jason Kohlmann, Darrell Harvey, Matthew Adrian Marti, Chris Ohno & Joey Paradise
- Mixed by Steve Thompson, John Goodmanson, Jason Vescio & Paul Smith, at Skip Saylor Recording, Los Angeles / Rich Costey, Darren Mora & Dan Leffler (4, 8, 10), at Cello Studios, Hollywood, California
- Mastered by Ted Jensen, at Sterling Sound, New York City
- Arranged by Steve Thompson (8)
- Additional guitar by Chad Benekos
- Programming by Machine, Wes Geer & Mark Young
- Sound design & additional programming by Clinton Bradley
- Management by Shannon O'Shea (SOS Management), Rick Sales & Kristen Mulderig (Sanctuary Artist Management)
- Manufactured by Zomba Recording Corporation
- Photo by Andrew MacNaughtan
- Art direction & design by Elisa Garcia
- Cover art by Axis

== Charts ==
Chart (2003)	Peak position
Australian Albums (ARIA)	58
UK Albums (Official Charts)	102
UK Rock & Metal Albums (Official Charts)	9
UK Independent Albums (Official Charts)	14
US Billboard 200	33
