= Church of Realities =

EP by həd
- Released: 1995
- Genre: Nu metal, rap metal, punk rock
- Length: 45:05

Hed PE chronology
(Hed)8 Track (EP) (1994)	Church of Realities (1995)	(həd)^{pe} (1997)

Church of Realities is the sophomore extended play by American rock band Hed PE. Self-distributed in 1995, it was the band's first release.

== Production ==
DJ Product©1969 drew the EP's cover.

== Music ==
The music of Church of Realities establishes the band's trademark style, which primarily fuses elements of punk rock and hip hop. It also includes elements of funk, jazz and metal.

The EP's lyrical themes include "race, overcoming life's obstacles [and] government abuse", according to the OC Weekly.

== Release ==
The album was independently produced by the band and distributed without a supporting label in 1995.

== Legacy ==
Following the EP's release, the band changed its name, adding "PE", which stood for "Planet Earth", and signed with Jive Records, who released their self-titled LP in 1997. All tracks except "Inro" and "Hangman" from this EP were re-recorded for the LP, "1st Song" and "Spam" changed their names to "Firsty" and "Schpamb". Fred Durst of Limp Bizkit was inspired by this EP when recording Limp Bizkit's Three Dollar Bill, Y'all.

== Track listing ==
No.	Title	Length
1.	"Inro"	4:06
2.	"1st Song"	2:16
3.	"Hangman"	4:44
4.	"Darky"	5:11
5.	"I.F.O."	18:06
6.	"Ground" (Hidden track)	2:09
7.	"Spam" (Hidden track)	4:25
8.	"Hill" (Hidden track)	4:04

== Personnel ==
=== həd ===
- M.C.U.D. — lead vocals; lyrics
- Wesstyle — lead guitar; music
- Chizad (Chad Benekos) — rhythm guitar, backing vocals; music (3–5)
- Mawk (Mark Young) — bass guitar; music (3, 5, & 8)
- Kenny Tha Finga (Ken Sachs) — keyboards
- DJ Product ©1969 (Doug Boyce) — turntables, backing vocals; music (3–5)
- B.C. (Ben C. Vaught) — drums/ percussion; music (3, 5, & 8)
