= MVP Baseball 2003 =

2003 video game

- Developer: EA Canada
- Publisher: EA Sports
- Directors: Ron Bignell; Henry Lee; Mark Lutz
- Producer: Brent Nielsen
- Programmer: Dee Jay Randall
- Artists: Alan Blouin; Cory Yip; Tyler Berrie; Jay Raymond
- Series: MVP Baseball
- Platforms: Xbox, PlayStation 2, Microsoft Windows
- Release: PlayStation 2, Xbox: NA: March 11, 2003; JP: June 5, 2003 (PS2); Windows: NA: March 25, 2003
- Genre: Sports (baseball)
- Modes: Single-player, multiplayer

MVP Baseball 2003 is a baseball video game developed by EA Canada and published by EA Sports for Xbox, PlayStation 2, and Microsoft Windows in 2003. It is the first installment of the MVP Baseball series, and was released as a successor to EA's Triple Play games, though it bore little more than a graphical similarity to its predecessors, which had been heavily maligned by critics in the series' final years. The PlayStation 2 version was ported to Japan for release on June 5, 2003.

Randy Johnson and Miguel Tejada were the cover players.

The 2003 game is the last game that uses a points system for player's salary; starting with the 2004 game an actual dollar amount is used for salaries. The 2003 game does not penalize a user for releasing a player during the season in franchise mode, whereas the 2004 and 2005 games invoke a salary penalty for releasing a player under contract.

== Reception ==
Reception

Aggregate score
Aggregator	Score		
Aggregator	PC	PS2	Xbox
Metacritic	78/100	81/100	82/100

Review scores
Publication	Score		
Publication	PC	PS2	Xbox
AllGame	3.5/5	3/5	N/A
Computer Games Magazine	2.5/5	N/A	N/A
Computer Gaming World	3.5/5	N/A	N/A
Electronic Gaming Monthly	N/A	7.67/10 (Note: Three critics of Electronic Gaming Monthly gave the PlayStation 2 version each a score of 7/10, 8.5/10, and 7.5/10.)	N/A
Game Informer	N/A	9.25/10	9.25/10
GameRevolution	N/A	A−	A−
GameSpot	8.1/10	8/10	7.8/10
GameSpy	3/5	4/5	4/5
GameZone	9.3/10	8.8/10	9/10
IGN	8.3/10	8.5/10	8.5/10
Official U.S. PlayStation Magazine	N/A	3.5/5	N/A
Official Xbox Magazine (US)	N/A	N/A	8.4/10
PC Gamer (US)	70%	N/A	N/A
X-Play	N/A	3/5	N/A

The game received "favorable" reviews on all platforms according to the review aggregation website Metacritic. GamePro said of the PlayStation 2 and Xbox versions, "Bottom line, MVP earns props for looking good and trying something new while delivering solid baseball. High Heat is a much better playing ballgame, but MVP will appeal to baseball fans intrigued by its individuality." (Note: GamePro gave the PlayStation 2 and Xbox versions each 5/5 for graphics, and three 4/5 scores for sound, control, and fun factor.)
