= Royal Flush (magazine) =

Royal Flush Magazine
- Editor: Josh Bernstein; Steve Chanks
- Categories: Satirical magazine
- Frequency: yearly
- Circulation: 40,000
- Publisher: The #Number Foundation
- Founded: 1997
- Country: United States
- Language: English
- Website: www.rfmag.com

Royal Flush is an American humor magazine founded by editor Josh Bernstein of The #Number Foundation in 1997. The magazine started as an outlet for pop artists and creative directors of other magazines. The New York City art scene has been publishing their collected works in Royal Flush for years. The magazine offers satire on many aspects of life and popular culture, rock music, and public figures.

== History ==
Royal Flush is in its fifteenth year of publication and has a circulation of more than 40,000. Recent issues of Royal Flush have featured cover stories with Rob Zombie, Hugh M. Hefner, Danny DeVito and the cast of It’s Always Sunny in Philadelphia, Joan Jett, Patton Oswalt, My Chemical Romance and the Misfits.

Their combination of art and music is unique in articles like the one by contributor Jeff Newelt about Frank Zappa and noted comic artist Jack Kirby. The magazine is represented at the Museum of Comic and Cartoon Art festival yearly.

The magazine has gotten reviews from and has been quoted by the Los Angeles Times, USA Today, Entertainment Weekly, The New York Post, PerezHilton, AOL, Village Voice and more.

== Recurring features ==
Royal Flush is known for many regular and semi-regular recurring features in its pages, including "Hispanic Batman" and "How Much Ya Bench?" the "music reviews", "Interviews with celebrities” and its television, movie and news story parodies.

== Contributors ==
Royal Flush has provided an ongoing showcase for many artists with many different styles. All the artists and writers contribute to the publication on a volunteer basis.

Writers:

- Josh Bernstein
- Steve Chanks
- Paul Cress
- Tina Benitez
- Steve Ruvolo
- Kurt Orzeck
- Jeff Newelt
- Dave Alexander
- Peter Kuper
- Seldon Hunt
- Kristin Koefoed
- Daniela Chunga
- Lawrence J Young II
- Mike Edison
- Brent Engstrom
- Patrick McQuade
- Ryan Dunlavey
- Adam Ganderson
- Larry Getlen
- Brad Angle
- Jimmy Hubbard
- G.G. Naked
- Lil’ Nubi
- Frank Powers
- Erik Rodriguez
- Ally Ruvolo
- Dan Epstein
- Harvey Pekar
- Rebecca Fain
- TJ Rosenthal
- Tim Bradstreet
- Alice Cooper
- Reyan Ali
- Anna Blumenthal
- Tim Hollingsworth
- John Reis
- David Rondinelli
- Scoop Wasserstein
- Tom Standard
- Neil Swaab
- James Wright
- Joe Puccio

Artists:

- Josh Bernstein
- Steve Chanks
- Paul Cress
- Sean Pryor
- Kristin Koefoed
- Brent Engstrom
- Patrick McQuade
- Ryan Dunlavey
- Frank Powers
- Erik Rodriguez
- Tim Bradstreet
- Danny Hellman
- Brian Ewing
- Tara McPherson
- Jesse Philips
- Stainboy
- Adam Swinbourne
- Frank Russo
- Martina Russo
- Emi Maus
- Chris Caniano
- Jim Altieri
- Pat Aulisio
- Scrojo
- Cojo
- Jason Goad
- Adam Turman
- Adam Roth
- Rob Schwager
- Jan Meininghaus
- Woodrow J. Hinton III
- Luis Diaz
- Jason Edmiston
- Gary Pullin
- Brett Marting
- Jesse Leftkowitz
- Paige Reynolds
- Derek Ballard
- Hydro 74
- Jim Mazza
- Matt Siren
- Tanxxx
- Jerry Lawler
- Derek Riggs
- Tom Standard
- Justin Erickson
- Sarah Antoinette-Martin
- Jeremy Plovony
- Robert Israel
- Jay Jay Jackson
- Jim Steranko
- Al Jaffee
- Lorenzo Mariani
- Bob Fingerman
- David Lloyd
- Jim Mahfood
- Paul Pope
- Ed Repka
- Pat Sandman
- Rick Veitch
- Robin Eley
- Drew Friedman
- Jason Dean
- Aaron Augenblick
- Peter Kuper
- K3n Adams
- Angryblue
- Florian Bertmer
- Seldon Hunt
- Bryan G. Brown
- Mitch O'Connell
- Basil Gogos
- David Kenedy
- Adam Kidder
- Jeph LaChance
- Mark McCormick
- John Pound
- JD Wilkes
- Shannon Wheeler
- Maximum Flouride
- R.Black
- James Jean
- James Wrona
- Michiko Strehenburger

Other Contributors:

- Judy Bernstein
- Jen Bernstein
- Kory Grow
- Mike Frankel
- Mara Lander
- Anna Dickson
- Anthony Scerri
- Alexis Cook
- Mike Wilson
- Patrick Albertson
- Jordan Hadley
- Eugene Wang
- Bryan Johnson
- Leni Sinclair
- Shannon Wheeler
- Justin Borucki
- Jessica Ciancanelli

=== Live events ===
Royal Flush started a series of launch events that included live performances by bands that appeared in the magazine in 2001. The first event was on May 12, 2001, at CBGB's and featured The Spicy Rizzaks, Harvey Loves Harvey and Dar Silicon.

Royal Flush is known for their annual “Book Release” parties at the Bowery Ballroom and CBGBs in NYC. Past shows have showcased bands like Clutch, Fiend Without a Face (featuring members of Mastodon), The Giraffes, Beatallica and dozens more.

Royal Flush has teamed up with some of the biggest festivals in music - including the CMJ Fest in NYC, and the Red Gorilla Fest in Austin's SXSW Festival -for events. Recently Royal Flush has teamed with the Rocks Off Cruises. for a series of concerts on NYC's East River with the Black Lips, The Bouncing Souls, The Electric Six and The Detroit Cobras.

2009 saw the start of the Royal Flush Festival. The Royal Flush Festival is a showcase for the independent film, art and music scene. Initially founded in 2005 as the E. Village City Film Fest in NYC's East Village, this festival is expanding dramatically in its fifth year.

The 2009 Royal Flush Festival featured such acts as the Raincoats, Melissa Auf der Maur of Hole and The Smashing Pumpkins, beat-boxer Kenny Muhammed and several other music events in addition to 5 days of film screenings, art openings, dance parties, panel discussions and much more.

The 2010 Royal Flush Festival returned and featured such acts as Biz Markie, Black Taxi, Dungen, Kaiju Big Battel, a Rob Zombie book signing at Forbidden Planet, a Brian Ewing book signing at Brooklyn Bowl and an American Hardcore signing at the Knitting Factory.

=== RFMAG.com ===
RFMAG.com is the online home of Royal Flush, the destination for news, events, contests, exclusive comics, interviews and their own “Hot Seat” interview.

royalflushmagazine.com gives backstage exclusives, current news stories, blogs and video game reviews all at a daily pace. RFMAG.com also has original programming and exclusive videos, including celebrity cooking, to a band's tour diary to secret concerts. There are also contests and giveaways hosted on the site.
