= Only in Amerika =

Studio album by Hed p.e.
- Released: October 19, 2004
- Genre: Nu metal; rap metal; punk rock
- Length: 50:22
- Label: Koch
- Producer: Jahred Gomes, Sean E

Hed PE chronology
Blackout (2003)	Only in Amerika (2004)	Back 2 Base X (2006)

Singles from Only In Amerika
- 1. "Represent" Released: March 29, 2005

Only in Amerika is the fourth studio album by American rock band Hed PE. Released on Koch Records on October 19, 2004, it is the band's first release on an independent label and the first album featuring guitarist Jaxon Benge and ex-Otep drummer Mark "Moke" Bistany. It peaked at #20 on the Top Independent Albums chart and at #186 on the Billboard 200.

== Music ==
The music of Only in Amerika incorporates elements of hip-hop, hardcore punk and heavy metal. AllMusic's Johnny Loftus wrote that Only in Amerika is a "thrash-hop spew [which] takes cues from Anthrax, Korn, Dirty South, pre-acting career Ice-T, and the uncompromising Psychopathic Records collective."

== Lyrical themes ==
Jared Gomes later revealed that the brash, offensive lyrical content was an intentional backlash against the more commercial and radio-friendly sound of Blackout, the band's previous album, which Gomes said was the product of Jive Records trying to shape the band into a mainstream act and shift its sound away from its punk rock roots.

According to Gomes, "With Only in Amerika, I was trying to push buttons and provoke people. I was exercising my right to freedom of speech".

Gomes expresses nationalist themes in the song "War", and elsewhere on the album, calling for retaliation against Al Qaeda for the 9/11 terrorist attacks. These sentiments are reiterated in the tracks "Wake Up" and lead single "Represent". In the bridge of the latter song, Gomes shouts-out John Hancock, Bob Marley, John F. Kennedy, and Malcolm X, among others. Lyrical themes on Only in Amerika primarily consist of sexual intercourse, clubbing, block parties, cannabis and alcohol consumption, angst, and lead rapper Jahred's resentment of pop-punk and censorship (namely that of the FCC and the "corporate faggots" at Jive Records), voicing his indignation toward the state of the music industry at large.

Jahred also makes several pop culture references throughout the album's lyrics, particularly to the O. J. Simpson affair, Trench Coat Mafia, Nick Berg, Nancy Reagan, Shaq, Mary-Kate and Ashley.

"Amerikan Beauty" interpolates a line from N.E.R.D.'s 2001 single "Lapdance". On the track "The Box", Jahred references the Bob Marley and the Wailers songs "Get Up, Stand Up", "Burnin' and Lootin'", "No Woman, No Cry", and "Three Little Birds" .

== Reception ==
Professional ratings
Review scores
Source	Rating
Allmusic	2/5 stars
Blabbermouth.net	4/10 stars
Melodic.net	2.5/5 stars

In his review of the album, AllMusic's Johnny Loftus wrote that Only in Amerika "wants to be a confrontational megaphone in the ear of conservatives, but Jahred's torrential rhetoric is too messy and blatantly offensive to incite anything but superficial anger, and the music -- though occasionally explosive -- takes a backseat to the ranting."

== Track listing ==
No.	Title	Writer(s)	Length
1.	"Foreplay"	Jahred; Jaxon	1:32
2.	"Represent"	Jahred; Jaxon	4:20
3.	"The Truth"	Jahred; Jaxon	3:03
4.	"Wake Up"	Jahred	4:35
5.	"War"	Jahred	3:49
6.	"The Box"	Jahred; Jaxon	3:28
7.	"CBC"	Jahred	3:33
8.	"Voices"	Jahred	3:13
9.	"Raise Hell"	Jahred	5:09
10.	"Amerikan Beauty"	Jahred	3:56
11.	"Chicken"	Jahred	4:22
12.	"Daydreams"	Jahred	2:43
13.	"Not Ded Yet"	Jahred; Jaxon	3:31
14.	"HED" (Hidden)	Jahred	3:07
Total length:			50:22

== Personnel ==
HED p.e.

- Jahred — lead vocals
- Jaxon — guitar
- Mawk (Mark Young) — bass
- DJ Product © 1969 (Doug Boyce) — turntables, backing vocals; album cover artwork
- Moke (Mark Bistany) — drums

Production

- Produced by Jahred Gomes & Sean E
- Mixed by Jahred Gomes, Chris Holmes & Ryan Boesch
- Drum mix by Chris Holmes & Ryan Boesch
- Drums engineering by Ryan Boesch
- A&R by Cliff Cultreri
- Marketing by John Franck
- Management by DAS Communications, Ltd.
- Design by Jeff Gilligan
- Logo by Stuart Chamberlain & Jahred Gomes
- Photo by Greg Watermann
