= Hed PE (album) =

(həd)^{pe}

Studio album by (həd)^{pe}
- Released: August 12, 1997
- Studio: Long View Farm Studios, North Brookfield, Massachusetts
- Genre: Nu metal; rap metal; punk rock
- Length: 58:49
- Label: Jive
- Producer: T-Ray

Hed PE chronology
Church of Realities (1995)	(həd)^{pe} (1997)	Broke (2000)

Singles from (həd)^{pe}
- 1. "Ground" Released: 1997; 2. "Serpent Boy" Released: 1998

Hed PE (stylized as (həd)^{pe}) is the debut album by the American rock band Hed PE. It was released on August 12, 1997, by Jive Records, and has sold over 100,000 copies.

== Music ==
Six of the tracks on this album were re-recorded from the band's debut EP, Church of Realities. The album's musical style is a fusion of punk, hip hop, metal, funk and reggae.

== Release ==
The album sold over 100,000 copies. Due to the label's contractual terms and the disappointing sales of the album, the band found themselves unable to repay the cash advances given to them by Jive. Jared Gomes is quoted as saying "We had these romantic visions of the music industry, and we thought it would be cool to be a punk band on a rap label. So we fulfilled that dream, but it was also probably the worst thing that could have happened. [...] We've had offers from Sony and others that we can't take because we owe Jive so much money."

== Reception ==
Professional ratings
Review scores
Source	Rating
AllMusic	4/5 stars
Kerrang!	4/5 stars

In his review of the album, AllMusic's Steve Huey wrote that "There are some slow and/or unfocused moments [...] but overall, its aggression will probably play well with late-'90s metal and punk fans."

== Track listing ==
No.	Title	Length
1.	"P.O.S."	3:13
2.	"Ground"	2:32
3.	"Serpent Boy"	5:50
4.	"Firsty"	2:32
5.	"Tired of Sleep (T.O.S.)"	3:51
6.	"Darky"	5:22
7.	"Schpamb"	3:05
8.	"Ken 2012"	5:08
9.	"Circus"	2:06
10.	"33"	4:06
11.	"Hill"	4:04
12.	"IFO"	4:56
13.	"Bitches: "Tits, Clits and Bong Hits"	12:03
Total length:		58:54

Japanese edition bonus track
No.	Title	Length
14.	"33 (Hip hop evolution mix)"	4:13

=== Note ===
The song "Bitches" ends at minute 5:30. After 3 minutes and 15 seconds of silence, at 8:45 begins the hidden track "Tits, Clits and Bong Hits".

== Personnel ==
=== (həd)pe ===
- Jared Gomes — lead vocals; lyrics
- Wesley Geer — lead guitar; music
- Chizad (Chad Benekos) — rhythm guitar, backing vocals; music (6, 8, & 12)
- Mawk (Mark Young) — bass guitar; music (8, 11, & 12)
- DJ Product ©1969 (Doug Boyce) — turntables, backing vocals; music (8, & 12)
- B.C. (Ben C. Vaught) — drums; music (8, 10-12, & 14)
