= Back 2 Base X =

Studio album by (hed) ^{p.e.}
- Released: June 6, 2006
- Genre: Punk rock
- Length: 45:50
- Label: Suburban Noize
- Producer: Jahred Gomes, Kevin Zinger, Brad Xavier

(hed) ^{p.e.} chronology
Only in Amerika (2004)	Back 2 Base X (2006)	Insomnia (2007)

Singles from Back 2 Base X
- 1. "Get Ready" Released: 2006; 2. "Beware Do We Go" Released: July 18, 2006

Back 2 Base X (written as B∆CK 2 B∆SE X) is the fifth studio album by American rock band Hed PE. Released on June 6, 2006, it is the band's first release on Suburban Noize.

== Music ==
Back 2 Base X was influenced by classic punk bands such as the Sex Pistols and the Clash, and was intended as a return to the basics of rock music, and did not rely as heavily on studio enhancement as previous releases.

== Reception ==
Professional ratings
Review scores
Source	Rating
411Mania	(9/10)
Allmusic	3/5 stars
Melodic.net	3/5 stars
Metal Underground	3/5 stars
musicOMH	1/5 stars

Back 2 Base X peaked at #12 on the Top Independent Albums chart, #154 on the Top Internet Albums Chart and at #154 on the Billboard 200.

Allmusic's Rob Theakston wrote that "Back 2 Base X suffers from the same problems as Amerika: it tries to be conceptual in thought à la Tool and vicious in its political commentary à la Fugazi or System of a Down, but somehow falls short by sounding like an angry stoner on a soapbox. It won't win any new fans, but existing fans of (hed) pe's work won't be turning their backs away from the band in anger anytime soon, either."

== Track listing ==
No.	Title	Writer(s)	Length
1.	"Listen"	Jared Gomes	2:53
2.	"Novus Ordos Clitorus"	Gomes, Jaxon Benge	3:13
3.	"Lock and Load"	Gomes	3:03
4.	"White Collars"	Gomes, Benge	3:22
5.	"Get Ready"	Gomes	2:52
6.	"Sophia"	Gomes, Mark Bistany	3:23
7.	"Peer Pressure"	Gomes	0:44
8.	"Beware Do We Go"	Gomes	3:54
9.	"Daze of War"	Gomes, Benge, Bistany, Doug Boyce, Michael Todd, Mark Young	5:13
10.	"Sweetchops"	Gomes, Benge	3:05
11.	"So It Be"	Gomes	3:57
12.	"Let's Ride"	Gomes, Benge, Bistany, Boyce, Todd, Young	4:08
13.	"The Chosen One"	Gomes, Young	3:18
Total length:			45:50

Japanese Bonus Track
No.	Title	Length
14.	"Night Club in Bali"	2:45

== Personnel ==
(Hed) Planet Earth

- Jahred Gomes – vocals
- Jaxon Benge – guitar
- Doug «DJ Product © 1969» Boyce – turntables
- Mark «Mawk» Young – bass
- Mark «Moke» Bistany – drums

Production

- Produced by Jahred Gomes, Kevin Zinger & Brad Xavier
- Recorded @ Jared's Huntington Beach Apartment
- Mixed & mastered by Patrick «P-Nice» Shevelin
- Additional vocals by The Rabbi Michael Zimmerman (2, 10, 11)
- Additional guitar by Ray Bones (3) & Heath (1)
- Additional bass by Heath (1)
- Additional composer: Michael Todd (9, 12)
- Management by Kevin Zinger
- Art concept by Jahred Gomes
- Artwork & layout design by Larry Love
