= Hed PE =

American rock band

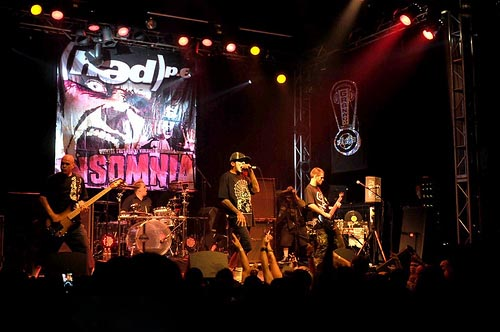
- Hed PE performing in 2008. Left to right: Mawk Young, Tiny Bubz, Jared Gomes, DJ Product © 1969 and Jaxon Benge.

Background information
- Also known as: (həd); (həd) Planet Earth; (həd) ^{p.e.}; (Hed) P.E.
- Origin: Huntington Beach, California, U.S.
- Genres: Rapcore; rap metal; rap rock; nu metal; punk rock
- Years active: 1994–present
- Labels: Jive; Koch; Suburban Noize; Pavement; Cleopatra
- Members: Jared Gomes; Kurt Blankenship; Nathan Javier; Stephen Arango
- Past members: See members section
- Website: hedplanetearth.com

Hed PE (typeset as (həd)^{p.e.}, (hed) Planet Earth, (Hed)pe or (Hed)PE) is an American rock band from Huntington Beach, California. Formed in 1994, the band is known for its eclectic genre-crossing style, predominantly in the fusion of gangsta rap and punk rock it has termed "G-punk", but also for its reggae-fused music.

After releasing three albums on Jive Records, Hed PE left the label to record independently. Hed PE was signed with Suburban Noize Records from 2006 until 2010. Since 2006, the band has become known for its involvement in the 9/11 Truth movement, referencing it in many of their song lyrics and concerts, as well as the concept of the album New World Orphans. Since 2014, the band has been signed with Pavement Music.

To date, Hed PE has released sixteen studio albums, one live album and three compilation albums, and has sold over 700,000 albums worldwide.

== History ==
=== Formation and major-label debut (1994–1999) ===
The band was formed by vocalist Jared Gomes, also known as "M.C.U.D." (MC Underdog), and guitarist Wes Geer, who became friends amidst the Orange County hardcore punk scene. Gomes and Geer recruited guitarist Chizad, bassist Mawk, drummer B.C. Vaught and DJ Product © 1969. They named the group "Hed", which was based on a song written by Gomes called "Heavy Head". The band built a following with their energetic performances at local venues, and released the self-financed extended play, Church of Realities. Legal issues forced Hed to change their name, adding "PE", which stood for "Planetary Evolution (later changed to planet earth) ".

Hed PE signed with Jive Records, releasing their self-titled debut album in 1997. In his review of the album, AllMusic's Steve Huey wrote "There are some slow and/or unfocused moments [...] but overall, its aggression will probably play well with late-'90s metal and punk fans." Due to the label's contractual terms and the disappointing sales of the album, the band found themselves unable to repay the cash advances given to them by Jive. Gomes is quoted as saying "We had these romantic visions of the music industry, and we thought it would be cool to be a punk band on a rap label. So we fulfilled that dream, but it was also probably the worst thing that could have happened. [...] We've had offers from Sony and others that we can't take because we owe Jive so much money."

=== Broke and Blackout (2000–2004) ===
On June 6, 2000, Hed PE appeared on the tribute album Nativity in Black II, covering Black Sabbath's "Sabbra Cadabra". Hed PE released their second studio album, Broke on August 22, 2000. It peaked at No. 63 on the Billboard 200, while its first single, "Bartender", peaked at No. 23 on the Billboard Mainstream Rock Tracks chart and at No. 27 on the Modern Rock Tracks chart. AllMusic's Jason D. Taylor wrote: "Broke may have not found as much success in the competitive mainstream market as some would have liked, and even despite its distinct departure from the group's debut, it is an album that shows more vision than other rap-tinged rock albums to come out in 2000." The most negative response to the album came from critics who viewed its lyrics as misogynistic. Jared Gomes denied that he was sexist in a 2001 Kerrang! magazine feature about sexism in rock music, saying that some of his lyrics were deliberately controversial in order to provoke a reaction from people. He also noted that his lyrics offended other members in Hed PE, but they "live[d] with it".

On October 27, 2000, Gomes was arrested for possession of marijuana while the band was performing in Waterbury, Connecticut. He was released on a US$1,500 bond. In 2001, Hed PE performed on the Ozzfest tour alongside bands such as Korn, Static-X, and System of a Down. A music video for "Killing Time", the second single from Broke, was produced in promotion of the film 3000 Miles to Graceland, which featured the song on its soundtrack.

Hed PE released their third studio album, Blackout, on March 18, 2003. It peaked at No. 33 on the Billboard 200, while its title track peaked at No. 21 on the Mainstream Rock Tracks chart and at No. 32 on the Modern Rock Tracks chart. Allmusic's Johnny Loftus wrote that "While it expands on melodic elements that had previously played a supporting role in the band's sound, Blackout also delivers truckloads of crushing guitar and pounding rhythm. And whether or not it is the presence of a top-line producer, (hed) pe have figured out a way to imbue their aggressive mix of heavy rock and hip-hop with some serious hooks." Guitarist Jaxon joined the band in early 2004. He is the fourth person to fill this position.

=== Only in Amerika (2004) ===
Hed PE left Jive Records, releasing their fourth studio album, Only in Amerika, on Koch Records on October 19, 2004. It peaked at No. 20 on the Top Independent Albums chart and at No. 186 on the Billboard 200. In his review of the album, Johnny Loftus wrote "It wants to be a confrontational megaphone in the ear of conservatives, but Jahred's torrential rhetoric is too messy and blatantly offensive to incite anything but superficial anger, and the music – though occasionally explosive – takes a backseat to the ranting."

=== Suburban Noize Records (2006–2010) ===
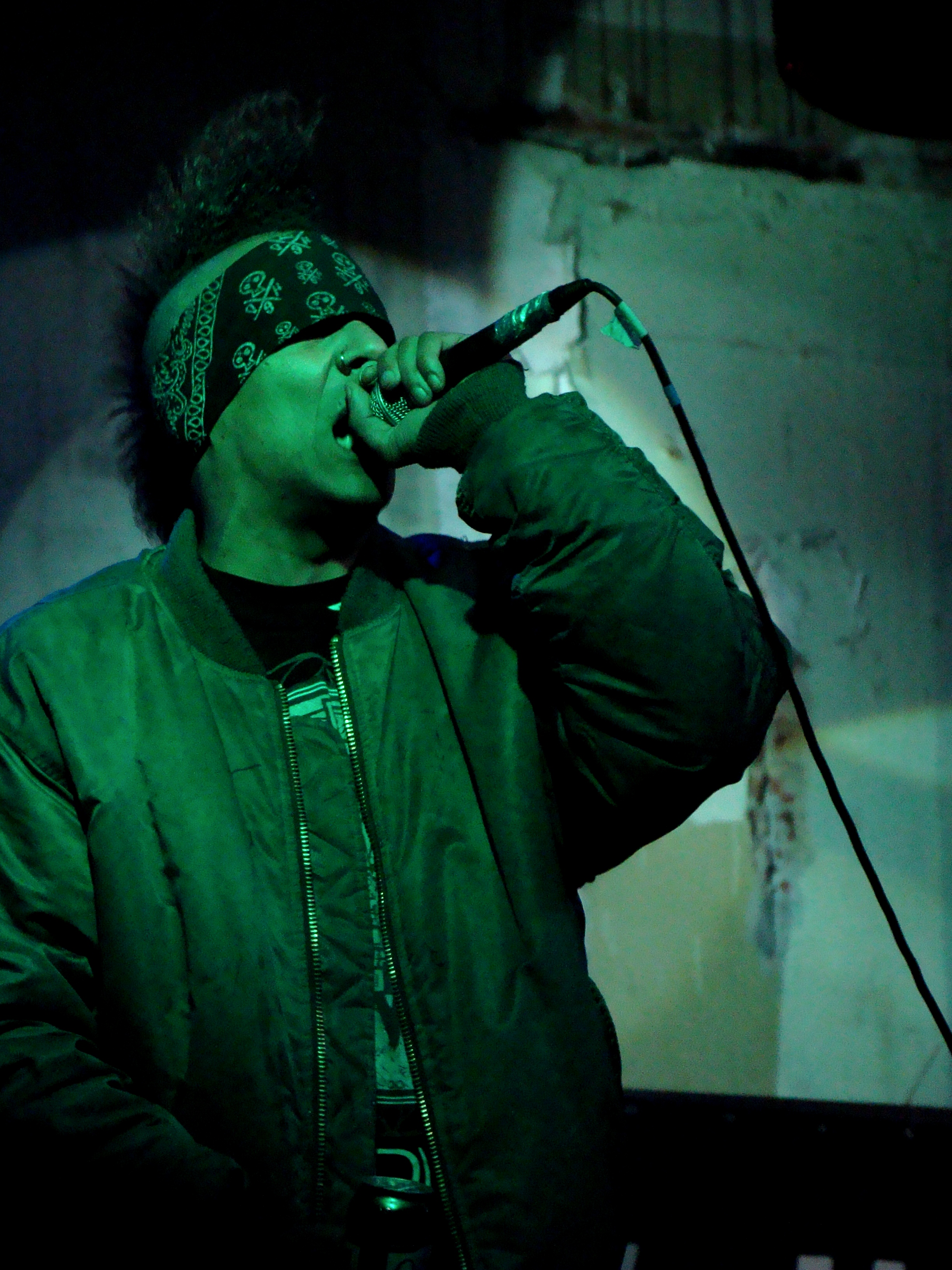
M.C.U.D. with Hed PE in Lviv, Ukraine in 2012

In 2006, Hed PE signed with Suburban Noize Records, recording their fifth studio album, Back 2 Base X. The album was intended as a return to the basics of rock music, and did not rely as heavily on studio enhancement as previous releases. The album was released on June 6, 2006, the same day as The Best of (həd) Planet Earth, a compilation album produced by Jive Records without the band's authorization or consent. Back 2 Base X peaked at No. 12 on the Independent Albums chart, and at No. 154 on the Billboard 200. Allmusic's Rob Theakston wrote that "Back 2 Base X suffers from the same problems as Amerika: it tries to be conceptual in thought à la Tool and vicious in its political commentary à la Fugazi or System of a Down, but somehow falls short by sounding like an angry stoner on a soapbox. It won't win any new fans, but existing fans of (hed) pe's work won't be turning their backs away from the band in anger anytime soon, either."

On June 26, 2007, the band released their sixth studio album, Insomnia. It peaked at No. 16 on the Independent Albums chart, and at No. 138 on the Billboard 200. The album's lead single, "Suffa", became one of the most requested tracks at Sirius Satellite Radio's Hard Attack, while the song's music video was voted one of the Top 10 of 2007 on MTV's Headbangers Ball. Hed PE released their first live album, The D.I.Y. Guys, in 2008. On December 20, 2008, Hed PE released their new single "Renegade" with the drummer Christopher Hendrich who appeared in the music video as well. On January 13, 2009, they released their seventh studio album, New World Orphans. It was released in three different versions; each contains a different set of bonus tracks. In 2009, drummer Trauma joined the band. He is the sixth person to fill this position. The band's eighth studio album, Truth Rising, was released on October 26, 2010, to mixed reviews. It would be the last album the band recorded for Suburban Noize, which Gomes described as having "imploded on itself" approximately around 2010, leaving the band without a label for the next four years.

=== Evolution and Forever! (2014–2019) ===
Hed PE subsequently signed with Pavement Music. In a 2012 interview, frontman Jared Gomes stated that their album for 2013 titled Ascension would be released within the first half of 2014. Towards the end of 2013, DJ Product mysteriously left the band with no explanation and no comment from the other members. On January 1, 2014, Gomes stated on the band's official Facebook that the new upcoming (hed) PE album will be named "Evolution" and to be released within the year.

On May 13, 2014, On the band's official Facebook page, they released the official announcement of when the band's new album Evolution will hit stores. The album is set for release July 22, 2014. They also released a teaser of the tone of the new album on their Facebook page and soon after, the track "One More Body".

In 2015, it was confirmed that 12-year guitarist Jaxon Benge and original bassist Mark Young had left the band. They were replaced by guitarist Greg "Gregzilla" Harrison and bassist Kurt "Kid Bass" Blankenship, leaving vocalist Jared Gomes as the group's only remaining original member.

=== Stampede!, Class of 2020, Sandmine, Califas Worldwide and Detox (2019–present) ===
On June 21, 2019, the band released a new 10-track album titled Stampede!, which was noted for taking a departure from the style of their previous albums through the inclusion of auto-tune on many of the tracks. In August 2020, Hed PE released the album Class of 2020 which was described as a return to the original G-punk sound of the band. The record saw a reunion with original guitarist Chad "Chizad" Benekos for the first time in nearly two decades, who performed in the song "Greedy Girl". Original member DJ Product © 1969 also returned to play on the album as well as create the artwork for the record which was a throwback to their album Broke to celebrate the 20th anniversary of its release. On May 7, 2021, the band announced the extended play Sandmine, which was released on July 23, 2021. A lyric video accompanied the release, created by Eitan Melody from EITANS DESIGNS and featuring artwork by Remy Dovianus. On October 22 of the same year, the band announced the studio album Califas Worldwide, which was released on December 17, 2021. For the 20th anniversary of Broke, on April 8, 2022, the band released "Bartenders", a remake of "Bartender" featuring Dropout Kings and DJ Lethal. On October 14, 2022, the band released a rerecorded version of their song "Let's Ride" with Madchild for a deluxe edition of their album "Back 2 Base X". On February 5, 2023, the band released a cover of the Ramones song "I Wanna Be Sedated". During that same year, Hed PE released three singles, "Detox", "Too Late" and "Waiting", from their next studio album Detox, due on December 15, 2023. The band's next album New and Improved, a collection of song covers and re-recordings of "Bartender" and "Raise Hell", was released on May 30, 2025. They co-headlined Michigan Metal Fest in August of that year with Chelsea Grin and Hatebreed.

== Style ==
=== Music and lyrics ===
Hed PE performs a style of music which they have referred to as "G-punk", a phrase inspired by the term "G-funk". Hed PE has also described its music as "schizophrenic". Hed PE's music is a fusion of styles ranging from hip hop, reggae, and ska to hard rock, punk, and heavy metal. Jared Gomes' vocal style ranges from melodic singing to rapping, screaming, and death growls. The band's lyrics draw on a number of subjects, including social justice, the existence of extraterrestrial life, criticism of organized religion, the 9/11 Truth movement, cannabis use and sexual intercourse.

Gomes, in addition to the 9/11 Truth movement, has expressed support for social liberal politicians such as Nancy Pelosi and president Barack Obama. However, Gomes' 2004 lyrics for Only in Amerika supported American nationalism, and called for brutal retaliation against Al Qaeda for the 9/11 terrorist attacks.

=== Influences ===
The band's influences include Beastie Boys, Black Sabbath, Bob Marley, Led Zeppelin, Nine Inch Nails, Notorious B.I.G. and Rage Against the Machine.

Hed PE's second album, Broke, incorporated classic rock and world music influences, while Back 2 Base X was influenced by classic punk bands such as the Sex Pistols and The Clash, Insomnia was influenced by thrash metal bands such as Slayer, and New World Orphans was influenced by Suicidal Tendencies and Minor Threat. Guitarist Jaxon has been credited for encouraging a heavier, hardcore punk-influenced musical style.

== Band members ==
=== Current members ===
- Jared "M.C.U.D." Gomes – lead vocals, melodica (1994–present)
- Kurt "Kid Bass" Blankenship – bass (2015–present)
- Nathan Javier – guitar (2021–present)
- Stephen Arango – drums (2024–present)

=== Former members ===
- Mark "Mawk" Young – bass (1994–2015)
- Doug "DJ Product © 1969" Boyce – turntables, samples, melodica, backing vocals (1994–2013, 2019, 2024)
- Chad "Chizad" Benekos – guitar, backing vocals (1994–2002, 2020)
- Wesley "Wesstyle" Geer – guitar (1994–2003)
- Ben "B.C." Vaught – drums (1994–2003)
- Ken "The Finger" Sachs – keyboards (1994–1996)
- Sonny Mayo – guitar (2002–2003)
- Jackson "Jaxon" Benge – guitar (2004–2015)
- Christopher Hendrich – drums (2004)
- Mark "Moke" Bistany – drums (2004–2006)
- Devin Lebsack – drums (2006–2007)
- Anthony "Tiny Bubz" Biuso (Tiny Bubz) – (2007–2008)
- Jeremiah "Trauma" Stratton – drums, backing vocals (2009–2024)
- Greg "Gregzilla" Harrison – guitar (2015–2017)
- Will Von Arx – guitar (2017–2018)
- D.J. Blackard – guitar (2018–2021)

== Discography ==
Studio albums

- Hed PE (1997)
- Broke (2000)
- Blackout (2003)
- Only in Amerika (2004)
- Back 2 Base X (2006)
- Insomnia (2007)
- New World Orphans (2009)
- Truth Rising (2010)
- Evolution (2014)
- Forever! (2016)
- Stampede (2019)
- Class of 2020 (2020)
- Califas Worldwide (2022)
- Detox (2023)
- Relapse (2026)

Cover albums

- 70's Hits From the Pit (2023)
- New and Improved (2025)
