= Shwayze discography =

- Studio albums: 5
- Singles: 8
- Music videos: 14
- Mixtapes: 4
- Collaborations: 8

Shwayze, an American rapper, has released five studio albums and eight singles. On August 19, 2008, Shwayze released his self-titled debut album, Shwayze. The album had two singles on it, "Buzzin'" and "Corona and Lime". On October 27, 2009, his second studio album, Let It Beat, was released.

== Albums ==
Year	Information	Chart positions				Certifications
Year	Information	U.S.	U.S. R&B	U.S. Rap	CAN	Certifications
2008	Shwayze: First studio album; Released: August 19, 2008	10	5	3	92	Sales: 135,262+
2009	Let It Beat: Second studio album; Released: November 3, 2009	55	—	3	—	Sales: 10,764+
2011	Island in the Sun: Third studio album; Released: September 13, 2011	118	—	13	—	Sales: —
2013	Shwayze Summer: Fourth studio album; Released: July 14, 2013	—	—	—	—	Sales: —
2019	Beach Boy: Fifth studio album; Released: July 19, 2019	—	—	—	—	Sales: —
2020	Surf Trap: Sixth studio album; Released: July 17, 2020	—	—	—	—	Sales: —
2022	Shwayze SZN: Seventh studio album; Released: September 2, 2022	—	—	—	—	Sales: —

=== Shwayze Summer ===
The album Shwayze Summer was released on July 14, 2013. Its first single for the album was "Love is Overrated" produced by Paul Couture. This is Shwayze's first full-length debut album as a solo artist without his previous singer Cisco Adler. Shwayze stated in an interview that they both needed a musical break from each other, but they are still on good terms. The album contains 12 tracks and features The Cataracs, Tayyib Ali, Devin K, Paul Couture, Ferrari Snowday, Marco and Austin Paul.

== Singles ==
Year	Title	Chart Positions					Album
Year	Title	US	AUT	CAN	GER	SUI	Album
2008	"Buzzin'"	46	45	80	31	63	Shwayze
2008	"Corona and Lime"	23	—	—	—	—	Shwayze
2009	"Get U Home"	—	—	—	—	—	Let It Beat
2011	"Love Letter" (featuring The Cataracs and Dev)	—	—	—	—	—	Love Stoned
2011	"You Could Be My Girl"	—	—	—	—	—	Island in the Sun
2011	"Drunk Off Your Love" (featuring Sky Blu of LMFAO)	—	—	—	—	—	Island in the Sun
2013	"Love Is Overrated"	—	—	—	—	—	Shwayze Summer
2014	"Kick It" (featuring Ferrari Snowday)	—	—	—	—	—	Shwayze Summer
"—" denotes releases that did not chart

== Mixtapes ==
- Rich Girls (2008)
- Love Stoned (2010)
- The W's (2011)
- Greatest Hits You've Never Heard (2014)

== EPs ==
- Shwayzed & Confused (EP) (2012)
- King of the Summer (EP) (2015)

== Music videos ==
=== Shwayze Music Videos ===
Year	Title	Director(s)
2008	"Hollywood"	Shaw
2008	"Buzzin'"	Robert Hales; Alison Foster
2008	"Corona and Lime"	Shane Drake; Brandon Bonfiglio
2009	"Rock n' Roll"	Nicholaus Goossen
2009	"Get U Home"	Stewart Hendler
2009	"Crazy for You"	Stewart Hendler
2010	"Said It All Before"	Michael Easterling
2010	"Can't Do It Alone"	Michael Easterling
2010	"Said It All Before (Rock Version)"	Michael Easterling
2011	"Love Letter"	Michael Easterling
2011	"You Could Be My Girl"	Michael Easterling
2011	"Drunk Off Your Love" (featuring Sky Blu)	Michael Easterling; Talkboy TV
2013	"Love Is Overrated"	Sean M. Flynn
2014	"Kick It" (featuring Ferrari Snowday)	Michael Easterling; Talkboy TV

=== Video Appearances ===
Year	Title	Artist	Director(s)
2007	"1980"	Dirt Nasty	Nicholaus Goossen
2007	"Bender"	Andre Legacy	Nicholaus Goossen

== Guest appearances ==
- Moses Stone – Gone (feat. Shwayze & Hero DeLano)
- Cisco Adler – Motorcycle (feat. Shwayze & Mickey Avalon)
- Cisco Adler – Stick Up (feat. Shwayze)
- Cisco Adler – Cheap Champagne (feat. Shwayze)
- The All-American Rejects – Gives You Hell Remix (feat. Shwayze)
- Paradiso Girls – Patron Tequila Remix (feat. Shwayze)
- Keely Julian – No Chaser (feat. Shwayze)
- Pittsburgh Slim – Undressed (feat. Shwayze)
- Dr. Hollywood – Breakfast at Tiffany's (feat. Shwayze)
- Cisco Adler – California Girl (feat. Shwayze)
- Cisco Adler – High High High (feat. Shwayze)
- CIsco Adler – More Than a Fan (feat. Shwayze)
- Hoodie Allen – Wave Goodbye (feat. Shwayze)
- Sky Blu - Pop Bottles (feat. Mark Rosas)
- Mark Rosas - Reaction (feat. Chelsea Korka)
