= Love letter (disambiguation) =

A love letter is a romantic way to express feelings of love in written form.

Love Letter(s) or The Love Letter may also refer to:

== Film and television ==
=== Film ===
- Love Letters (1917 film), an American drama silent film
- Love Letters (1924 film), an American melodrama film directed by David Selman (as David Soloman)
- Love Letters (1942 film), a French film directed by Claude Autant-Lara
- Love Letters (1945 film), an American film directed by William Dieterle
- Love Letters (1970 film), a Philippine film directed by Abraham Cruz and starring Vilma Santos
- Love Letters (1983 film), an American film starring Jamie Lee Curtis
- Love Letters (1988 film), a Philippine anthology film starring Lotlot de Leon, Kristina Paner and Manilyn Reynes
- Love Letters (1999 film), an American television film directed by Stanley Donen
- Love Letters (2025 film), a French drama film directed by Alice Douard
- Love Letter (1953 film), a Japanese film directed by Kinuyo Tanaka
- Love Letter (1959 film), a Japanese film directed by Seijun Suzuki
- Love Letter (1975 film), an Indian Malayalam-language romance film by Dr. Balakrishnan
- Love Letter (1985 film), a Japanese film directed by Tatsumi Kumashiro
- Love Letter (1995 film), a Japanese film directed by Shunji Iwai
- Love Letter (1998 film), a Japanese film starring Mitsuko Baisho
- The Love Letter (1998 film), a Hallmark Hall of Fame television film directed by Dan Curtis
- The Love Letter (1999 film), an American romantic comedy directed by Peter Chan
- Basheer's Love Letter, a 2017 Indian Malayalam-language romantic film by Aneesh Anwar starring Farhaan Faasil and Sana Althaf
- Premalekha (lit. 'Love Letter'), a 1952 Indian Malayalam-language romantic film by M. K. Ramani, starring Jose Prakash and S. P. Pillai
- Premalekhanam (film) (transl. The Love Letter), a 1985 Indian Malayalam-language film based on the novel by Basheer (see below)
- Prema Lekhalu (lit. 'Love Letter'), a 1977 Indian Telugu-language drama film by K. Raghavendra Rao
- Prem Patra (lit. 'Love Letter'), a 1962 Indian Hindi-language romantic-drama film by Bimal Roy, starring Shashi Kapoor and Sadhana Shivdasani

=== Television ===
- Love Letter (TV series), a 2003 Korean television drama
- Love Letter (game show), a 2004–2006 Korean television variety show
- "Love Letters", an episode of Steven Universe

== Music ==
=== Albums ===
- Love Letter (Ai Otsuka album), and the title song, 2008
- Love Letter (Azu album), and the title song, 2012
- Love Letter (Gackt album), and the title song (see below), 2005
- Love Letter (Jessie Farrell album), and the title song, 2011
- Love Letter (Miyuki Nakajima album), and the title song, 2003
- Love Letter (R. Kelly album), and the title song, 2010
- Love Letter (Sajjad Ali album), and the title song, 1990
- Love Letter (3776 album), 2014
- Love Letters (Julie London album), and the title song, 1962
- Love Letters (Leslie Satcher album), 2002
- Love Letters (Metronomy album), 2014
- Love Letters (The Boss album), 2012
- Love Letters, 2014 album by André Rieu
- Love Letters / رسائل حب, 2025 EP by Saint Levant
- Love Letters, 2001 album by William Galison

=== Songs ===
- "Love Letter" (Berry Good song), 2014
- "Love Letter" (BoA song), 2007
- "Love Letter" (Gackt song), 2006
- "Love Letter" (Nick Cave and the Bad Seeds song), 2001
- "Love Letters" (song), theme of the 1945 film (see above), hit vocal version by Dick Haymes (1945), covered by Ketty Lester (1961) and Alison Moyet (1987)
- "Loveletter" (Yoasobi song), 2021
- "Love Letter", by the Blue Hearts from Train-Train
- "Love Letter", by Bonnie Raitt from Nick of Time
- "Love Letter", by Julie Ruin (Kathleen Hanna) from Julie Ruin
- "Love Letter", by Leona Lewis from Echo
- "Love Letter", by Loona from JinSoul
- "Love Letter", by Nina Nesbitt from The Sun Will Come Up, the Seasons Will Change
- "Love Letter", by Shinhwa from Winter Story
- "Love Letter", by Shwayze
- "Love Letter", by Stan Rogers from From Coffee House to Concert Hall, 1999
- "Love Letters", by Miranda Lambert from Crazy Ex-Girlfriend

== Others ==
- Sapit, a traditional kueh, also known as love letters
- Biscuit roll, a crunchy and brittle biscuit snack, also known as love letters
- The Love Letter (Vermeer), a painting by Johannes Vermeer
- Love Letters (play), a 1988 play by A. R. Gurney
- Love Letters (novel), by Katie Fforde
- The Love Letters (novel) or Love Letters, a 1966 novel by Madeleine L'Engle
- LoveLetter or ILOVEYOU, a 2000 computer worm
- Love Letter (card game), a 2012 card game of Japanese origin
- Premalekhanam (transl. The Love Letter, a Malayalam-language novel by Indian writer Vaikom Muhammed Basheer

== See also ==
- Love & Letter, an album by Seventeen, 2016
