= Cherie Roberts =

American artist and model

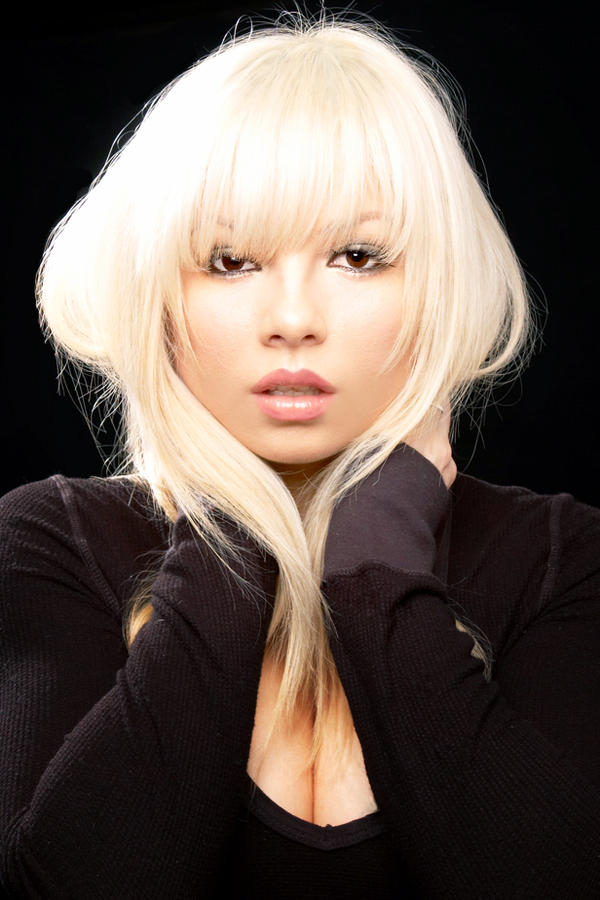
- Roberts in 2008

Background Information
- Also known as: Kitana Jade
- Born: December 8, 1978 (age 47); Oakland, California
- Origin: San Jose, California
- Occupation(s): model, photographer, web designer, make-up artist, webmaster, writer
- Years active: 1999–present
- Height: 5 ft 3 in (1.60 m)
- Weight: 110 lbs
- Hair color: Blond
- Eye color: Brown
- Modeling website: www.cherieroberts.com
- Photography website: www.croberts.net

Cherie Roberts (born December 8, 1978, in Oakland, California), aka Kitana Jade, is a model and photographer who worked with Playboy in the early to mid-2000s, modeled for numerous magazines and websites, and toured with Hot Import Nights car shows from 2000 to 2006.

Roberts was born to a father of Irish, British, and German descent and a mother of Vietnamese, French and Chinese descent. She was raised in San Jose, California, with her younger sister and older brother. She was an exotic dancer in San Francisco when she was discovered by a local company to model for a bikini calendar. In 2000, Roberts modeled for several Playboy Special Edition issues, and created her own website which she designed and maintained on her own. In 2001, Roberts moved to Hollywood after she was crowned Miss Hot Import Nights 2001. She toured with the company for several years, making dozens of appearances across the US. Roberts was featured in several import car scene DVDs and in the racing video game, Street Racing Syndicate. She was also one of the early adopters of social networking site, MySpace, where her page quickly became one of the most trafficked pages on the site, establishing Roberts as an early MySpace celebrity.

In 2005, Roberts created a second website for her photography, and began actively shooting photography for Suicide Girls. Since then, she is best known for shooting glamour and nude photography for several companies, including gaming sites UGO.com and IGN.com and alternative culture community site, EvilHearts.com. In 2007, she shot a calendar featuring nude models and vintage video game consoles for a company called Nerdcore. She followed up the 2007 Nerdcore calendar with the 2008 Nerdcore calendar featuring nude models shot as superheroes and villains which Maxim magazine dubbed "The Sexiest Calendar in 2008" in their February 2008 US issue. In 2009 and 2010, Roberts continued her work with Nerdcore by putting out a sci-fi themed calendar in 2009 and a horror-themed calendar in 2010. In 2011, Roberts teamed up with Penthouse (magazine) and THQ to create downloadable content for their video game, Saints Row: The Third. Roberts shot several of Penthouse's most popular models, and THQ used the images to create bonus characters and stories to be used for the downloadable "Penthouse Pack" content. Roberts' work is also regularly published in BPM magazine, in a monthly feature. In addition to her glamour and nude photography, Roberts has also shot various celebrities and bands.

As of 2011, Roberts continued to pursue her photography career, write articles, and maintain her websites.

== Bands and celebrities photographed by Roberts ==
- Danny McBride (actor)
- My Chemical Romance
- Deftones
- AFI (band) members Davey Havok, Jade Puget and Hunter Burgan
- Good Charlotte
- Puscifer (solo project of Maynard James Keenan of Tool and A Perfect Circle fame)
- Mark Hoppus of Blink 182 and Pete Wentz of Fall Out Boy
- Jimmy Eat World
- Taryn Manning (actor)
- Justin Theroux (actor)
- The All-American Rejects
- The Boondock Saints II: All Saints Day cast members (Sean Patrick Flanery, Norman Reedus, Clifton Collins, Jr., Julie Benz, and writer/director Troy Duffy)
- Serj Tankian of System of a Down
- Kristina and Karissa Shannon of Playboy's The Girls Next Door
- Puddle of Mudd members Wes Scantlin and Ryan Yerdon
- Buckcherry members Josh Todd and Keith Nelson
- The Smashing Pumpkins and Hole bassist Melissa Auf der Maur
- Against Me! lead singer Laura Jane Grace
- Shwayze and Cisco Adler of MTV's Buzzin' (TV series)
- Wolfmother lead singer Andrew Stockdale
- Foxy Shazam
- Caroline D' Amore (actor)
- IGN host Jessica Chobot
- Jordan Zevon (musician)

== Modeling appearances in magazines ==
- Showgirls Magazine, November 2000 cover and feature
- Showgirls Magazine, January 2001 centerfold pull-out
- Super Street, March 2001 cover and feature
- Playboy's College Girls Spring 2001 feature
- Import Tuner, May 2001 cover and feature
- Lowrider Euro, June/July 2001 cover and feature
- Playboy's Sexy College Girls September 2001 feature
- Penthouse, Australia, 2001 feature
- Hustler, catalog volume 2.1 featured model
- Auto, Sound and Security, August 2002 cover and feature
- Card Player, volume 15, #February 4, 2002 cover with Larry Flynt
- Looker, May 2003 feature
- Leg Sex, June 2003 cover and feature
- Playboy, July 2003 2 Fast 2 Furious 2 Fine feature
- Leg Show, October 2003 feature
- Lowrider Euro, October/November 2003 cover and feature

== Video and DVD appearances ==
- 360 Video Hard Drive DVD Star Feature
- 360 Video Best of 360 Video DVD Feature
- 360 Video Deleted Scenes DVD Star Feature
- Blue Slate Entertainment Import Covergirls Volume 1 DVD Star Feature
- Hip-Hop Honeys Blazin' Asians DVD Feature
- Hot Body Video Magazine Bare Brunettes DVD Feature
- Peach DVD Here Comes The Judge DVD Feature
- Peach DVD Road Strip DVD Feature
- Peach DVD Invitation Only DVD Feature
- Mystique's Hottest Buns and Best Legs DVD Feature
- Mystique presents H2ohh DVD Feature
- Mystique DVD Stripped and Outrageous Web Chicks DVD Feature
- Mystique's Asian Beauties Exposed DVD Feature
- JMH Productions Just Eighteen DVD Star Feature
- JMH Productions Hawaiian Fantasies DVD Feature
- EEB Productions Exotic Erotic Ball DVD Feature
