= Buzzin' =

Bizzin' may refer to:

- Buzzin', a 2001 album by The Vibrators
- "Buzzin'" (Mann song), a 2010 song by American hip hop artist Mann
- "Buzzin'" (Shwayze song), the 2008 first single by American alternative hip hop artist Shwayze
- Buzzin' (TV series), a 2008 show about musicians Cisco Adler and Shwayze

== See also ==
- Sebastiano Buzzin (1929–2007), Italian footballer
- Buzz (disambiguation)
