= Azu =

Japanese R&B singer (born 1981)

- Born: December 8, 1981 (age 44); Tsu, Mie, Japan
- Genres: Pop, R&B
- Occupation: Singer
- Years active: 1997–present
- Label: BMG Japan (2006–2009) Ariola Japan (2009–present)
- Website: www.sonymusic.co.jp/Music/Info/azu/

Azu (born December 8, 1981) is a Japanese R&B singer. She is well known for her collaborations with rapper Seamo, such as her first major release, the leading track from Seamo's second album Live Goes On, "Kokoro no Koe".

== Biography ==
Azu first began working in the Tokyo club scene at the age of 16. She explains the meaning behind her stage name as "Putting memories to all the words from A to Z and conveying them to you (U)." She began work with rapper Seamo in 2005, and worked as a background vocalist for a few of his tracks. In 2006, she featured as a fully fledged billed artist in the lead radio single from his second album, Live Goes On. The song, "Kokoro no Koe", was certified by the RIAJ for 100,000 cellphone downloads.

She debuted as an artist in her own right in 2007, with the single "Cherish". "Cherish" is used as the ending theme in the xxxHolic Shunmuki original video animation series. She continued to work with Seamo (for example, her first top 30 hit, "Jikan yo Tomare", featured him). To date, the pair have worked together on six songs together. "Jikan yo Tomare" is used as the second ending in the Itazura na Kiss anime series.

Her songs generally do better in the digital market (her biggest single in physical sales only sold 11,000 copies). Since November 2009, five of her songs have been certified gold by the RIAJ for cellphone downloads.

Azu released her second album in March 2010, Two of Us. Azu's single "For You" is used as the 12th ending theme for Naruto Shippuden. Azu's single "In My Life" is used as the third ending theme for Yorinuki Gintama-san. Azu composed the song "Akatsuki no Hana" for Akatsuki no Yona.

Azu announced her marriage to a man outside the music industry in May 2017, and she gave birth to a daughter on August 6, 2018.

== Discography ==
=== Albums ===
| Year | Album Information | Chart positions | Total sales |
|---|---|---|---|
| 2008 | As One: Released: July 23, 2008; Label: BMG Japan (BVCR 14041); Formats: CD, digital download | 35 | 18,036 |
| 2010 | Two of Us: Released: March 17, 2010; Label: Ariola Japan (BVCL 85); Formats: CD, digital download | 13 | 22,427 |
| 2011 | AZyoU: Released: February 23, 2011; Label: Ariola Japan (BVCL 197–198); Formats: CD, digital download | 15 | 9,743 |
| 2012 | Love Letter: Released: January 18, 2012; Label: Ariola Japan (BVCL 303–304); Formats: CD, digital download | 22 | 8,137 |
| 2012 | Best: Released: October 31, 2012; Label: Ariola Japan (BVCL 435–436); Formats: CD, digital download | 14 | 8,201 |
| 2014 | 4seasons: Released: January 29, 2014; Label: Ariola Japan (BVCL-565–566); Formats: CD, digital download | 43 | |

=== Singles ===
| Release | Title | Chart positions | | | Oricon sales total | Album |
| Release | Title | Oricon Singles Charts | Billboard Japan Hot 100* | RIAJ Digital Track Chart* | Oricon sales total | Album |
|---|---|---|---|---|---|---|
| 2007 | "Cherish" | 49 | – | – | 5,135 | As One |
| 2007 | "Jewel Sky" | 84 | – | – | 1,525 | As One |
| 2008 | "Koi Iro" (コイイロ, Color of Love) | 118 | 18 | – | 1,055 | As One |
| 2008 | "Jikan yo Tomare feat. Seamo" (時間よ止まれ, Stop Time) | 27 | – | – | 11,157 | As One |
| 2009 | "Imasugu ni..." (いますぐに..., Right Now) | 23 | – | – | 11,270 | Two of Us |
| 2009 | "I Will" | 23 | – | 11 | 6,284 | Two of Us |
| 2009 | "Onaji Sora Mitsumeteru Anata ni" (同じ空みつめてるあなたに, To You, Staring at the Same Sky) (Spontania feat. Azu) | 31 | — | 4 | 5,326 | Collaborations Best!! |
| 2010 | "You & I" feat. Love Love Love | 55 | 38 | 3 | 3,247 | Two of Us |
| 2010 | "For You" | 38 | 53 | 9 | 2,933 | Two of Us |
| 2010 | "Tashika na Koto" (たしかなこと, Important Things) | 67 | — | — | 2,061 | AZyoU |
| 2010 | "In My Life / To You..." | 62 | — | — | 3,324 | AZyoU |
| 2011 | "Broken Heart" | 79 | — | — | — | AZyoU |
| 2011 | "Tomodachi☆★" (トモダチ☆★, Friend☆★) | 100 | — | — | 796 | Love Letter |
| 2011 | "Woman" | 130 | — | — | 620 | Love Letter |
| 2013 | "Promise" | 99 | — | — | — | 4seasons |
| 2013 | "Circles of Life / Summer Time!!!" | 143 | — | — | — | 4seasons |

* Japan Hot 100 established February 2008, RIAJ Digital Track Chart established April 2009.

=== Other appearances ===
| Release | Artist | Title | Notes | Album |
|---|---|---|---|---|
| 2005 | Seamo | Honey Honey | Background vocals. | Drive (single) |
| 2005 | Seamo | "Intro: Here Comes the Seamo" | Background vocals. | Get Back on Stage |
| 2006 | Seamo feat. Azu | "Kokoro no Koe" (心の声, Voice of the Heart) | Lead track from album. PV filmed. | Live Goes On |
| 2008 | Karutetto feat. Azu | "Itsumademo" (いつまでも, Forever) | | Haikei, Boku no Mirai e. (single) |
| 2008 | Makai feat. Azu & L-Vokal | "Baby Star" | | Stars |
| 2008 | Seamo feat. Azu & Yukako | "Kiss Kiss Kiss" | | Scrap & Build |
| 2010 | Makai feat. Azu | "Mata Aitakute" (また会いたくて, I Still Miss You) | Lead track from album. #40 RIAJ. | Love Lite |
| 2010 | S'capade feat. Azu | "Every 4 U" | | |
