= Two of Us (Azu album) =

Studio album by Azu
- Released: 17 March 2010

Azu chronology
As One (2008)	Two of Us (2010)	AZyoU (2011)

Two of Us is the second studio album by Azu, released on 17 March 2010. "Happily Ever After" was used as the ending theme song for the TV program Ousama no Brunch. The album reached #13 on the Oricon weekly charts and charted for nine weeks.

== Catalog number ==
BVCL-83/4 (limited edition)
BVCL-85 (regular edition)

== Track listing ==
CD

1. Intro from Radio 13
2. Hot like Fire
3. Happily Ever After
4. Ima Sugu ni... (いますぐに…; Right Now...)
5. Anata ni Aitakute featuring Spontania (あなたに愛たくて; I Want to Meet You)
6. For You
7. Beautiful Dreamer
8. Oh Baby featuring Kusakawa Shun
9. I Will
10. You & I featuring LOVE LOVE LOVE
11. Love Groovin' featuring KURO (from HOME MADE Kazoku)
12. Onegai! (おねがい!; Please!) (AZU-ko Sensei featuring SEAMO-kun)
13. What Girls Want
14. Letter... ~Taisetsu na Hito e~ (letter... ~大切なひとへ~)

DVD

1. "As One" music videos
  1. Cherish
  2. Jewel Sky
  3. Koiiro (コイイロ; Color of Love)
  4. Jikan yo Tomare featuring SEAMO (時間よ止まれ; Stop Time)
  5. Rainbow
2. Mobile Music DOR@MO "I Will" (alternative ending)
3. AZU TV (making and offshoot)

== Charts ==
Chart	Peak position
Oricon Daily Chart	9
Oricon Weekly Chart	13

Total reported sales: 22,427
