= Island in the Sun =

Island in the Sun may refer to:

- Island in the Sun, a nickname for the island of Sri Lanka.
- Island in the Sun (novel), a 1955 novel by Alec Waugh
- Island in the Sun (film), a 1957 film adapted from the novel by Alec Waugh
  - "Island in the Sun" (Harry Belafonte song), a song by Harry Belafonte, which was the theme tune to the 1957 film
- Island in the Sun (album), an album by Shwayze
- "Island in the Sun" (Weezer song), a 2001 song by Weezer
- Island in the Sun, a.k.a. Johnny's Island, an unreleased album by Neil Young
- "Island in the Sun," a song by Alcatrazz from their 1983 album No Parole from Rock 'n' Roll
- "Island in the Sun," a song by Ringo Starr from his 2015 album Postcards from Paradise

== See also ==
- Sun Island (disambiguation)
