= Sun Island =

Sun Island may refer to:

- Sun Island, one of two main exhibition areas for the Harbin International Ice and Snow Sculpture Festival
- Isla del Sol (Sun Island), an island in Lake Titicaca, Bolivia.
- Usedom, a Baltic Sea island between Germany and Poland nicknamed "Sun Island" (German: Sonneninsel, Polish: Wyspa Słońca)

== See also ==
- Island in the Sun (disambiguation)
