= Mickey Avalon (album) =

Studio album by Mickey Avalon
- Released: October 31, 2006
- Genres: Hip hop, rap rock
- Length: 43:01
- Labels: Shoot to Kill; MySpace; Interscope
- Producers: Aaron Harris; Cisco Adler; Dave Cooley; Dirt Nasty; DJ Ill Media; Giuseppe Patanè; Sunny Levine; Tim Anderson

Mickey Avalon chronology
Mickey Avalon (2006)	Shoot to Kill (2008)

Singles from Mickey Avalon
- 1. "Jane Fonda" Released: 2006; 2. "Mr. Right" Released: 2007

Professional ratings
Review scores
Source	Rating
AllMusic	2.5/5 stars
Now	1/5 Ns
PopMatters	8/10
RapReviews	1.5/10
Robert Christgau	(choice cut)

Mickey Avalon is the self-titled debut solo studio album by American rapper Mickey Avalon. It was originally released in 2005 through Shoot to Kill Music and re-released on October 31, 2006 via MySpace Records in association with Shoot to Kill/Interscope Records.

Production was handled by Aaron Harris, Cisco Adler, Dave Cooley, Giuseppe Patanè, Sunny Levine, Dirt Nasty, DJ Ill Media and Tim Anderson. It features guest appearances from Andre Legacy and Dirt Nasty, with cameo appearances from Camille Vizzi, John Sinclair and Wayne Kramer.

Avalon describes the album as "a glam rap record about Hollywood's seedy underbelly and the ugliness of my own life".

The popularity of the hidden track "My Dick" eclipsed that of the album itself, due to its being featured in Harold & Kumar Escape from Guantanamo Bay and The Rebound, as well as the TV series Hung and American Dad!. The song's lyrics are a series of humorous similes which favourably contrast the rappers' penises with that of another (unspecified) person. "My Dick" also inspired the response track "My Vag", the breakout song of rapper and actress Awkwafina.

"Jane Fonda" was featured briefly in an episode of Entourage and the films The Rebound and I Hope They Serve Beer in Hell. The single was a minor success in the US Billboard Alternative Songs chart, peaking at No. 36.

== Track listing ==
No.	Title	Writer(s)	Producer(s)	Length
1.	"Waiting to Die" (featuring Wayne Kramer and John Sinclair)	Yeshe Perl; Damon Edge; Helios Creed	Dave Cooley	4:01
2.	"So Rich, So Pretty" (featuring Camille Vizzi)	Perl	Giuseppe Patanè; Sunny Levine	3:26
3.	"Jane Fonda"	Perl	Cisco Adler	3:40
4.	"Roll the Dice"	Perl	Giuseppe Patanè; Sunny Levine	3:44
5.	"Mr. Right"	Perl	Cisco Adler	2:52
6.	"Hustler Hall of Fame"	Perl	Aaron Harris	3:28
7.	"Roll Up Your Sleeves"	Perl; Alan Maman; Albert Johnson; Galt MacDermot	Aaron Harris	3:40
8.	"Friends and Lovers"	Perl	DJ Ill Media	2:37
9.	"Dipped in Vaseline"	Perl	Tim Anderson	3:09
10.	"Romeo and Juliet"	Perl	Dave Cooley	4:00
69.	"My Dick (Tribute to Nate)" (featuring Dirt Nasty and Andre Legacy)	Perl; Simon Rex Cutright; Armen Melik	Dirt Nasty	3:00
Total length:				43:01

Notes

- Tracks 11–68 contains silence each lasting for roughly 4 seconds.

Sample credits

- Track 1 contains excerpts from "Static Gravity" written by Helios Creed and Damon Edge and performed by Chrome.
- Track 7 contains elements of "Keep It Thoro" written by Alan Maman and Albert Johnson and performed by Prodigy and "Mass in F" written by Galt MacDermot.

== Personnel ==
- Richard "Segal" Huredia – engineering, mixing
- Brian "Big Bass" Gardner – mastering
- Kevin Wolff – executive producer, management
- Corin Nemec – cover photo
