= Shwayze (album) =

Studio album by Shwayze
- Released: August 19, 2008
- Recorded: 2006–2008; Bannabeat Studios (Malibu, California)
- Genre: Alternative hip hop
- Length: 52:25
- Label: Suretone
- Producer: Jordan Schur (exec.); Cisco Adler; DJ Skeet Skeet

Shwayze chronology
Shwayze (2008)	Let It Beat (2009)

Singles from Shwayze
- 1. "Buzzin'" Released: May 21, 2008; 2. "Corona and Lime" Released: July 23, 2008

Professional ratings
Aggregate scores
Source	Rating
Metacritic	39/100
Review scores
Source	Rating
Allmusic	1.5/5 stars
Entertainment Weekly	D+
Rolling Stone	2.5/5 stars
Spin Magazine	2/5 stars
USA Today	2.5/4 stars

Shwayze is the debut album of American rapper Aaron Smith, better known as Shwayze, released through Suretone Records on August 19, 2008. While Smith wrote the lyrics for the songs, Cisco Adler is credited for production, as well as cowriting the entire album. The first single off the album is "Buzzin'", followed by "Corona and Lime". The album has only one feature, coming from guitarist Dave Navarro, at the end of the song "Flashlight". There is also a hidden track, that is #69 on the CD, entitled "High Together". Smith and Adler released a mixtape shortly after this album, entitled "Rich Girls" that is available as a free download. The album debuted at #10 on the Billboard 200 with 47,000 copies sold in the first week.

== Track listing ==
No.	Title	Writer(s)	Producer(s)	Length
1.	"Roamin"	A. Smith; C. Adler	Cisco Adler	3:37
2.	"Lazy Days"	C. Adler; Y. Pearle	Cisco Adler	3:38
3.	"Corona and Lime"	A. Smith; C. Adler	Cisco Adler	3:56
4.	"Buzzin'"	A. Smith; C. Adler	Cisco Adler	3:32
5.	"Don't Be Shy"	A. Smith; C. Adler	Cisco Adler	3:08
6.	"Hollywood"	A. Smith; C. Adler	Cisco Adler	4:17
7.	"Polaroid"	A. Smith; C. Adler	Cisco Adler	4:47
8.	"James Brown Is Dead"	A. Smith; C. Adler	Cisco Adler	3:25
9.	"Lost My Mind"	A. Smith; C. Adler	Cisco Adler	3:22
10.	"Mary Jane"	C. Adler	Cisco Adler	3:48
11.	"Lazy Susan"	A. Smith; C. Adler	Cisco Adler	3:57
12.	"Flashlight" (featuring Dave Navarro)	A. Smith; C. Adler; J. Gritter	Cisco Adler	4:30
13.	"Buzzin'" (DJ Skeet Skeet Remix featuring Wale)	A. Smith; C. Adler	Cisco Adler.DJ Skeet Skeet	3:56
14.	"High Together" (hidden track)	A. Smith; C. Adler	Cisco Adler	3:20

Samples

- "Don't Be Shy" samples "Do Wah Diddy Diddy" written by Jeff Barry and Ellie Greenwich, originally performed by The Exciters
- "Hollywood" samples "Charlie Brown" written by Jerry Leiber and Mike Stoller, originally performed by The Coasters
- "Lost My Mind" contains a line from Boyz-n-the-Hood by Eazy-E.

== Personnel ==
=== Shwayze ===
- Cisco Adler - lead vocals, Guitar
- Aaron Smith - lead vocals
- Trevor McFedries - DJ/Producer

=== Additional musicians ===
- B. Russ - Bass
- Danny Chaimson - Piano
- Dave Navarro - Electric guitar
- Jeramy Gritter - Acoustic Guitar

== Chart positions ==
Chart (2008)	Peak position
U.S. Billboard 200	10
U.S. Billboard Top R&B/Hip-Hop Albums	5
U.S. Billboard Top Rap Albums	3
U.S. Billboard Top Digital Albums	2
Canadian Albums Chart	92
