= Love Letter (Azu album) =

Studio album by Azu
- Released: 18 January 2012
- Label: Ariola Japan

Azu chronology
AZyoU (2011)	Love Letter (2012)	Best (2012)

Singles from Love Letter
- 1. "トモダチ☆★" Released: 22 June 2011; 2. "Woman" Released: 07 December 2011

Love Letter is the fourth studio album by Azu, released on 18 January 2012. It was released in two versions: a limited CD+DVD edition and a regular CD-only edition. The limited edition comes with a Music Video Best DVD containing music videos of Azu's past hits, such as "Ima Sugu ni...", "You & I" feat. Love Love Love, and "Jikan yo Tomare" feat. Seamo.

The album charted on both the Oricon and Billboard Japan charts, reaching 22 on the Oricon weekly charts (where it charted for five weeks) and 20 on the Billboard Japan Top Album Sales chart. One of the singles on Love Letter, "Woman", reached a peak position of 79 on the Hot 100 chart.

== Catalog number ==
BVCL-302/3 (limited edition)
BVCL-304 (regular edition)

== Track listings ==
CD

1. Stay with Me
2. Ring ~M&M~
3. Woman
4. Ashita no Watashi (明日の私; Tomorrow's Me)
5. Heart Beat
6. I Like U
7. Mr. Right
8. Hands Off!!!
9. Clear Like Crystal
10. Missing You...
11. Saigo no Love Song (最後のLove Song; Last Love Song)
12. Tomodachi☆★ (トモダチ☆★; Friends)
13. Shiawase ni Nareru. (幸せになれる。; Be Happy.)
14. Love Letter ~Kimi ga Iru Kara~ (Love letter ~君がいるから~; Because You Are Here)

DVD

1. Ima Sugu ni... (いますぐに...; Right Now...) (PV)
2. I Will (PV)
3. You & I feat. LOVE LOVE LOVE (PV)
4. For You (PV)
5. Tashika na Koto (たしかなこと; Important Things) (PV)
6. To You... (PV)
7. Broken Heart (PV)
8. Tomodachi☆★ (トモダチ☆★; Friend☆★) (PV)
9. Woman (PV)
10. Jikan yo Tomare feat. SEAMO (時間よ止まれ; Stop Time) (PV)
11. AZU TV

== Charts ==
Chart	Peak position
Oricon Daily Chart	14
Oricon Weekly Chart	22

Total reported sales: 8,137
