= Katie Fforde =

British writer

Catherine Rose Gordon-Cumming Fforde
- Born: Catherine Rose Gordon-Cumming; September 27, 1952 (age 74); Wimbledon, London, England
- Occupation: Novelist
- Spouse: Desmond Fforde (m. 1972)
- Children: 3
- Relatives: Sir William Gordon-Cumming (grandfather)
- Writing career
- Pen name: Katie Fforde
- Genre: Romance
- Website: katiefforde.com

Katie Fforde, née Catherine Rose Gordon-Cumming (born 27 September 1952), is a British romance novelist. Published since 1995, her novels are set in modern-day England.

She is founder of the Katie Fforde Bursary for writers who have yet to secure a publishing contract. She was for many years a committee member of the Romantic Novelists' Association and was elected its twenty-fifth chairman (2009–2011) and later its fourth president. In June 2010 she was announced as a patron of the UK's first National Short Story Week. In 2016, she launched the Stroud Contemporary Fiction Writing Competition, now the Laurie Lee Prize for Writing, as part of the first Stroud Book Festival.

== Biography ==
Catherine Rose Gordon-Cumming was born on 27 September 1952 in Wimbledon, London, the daughter of Shirley Barbara Laub and Michael Willoughby Gordon-Cumming. Her grandfather was Sir William Gordon-Cumming.

Many of Fforde's own experiences end up in her books. Her novel Going Dutch was a Sunday Times top ten bestseller in June 2007. Fforde takes the research for her books seriously, employing a 'method acting'-style approach to the different professions and backgrounds featured in her novels, using experiences such as being a porter in an auction house, making pottery, refurbishing furniture, examining the processes behind a dating website, and going on a Ray Mears survival course.

== Bibliography ==
=== Novels ===
- Living Dangerously (1995)
- The Rose Revived (1995)
- Wild Designs (1996)
- Stately Pursuits (1997)
- Life Skills (1999)
- Thyme Out (2000) aka Second Thyme Around
- Artistic Licence (2001)
- Highland Fling (2002)
- Paradise Fields (2003)
- Restoring Grace (2004)
- Flora's Lot (2005) a.k.a. Bidding for Love
- Practically Perfect (2006)
- Going Dutch (2007)
- Wedding Season (2008)
- Love Letters (2009)
- A Perfect Proposal (2010)
- Summer of Love (2011)
- The Undercover Cook (2012)
- Recipe for Love (2012)
- Best of Romance (2012)
- Staying Away at Christmas (2012)
- A French Affair (2013)
- The Perfect Match (2014)
- A Vintage Wedding (2015)
- Christmas like in a Picture Book (2016)
- A Summer at Sea (2016)
- Candlelight at Christmas (2016)
- Winter Collection (2016)
- Meeting for Christmas (2016)
- Christmas in the Distance (2016)
- Christmas by the Fire (2016)
- A Secret Garden (2017)
- A Summer by the Sea: can you be a girlfriend on vacation? (2017)
- A Country Escape (2018)
- A Summer by the Sea (2018)
- A Garden full of Flowers (2018)
- A Rose Petal Summer (2019)
- The Cottage (2019)
- Country House with Views / A Love in the Highlands (2019)
- Christmas Magic in the Cabin (2019)
- A Springtime Affair (2020)
- A Wedding in the Country (2021)
- A Wedding in Provence (2022)
- One Enchanted Evening (2023)
- Island in the Sun (2024)
- From London with Love (2025)

=== Anthologies edited ===
- Loves Me, Loves Me Not (2009)
- A Christmas Feast and Other Stories (2014)
- The Christmas Stocking and Other Stories (2017)

=== Forewords ===
- "Wannabe a Writer?" (Accent Press 2007, Jane Wenham-Jones)

== Filmography ==
Many of Fforde's novels have been adapted into a series of German TV films. Unlike the novels which are set in England, the TV films are shot in the Northeastern United States.

- Katie Fforde: Die Treue-Testerin - Spezialauftrag Liebe (2008)
- Katie Fforde: Eine Liebe in den Highlands (2010, based on Highland Fling)
- Katie Fforde: Holiday spirit(2010, based on Restoring Grace)
- Katie Fforde: Glücksboten (2010, based on Thyme Out)
- Katie Fforde: Harriets Traum (2011, based on The Rose Revived)
- Katie Fforde: Zum Teufel mit David (2011, based on Living Dangerously)
- Katie Fforde: Diagnosis Love (2012)
- Katie Fforde: Lighthouse with a Wiev (2012)
- Katie Fforde: Jump into Happiness (2012)
- Katie Fforde: Part of You (2012)
- Katie Fforde: Summer of Truth (2012)
- Katie Fforde: An Expensive Fling (2013, based on Flora's Lot)
- Katie Fforde: By Your Side (2014)
- Katie Fforde: The See in You (2014)
- Katie Fforde: Like Fire and Ice (2014)
- Katie Fforde: Geschenkte Jahre (2014, based on Paradise Fields)
- Katie Fforde: Love in New York (2014)
- Katie Fforde: Martha Dances (2014)
- Katie Fforde: Forget Me Not (2015)
- Katie Fforde: Back to the Sea (2015)
- Katie Fforde: The Child I Long For (2015)
- Katie Fforde: A Christmas Miracle in New York (2015)
- Katie Fforde: Why Did I Say Yes? (2016)
- Katie Fforde: Die Frau an seiner Seite (2016)
- Katie Fforde: The Silence of Men (2016)
- Katie Fforde: Summer of Witches (2016)
- Katie Fforde: You and Me (2016)
- Katie Fforde: My son and his fathers (2016)
- Katie Fforde: Dancing on Broadway (2016)
- Katie Fforde: Bella's Luck (2016)
- Katie Fforde: Matter of the Heart (2017)
- Katie Fforde: My Crazy Family (2017)
- Katie Fforde: Brother's Keeper (2017)
- Katie Fforde: Mom at Home Alone (2018)
- Katie Fforde: Pretty Best Friends (2018)
- Katie Fforde: Family on Probation (2018)
- Katie Fforde: A Friend in Need (2018)
- Katie Fforde: Room with an Ocean View (2018)
- Katie Fforde: Kissed Awake (2019)
- Katie Fforde: The Other Woman's Child (2019)
- Katie Fforde: My husband's daughter (2019)
