= The Hangover (soundtrack) =

2009 soundtrack album to The Hangover

The Hangover (Original Motion Picture Soundtrack)

Soundtrack album by Various artists
- Released: June 9, 2009
- Genres: Pop; punk rock; heavy metal; death metal; alternative rock; indie rock; jazz; electronic dance music
- Length: 38:52
- Label: New Line
- Producer: Todd Phillips

The Hangover (Original Motion Picture Soundtrack) is the soundtrack to the 2009 film The Hangover directed by Todd Phillips, released by New Line Records on June 9, 2009. The soundtrack features 12 songs consisting of music by Kanye West, Danzig, The Donnas, Usher, Phil Collins, The Belle Stars, T.I., Wolfmother and The Dan Band, while the film itself consisted of over 20 songs. It features music from multiple genres, including pop, rock, heavy metal and death metal music owing to Phillips' roots in the rock, punk and subcultural genres.

== Background ==
"It's about using music that you like, but more importantly it's about setting a tone for the whole movie. What I don't like about what's happening in movies is this kind of indie-rock vibe of these very sentimental indie-rock songs. 'The Hangover' seems to people that know me like I put my iPod on shuffle. It wasn't about showing how cool you are in your taste. Some of it is very obvious and fun."

— Todd Phillips to MTV

The selections of music from the film were mostly due to Phillips' connection with punk rock, heavy metal music and other genres. He pointed Danzig's "Thirteen" that appears earlier in the film, saying "that song in particular, that version is actually a pretty rare version. The movie is about bad decisions and Las Vegas is about luck. And this song is about being unlucky". He initially used the El Vez song "It's Now or Never" in the film's beginning for the title sequence, and after which Danzig's song plays changing the context of the film. A song from The Cramps was also used in the film as Phillips, at the age of 14, had used to watch the band's punk show for the first time, that changed his life and "It informed everything afterwards for me musically".

The sequence where Mike Tyson plays air drums to "In the Air Tonight" by Phil Collins, was not written in the script, but were created on-set as Phillips felt "when I shot the first day with him, I realized he was really playful. I was like, 'We should have him doing something crazy and memorable.' I wanted to think of a song that was probably playing in all of the gyms when he was working out at his peak. Something that was on the radio, something you could see him training to. A song like 'Eye of the Tiger' but four years later [laughs]. It all happened in a day." Phillips also asked Ed Helms to create a piano ballad for the tiger song, despite not being featured in the script as Helms was a piano player and used to play covers of Elton John songs during the schedule breaks, which insisted him to do one for the film. The song was written within twenty minutes.

"In the Air Tonight" was almost did not make the final cut, as Warner Bros. executives felt that it was beyond the music budget and he had to convince them to license the song, which he felt that the song would be similar to what Metallica's "Master of Puppets" for Old School (2003) did, adding "They are moments that define a spirit of a movie. What you remember about a movie is the spirit of the film." The Dan Band's cover of the 50 Cent single "Candy Shop" was featured in the film. "Right Round" by Flo Rida is played over the ending credits. The film uses the Kanye West song "Can't Tell Me Nothing" for which Zach Galifianakis made an alternative music video.

== Track listing ==
| No. | Title | Artists | Length |
|---|---|---|---|
| 1. | "It's Now or Never" | El Vez | 5:17 |
| 2. | "Thirteen" | Danzig | 4:15 |
| 3. | "Take It Off" | The Donnas | 2:58 |
| 4. | "Fever" | The Cramps | 4:16 |
| 5. | "Wedding Bells" | Gene Vincent and His Blue Caps | 2:31 |
| 6. | "In the Air Tonight" | Phil Collins | 5:30 |
| 7. | "Stu's Song" | Ed Helms | 0:56 |
| 8. | "Rhythm and Booze" | Treat Her Right | 2:49 |
| 9. | "Iko Iko" | The Belle Stars | 2:50 |
| 10. | "Three Best Friends" | Zach Galifianakis | 0:29 |
| 11. | "Ride the Sky II" | Revolution Mother | 2:03 |
| 12. | "Candy Shop" | Dan Finnerty and The Dan Band | 2:58 |
| Total length: | | | 38:52 |

== Additional music ==
The songs that featured in the film and are not in the soundtrack, includes:

- "Who Let the Dogs Out?" – Baha Men
- "Right Round" – Flo Rida ft. Kesha
- "Can't Tell Me Nothing" – Kanye West
- "Live Your Life" – T.I. featuring Rihanna
- "What Do You Say?" – Mickey Avalon and Lil Jon
- "Yeah!" – Usher featuring Ludacris and Lil Jon
- "Joker & the Thief" – Wolfmother

== Chart performance ==
=== Weekly charts ===
| Chart (2009) | Peak position |
|---|---|
| US Billboard 200 | 137 |
| US Soundtrack Albums (Billboard) | 6 |

=== Year-end charts ===
| Chart (2010) | Position |
|---|---|
| US Soundtrack Albums (Billboard) | 24 |

== Original score ==
The film's incidental music is scored by Christophe Beck, who previously collaborated with Phillips on School for Scoundrels (2006). While showcasing the darker side of Las Vegas in contrast to the colorful landscape and environment, Beck wanted the music to travel the same. Hence, he created a small ensemble score, with rhythm section, drums and bass guitars. About the scoring, he said "On purpose, we tried to keep not necessarily wrong notes in. Normally when I record a guitar I try not to get too much finger noise, because it sometimes takes away from the purity of the notes. In this particular case, the more we got the better. I wanted to capture the feeling of a drunk teenager plugging in an electric guitar and not playing very well."

=== The Hangover (Original Music Plus Dialogue Clips) ===
The Hangover (Original Music Plus Dialogue Clips)

Film score by Christophe Beck
- Released: July 7, 2009
- Recorded: 2009
- Genre: Film score
- Length: 20:53
- Label: New Line
- Producer: Christophe Beck

Christophe Beck chronology
| The Pink Panther 2 (2009) | The Hangover (2009) | I Love You, Beth Cooper (2009) |

The Hangover (Original Music Plus Dialogue Clips) is the score album that featured Beck's score with dialogues from the film. It was released on July 7, 2009.

| No. | Title | Artist(s) | Length |
|---|---|---|---|
| 1. | "Theme from the Hangover" | Bradley Cooper and Sasha Barrese | 1:37 |
| 2. | "Meet Mr. Chow" | Zach Galifianakis and Justin Bartha | 1:37 |
| 3. | "Tracking It" | | 1:14 |
| 4. | "Joyride" | Jeffrey Tambor, Justin Bartha, Rachael Harris and Ed Helms | 2:32 |
| 5. | "Sin City" | Zach Galifianakis | 2:09 |
| 6. | "In the Face" | Ed Helms, Bradley Cooper, Rob Riggle and Zach Galifianakis | 1:33 |
| 7. | "Eighty Grand" | | 1:33 |
| 8. | "Stupid Tiger" | Bradley Cooper, Ed Helms and Zach Galifianakis | 1:40 |
| 9. | "Donations" | | 2:50 |
| 10. | "Lucky Charm" | Bradley Cooper and Ken Jeong | 2:03 |
| 11. | "Rooftop Rescue" | | 2:05 |
| Total length: | | | 20:53 |

=== The Hangover (Original Score) ===
The Hangover (Original Score)

Film score by Christophe Beck
- Released: May 21, 2013
- Recorded: 2009
- Genre: Film score
- Length: 9:11
- Label: Varèse Sarabande
- Producer: Christophe Beck

A separate album entirely containing Beck's score was released by Varèse Sarabande along with the music from the second and third instalments on May 21, 2013. The first five tracks denote the score for The Hangover.

| No. | Title | Length |
|---|---|---|
| 1. | "Theme – The Hangover" | 1:37 |
| 2. | "Sin City" | 2:04 |
| 3. | "Stupid Tiger" | 1:54 |
| 4. | "Stu and Jade" | 2:05 |
| 5. | "Rooftop Rescue" | 1:31 |
| Total length: | | 9:11 |
