= Love Letters (novel) =

2009 novel by Katie Fforde

Love letters
- Author: Katie Fforde
- Language: English
- Genre: Young adult novel
- Published: 4 March 2009 Arrow
- Publication place: United Kingdom
- Media type: Print (hardback & paperback)
- Pages: 416 pp
- ISBN: 0099525046

Love Letters is a young adult novel written by author Katie Fforde and published by Arrow in 2009.

== Plot summary ==
Laura Horsley is a 26-year-old young woman who works in a bookshop which is about to close. At an author event that she organizes, Eleanora, a literary agent, is impressed with Laura's work and offers her a job to help her niece organize a literary festival. Laura is keen on the idea, but feels that she is not the right person for the job.

Her friends convince her to attend at least the first meeting, where Laura is given an interesting and almost impossible task - she has to convince her favorite writer, the Irish Dermot Flynn, who hasn't written anything in years, to attend the literary festival. This is a challenge, because Dermot lives as a recluse and it is almost impossible to get in touch with him. The pressure is on, and Laura does not have much time, so she flies to Ireland with her new musician friend, Monica.

They first meet Dermot at a literary evening in a pub. Laura finds him attractive but temperamental. She starts falling in love with her favorite writer. They spend more time together, and Dermot agrees to go to England for the festival. He even agrees to run a course at the University of Bath, and asks Laura to help him selecting the ten best writings.

After the end of the course, Dermot goes back to Ireland, and Laura faces her feeling towards him. She spends the next few weeks organizing the festival, but, due to a misunderstanding, Dermot refuses to go, so Laura flies again to Ireland. She finds out that Dermot does not go to pubs anymore and lives as a recluse again. She goes to his house and saves the situation. Dermot attends the festival and it turns out well. He manages to overcome writer's block and has a great success. Laura and Dermot spend some time away from each other again, but soon Dermot visits Laura at her parents’ house to tell how much he loves her.

== Characters ==
Laura Horsley: a shy 26-year-old young woman who loves books and she is in love with her favorite writer, Dermot Flynn.

Dermot Flynn: a famous good-looking Irish writer, a difficult person who suffers from writer's block. He is in love with Laura.

Eleanora Huckleby: Dermot's headstrong and free-spoken agent.

Grant: Laura's friend and colleague at the bookshop.

Henry Barnsley: Laura's friend and boss, the owner of the bookshop.

Monica Playfair: Laura's musician friend.

Seamus: Monica's musician boyfriend.

Fenella Gainsborough: Eleanora's niece, the organizer of the festival.

Rupert Gainsborough: Fenella's husband.

Marion: the owner of a house in Ireland where Laura and Monica stay.

Sarah Stradford: one of the organizers of the festival.

== Reception ==
Kirkus Reviews gave the book a mixed review, stating "despite occasional flashes of wit, a standard romance tale with a predictable outcome." Publishers Weekly similarly described it as a " cute but meandering story", concluding that it is "comfortable if predictable".
