= Cisco Adler =

American musician (born 1978)

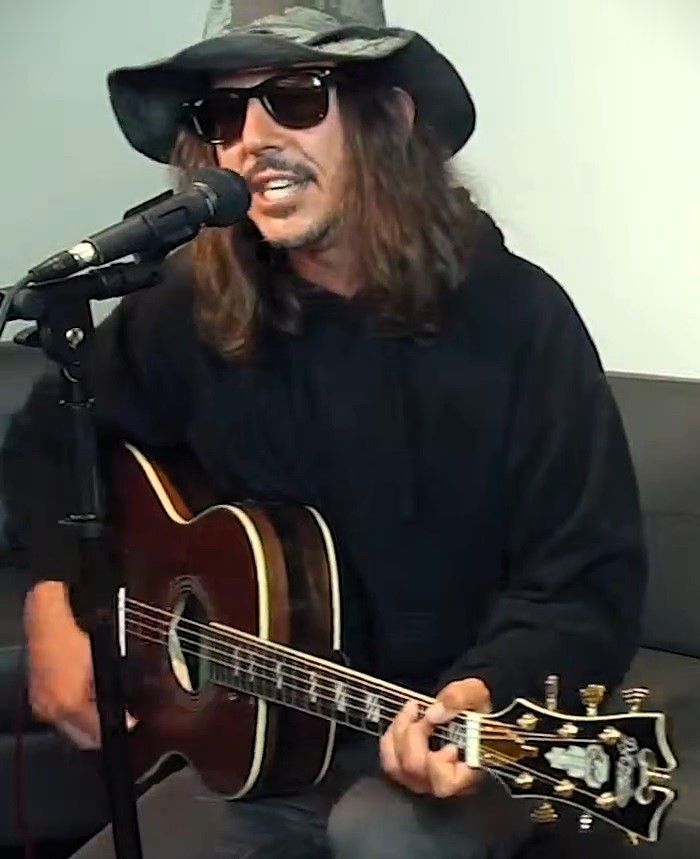
- Adler performing in 2019

Background information
- Born: Cisco Sam Adler; September 6, 1978 (age 47); Los Angeles, California, U.S.
- Genres: Funk rock; alternative hip hop; reggae rock
- Occupations: Musician; songwriter; producer
- Instruments: Vocals; guitar
- Years active: 2000–present
- Labels: Atlantic (2002–2004); Contango (2005–2007); Suretone; Geffen (2007–present); Bananabeat (2010–present)
- Website: Adler's Official MySpace

Cisco Sam Adler (born September 6, 1978) is an American musician, songwriter and record producer.

== Personal life ==
Adler is married to fashion model Barbara Stoyanoff; they have one child. He is the son of record and film producer Lou Adler.

== Career ==
Adler has collaborated extensively with hip-hop artist Shwayze. Their first single "Buzzin'" reached number 46 on the Billboard Hot 100, and the follow-up "Corona and Lime" peaked at number 23. They starred in the MTV reality series Buzzin', have appeared on MTV Cribs, and toured with Warped Tour 2008. They worked with DJ Skeet Skeet on a Nike-sponsored workout program entitled Beach Blast by Shwayze.

Other artists with whom Adler has worked include Mod Sun, Tayyib Ali, Mike Posner, Cody Simpson, and The Internet, Wiz Khalifa, Blackbear, Yung Pinch, Gashi, YG, Pouya, and more.

Solo projects include the mixtapes Pop Shit and Super California Lipstick Sexy Magic Dope Shit.

Adler produced the soundtrack for the 2016 musical comedy television film The Rocky Horror Picture Show: Let's Do the Time Warp Again. He produced and appeared in the film Sweetie Pie.

== Legal issues ==
Adler was arrested in 2008 for assaulting an employee of the Fargo, North Dakota club where he and Shwayze were performing but was released shortly after being taken into custody.

== Discography ==
=== Albums with Whitestarr ===
- Luv Machine (2006)
- Fillith Tillith (2007)

=== Albums with Shwayze ===
Year	Information	Chart positions				Certifications
Year	Information	U.S.	U.S. R&B	U.S. Rap	CAN	Certifications
2008	Shwayze: First studio album; Released: August 19, 2008	10	5	3	92	Sales:
2009	Let It Beat: Second studio album; Released: November 3, 2009	55	—	3	—	Sales:
2011	Island in the Sun: Third studio album; Released: September 13, 2011	—	—	—	—	Sales:

=== Solo albums ===
- Aloha (2012)
- Coastin' (2014)

=== Singles ===
Year	Title	Chart Positions				Album
Year	Title	U.S. 100	Hot Digital	U.S. Pop	Top 40 Mainstream	Album
2008	"Buzzin'"	46	18	47	35	Shwayze
2008	"Corona and Lime"	23	6	32	—	Shwayze
2009	"Get U Home"	—	—	—	—	Let It Beat

=== EPs ===
- Alice in La La Land (2009)
- The W's (2011)
- Aloha (2012)
- One Way (2013)
- Mahalo (2013)
- Don't Kill My Buzz... (2017)

=== Mixtapes ===
- Rich Girls (2008)
- Super California Lipstick Sexy Magic Dope Shit (2010)

Music videos

Year	Title	Director(s)
2006	"Sunshine Girl"	
2007	"Dirty Words"	Bart Hendrikx
2008	"Hollywood"	Shaw
2008	"Buzzin'"	Robert Hales; Alison Foster
2008	"Corona and Lime"	Shane Drake; Brandon Bonfiglio
2009	"Rock n' Roll"	Nicholaus Goossen
2009	"Get U Home"	Stewart Hendler

=== Guest appearances ===
- Andre Legacy – "Bender" (featuring Cisco Adler)
- Andre Legacy – "DJ Dying" (featuring Cisco Adler)
- Beardo – "Back to the Valley" (featuring Cisco Adler)
- Mr. Lil' One/Lil' Uno – "Love Like Magic" (featuring Cisco Adler)
- Mickey Avalon – "What Do You Say" (featuring Cisco Adler, Dirt Nasty and Andre Legacy)
- The Pricks – "Brown Eyes" (featuring Cisco Adler)
- Stallionaires – "Summer Love Child" (featuring Cisco Adler)
- Wiz Khalifa – "Hey Girl" (featuring Cisco Adler)
- Jesse Scott – "Hands Up" (featuring Cisco Adler)
- Big B – "My Baby Says" (featuring Cisco Adler)
- Mod Sun – "Jam On!" (featuring Cisco Adler)
- Kidd Russell – "Are We Having Fun Yet" (featuring Cisco Adler)
- Kidd Russell – "Wake Up" (featuring Cisco Adler)

== Production discography ==
Studio albums

- Shwayze – Shwayze
- Shwayze – Let It Beat
- Cody Simpson – Free

Selected songs

- Chris Young the Rapper – 619
  - Get Romantic
  - Stadium Rap
- Chris Young the Rapper – The Value Pack
  - Get It RIght
- Mickey Avalon – Mickey Avalon
  - Jane Fonda
  - Mr. Right
- Mickey Avalon – Electric Gigoló
  - What Do You Say
  - Stroke Me
- Mike Posner – 31 Minutes to Takeoff
  - Do U Wanna?
  - Gone in September
- Wiz Khalifa
  - Hey Girl
- Dirt Nasty – Nasty as I Wanna Be
  - Big in Japan
  - So L.A.
  - Lookin' for a Nasty Girl
- Big B – Good Times & Bad Advice
  - My Baby Says

== Filmography ==
- MTV Video Music Awards 2008
- Tropic Thunder (2008, soundtrack)
- Buzzin (2008, TV)
- The Rock Life (2007)
- 27 Miles (2005)
- Grind (2003, soundtrack)
- A Token for Your Thoughts (2003, soundtrack)
- Sweetie Pie (2000)
