= Buzzin' (Shwayze song) =

Single by Shwayze

from the album Shwayze
- Released: January 15, 2008
- Studio: Bananabeat Studios (Malibu, CA)
- Genre: Alternative hip hop; rock
- Length: 3:32
- Label: Suretone; Geffen
- Songwriters: Aaron Smith; Cisco Adler
- Producer: Cisco Adler

Shwayze singles chronology
"Buzzin'" (2008)	"Corona and Lime" (2008)

Cisco Adler singles chronology
"Buzzin'" (2008)	"Corona and Lime" (2008)

"Buzzin'" is a song and the first single by American rapper Shwayze. It was released on January 15, 2008, through Suretone Records and Geffen Records, as the lead single from the artist's debut studio album Shwayze. Recording sessions took place at Bananabeat Studios in Malibu, California. Production was handled by Cisco Adler, who also wrote the song together with Shwayze. Music video for the song was directed by Robert Hales.

In the United States, the song made it number 46 on the Billboard Hot 100, number 18 on the Digital Song Sales, number 35 on the Pop Airplay and number 36 on the Ringtones charts in the United States. It was certified Gold by the Recording Industry Association of America on February 21, 2018 for selling 500,000 album equivalent units.

The song peaked at number 80 on the Canadian Hot 100 and number 67 on the Canadian Digital Song Sales, while in the United Kingdom it did not hit the UK Singles Chart, only managing to reach number 63 on the Physical Singles Chart and number 14 on the Hip Hop and R&B Singles Chart.

It also made it to number 31 in Germany, number 45 in Austria and number 63 in Switzerland, as well as peaking at the 17th spot on the Belgian Bubbling Under Ultratop chart.

There are remixes by DJ Skeet Skeet & Cory Nitta which featured Wale, will.i.am, Villains, AC Slater, The Knocks, The Rondo Brothers, Classixx, and the Hanni Fresh remix which featured J. Rocwell and J. Conway. This song later appeared in an episode of Gossip Girl.

== Track listing ==
No.	Title	Writer(s)	Producer(s)	Length
1.	"Buzzin'"	Aaron Smith; Cisco Adler	Cisco Adler	3:32
Total length:				3:32

== Personnel ==
- Aaron "Shwayze" Smith – lyrics, vocals
- Cisco Adler – lyrics, producer, engineering
- Dave Pensado – mixing
- Ted Jensen – mastering
- Jordan Schur – executive producer

== Charts ==
Chart (2008)	Peak position
Austria (Ö3 Austria Top 40)	45
Canada Hot 100 (Billboard)	80
Germany (GfK)	31
Switzerland (Schweizer Hitparade)	63
UK Hip Hop/R&B (Official Charts)	14
US Billboard Hot 100	46
US Digital Song Sales (Billboard)	18

== Certifications ==
Region	Certification	Certified units/sales
United States (RIAA)	Gold	500,000^{‡}
^{‡} Sales+streaming figures based on certification alone.

== Release history ==
Release dates and formats for "Buzzin'"
Region	Date	Format	Label(s)	Ref.
United States	April 15, 2008	Mainstream airplay	Universal Motown	
