= Let It Beat =

Studio album by Shwayze
- Released: November 3, 2009
- Recorded: 2009; Bannabeat Studios (Malibu, California); Electric Lady Studios (New York, New York); Bu' Haven (Malibu, California)
- Genre: Alternative hip hop
- Length: 58:06
- Label: Suretone
- Producer: Jordan Schur (exec.); Cisco Adler; Ric Ocasek; Kool Kojak; Roy Bittan

Shwayze chronology
| Shwayze (2008) | Let It Beat (2009) | Island in the Sun (2011) |

Singles from Let It Beat
- 1. "Get U Home" Released: June 28, 2009

Professional ratings
Review scores
| Source | Rating |
|---|---|
| Allmusic | 2/5 stars |
| Blast Magazine | 3.5/5 stars |

Let It Beat is the second studio album by American rapper Shwayze. It was first announced by Cisco Adler on February 4, 2009, via his Myspace page. He also confirmed the song "Make A Lil Love" in that blog post. A few days later he posted another blog update, which confirmed the track "Livin' It Up," It also confirmed guest appearances from The Knux, and Tabi Bonney. On May 8, 2009 Cisco announced that the album is entitled Let It Beat, and was currently being mixed and mastered. Although Shwayze's previous debut album only had one guest appearance, this album has guest appearances from The Knux, Tabi Bonney, and Snoop Dogg. Darryl Jenifer of Bad Brains plays bass on a track called "Crazy For You," and Ric Ocasek of The Cars plays guitar on the same track. Roy Bittan the pianist of Bruce Springsteen & The E Street Band plays piano on the track Heart and Soul. The first single, "Get U Home" was released on June 28.

== Track listing ==
| No. | Title | Writer(s) | Producer(s) | Length |
|---|---|---|---|---|
| 1. | "Livin' It Up" (featuring Snoop Dogg) | A. Smith; C. Adler; C. Broadus | Cisco Adler | 3:03 |
| 2. | "Get U Home" | C. Adler; A. Smith | Cisco Adler | 3:14 |
| 3. | "Crazy for You" | A. Smith; C. Adler | Cisco Adler; Ric Ocasek | 4:13 |
| 4. | "Maneatrr" | A. Smith; C. Adler; A. Griggg | Cisco Adler; Kool Kojak | 3:20 |
| 5. | "Sally Is a..." | A. Smith; C. Adler | Cisco Adler | 4:22 |
| 6. | "Dirty Little Girl" (featuring The Knux) | A. Smith; C. Adler; K. Lindsey; A. Lindsey | Cisco Adler | 3:48 |
| 7. | "Down at the Motel" | A. Smith; C. Adler | Cisco Adler | 3:23 |
| 8. | "Daze Like This" | A. Smith; C. Adler | Cisco Adler | 3:44 |
| 9. | "Wait All Night" (featuring Tabi Bonney) | A. Smith; C. Adler | Cisco Adler | 3:19 |
| 10. | "Perfect for Me" | A. Smith; C. Adler | Cisco Adler | 4:37 |
| 11. | "Make a Lil' Love" | A. Smith; C. Adler | Cisco Adler | 3:46 |
| 12. | "Heart and Soul" | A. Smith; C. Adler | Cisco Adler; Roy Bittan | 5:20 |
| 13. | "Digital Girlfriend" (iTunes exclusive) | A. Smith; C. Adler | Cisco Adler | 4:20 |
| 14. | "Rock n Roll" (Amazon mp3 exclusive) | A. Smith; C. Adler | Cisco Adler |

== Personnel ==
=== Shwayze ===
- Cisco Adler - lead vocals, Guitar, piano
- Shwayze - lead vocals

=== Additional musicians ===
- Mark Smidt - Trumpet, Trombone, Baritone Sax, Acoustic Guitar, Organ, Bass guitar, Keyboards, electric guitar, Trumpets Horn Arrangement,
- Ric Ocasek - Guitar, Synthesizer, Backing Vocals
- Darryl Jenifer - Bass guitar
- Kool Kojak - Drum Programming, Synths, Bass guitar, Backing Vocals
- Roy Bittan - Piano
- Snoop Dogg - Vocals
- The Knux - Vocals
- Tabi Bonney - Vocals

== Chart positions ==
| Chart (2009) | Peak position |
|---|---|
| U.S. Billboard 200 | 55 |
| U.S. Billboard Top Digital Albums | 10 |
| U.S. Billboard Top Rap Albums | 22 |
