= Corona and Lime (song) =

Single by Shwayze

from the album Shwayze
- Released: July 23, 2008
- Recorded: 2008
- Genre: Alternative hip hop; rock
- Length: 3:56
- Label: Suretone; Geffen
- Songwriters: A. Smith; C. Adler
- Producer: Cisco Adler

Shwayze singles chronology
"Buzzin'" (2008)	"Corona and Lime" (2008)	"Get U Home" (2009)

Cisco Adler singles chronology
"Buzzin'" (2008)	"Corona and Lime" (2008)	"Get U Home" (2009)

"Corona and Lime" is a song by American rapper Shwayze. It was released in July 2008 as the second single from his debut album, Shwayze.

== Chart performance ==
The single debuted at No. 26 on the Billboard Hot 100 for the chart week of August 2, 2008, making it Shwayze's highest debut on the chart. It peaked at No. 23 the following week. It debuted on the Pop 100 chart at No. 36 the same week, reaching a peak of No. 32 in its second week on the chart. A music video to the song was also released.

=== Charts ===
Chart (2008)	Peak position
U.S. Billboard Hot 100	23
U.S. Billboard Pop 100	32
