= Island in the Sun (album) =

Island In The Sun

Studio album by Shwayze and Cisco
- Released: September 13, 2011
- Recorded: 2010–2011
- Studio: Bananabeat Studios
- Label: Bananabeat Records
- Producers: Cisco Adler; Party Rock; GoonRock

Shwayze chronology
Let It Beat (2009)	Island In The Sun (2011)

Singles from Island In The Sun
- 1. "You Could Be My Girl" Released: July 19, 2011

Island In The Sun is the third studio album by American rapper Shwayze and American musician, songwriter and record producer Cisco Adler. The album was first announced on May 20, 2011, with an initial release date slated for August 16, 2011. The album was later delayed before ultimately being released on September 13, 2011 with 11 tracks.

== Track listing ==
No.	Title	Writer(s)	Producer(s)	Length
1.	"Island in the Sun"	Cisco Adler; Aaron Smith; Mark Curtis Smidt	Cisco Adler	3:38
2.	"Golden Dreams"	Adler; Smith	Cisco Adler	4:48
3.	"You Could Be My Girl"	Adler; Smith	Cisco Adler	2:45
4.	"Do You Feel the Love"	Adler; Smith	Cisco Adler	3:41
5.	"Butterflies"	Adler; Smith	Cisco Adler	3:27
6.	"Drunk Off Your Love" (featuring Sky Blu)	Adler; Smith; Skyler Austen Gordy	Cisco Adler; Party Rock; GoonRock	3:46
7.	"Over and Over" (featuring Kendrick Lamar and Sophie Stern)	Adler; Smith; Kendrick Duckworth; Sophie Mattos Stern	Cisco Adler	5:30
8.	"Summertime Music"	Adler; Smith; Smidt	Cisco Adler	2:20
9.	"Waste the Time Away"	Adler; Smith; Smidt	Cisco Adler	3:55
10.	"When We Get There" (featuring Nikko Gray)	Adler; Smith; Nikko Gray	Cisco Adler	3:26
11.	"Keys to My Heart"	Adler; Smith	Cisco Adler	3:39

== Charts ==
Chart (2011)	Peak position
US Billboard 200	118
US Top Rap Albums (Billboard)	13
US Independent Albums (Billboard)	28
