= Buzzin' (TV series) =

- Starring: Shwayze; Cisco Adler
- Country of origin: United States
- Original language: English
- No. of seasons: 1
- No. of episodes: 8

Production
- Executive producers: Jordan Schur; George Verschoor; David Osper
- Production company: Hoosick Falls Productions

Original release
- Network: MTV
- Release: July 23 – September 19, 2008

Buzzin' was a TV series that focused on musicians Cisco Adler and Shwayze. The show documented Shwayze and Adler's rise to fame and entertaining life in Malibu, California. Their style of music is a collaboration of hip-hop and alternative. The show aired on MTV and premiered on July 23, 2008.

== Episodes ==
No.	Title	Original release date
1	"Super Monday"	July 23, 2008
2	"Das Booted"	July 30, 2008
3	"Losing It in San Diego"	August 6, 2008
4	"Sticker Shock"	August 13, 2008
5	"Working on Wango"	August 20, 2008
6	"Unhappy Birthday"	August 29, 2008
7	"No Hats on the Bed"	September 5, 2008
8	"Where's Warren"	September 19, 2008
