= Mickey Avalon =

American rapper (born 1975)

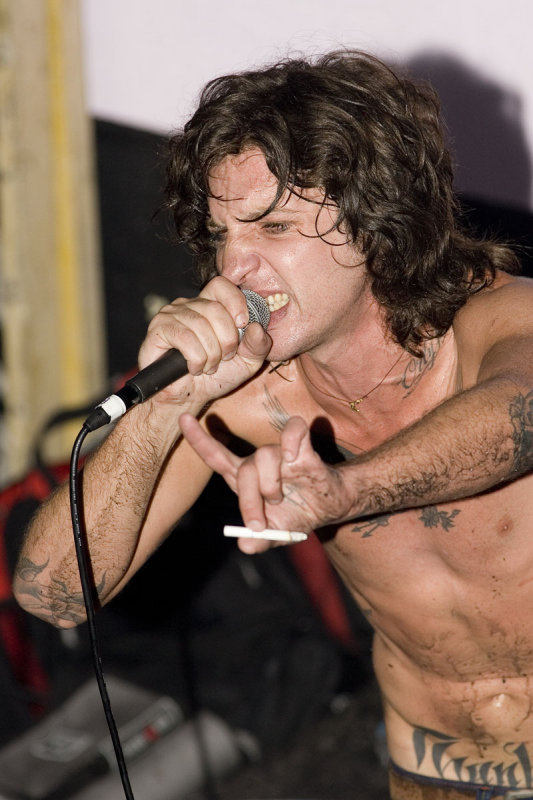
- Avalon performing in 2007

Background information
- Also known as: Mickey Avalon
- Born: Yeshe Perl; December 3, 1975 (age 50)
- Origin: Hollywood, California, U.S.
- Genre: Hip hop
- Occupation: Rapper
- Years active: 1990–present
- Labels: Shoot to Kill; MySpace; Interscope; Suburban Noize
- Formerly of: Dyslexic Speedreaders
- Website: mickeyavalon.com

Mickey Avalon (born Yeshe Perl; December 3, 1975) is an American rapper from California. His debut self-titled solo album was released in 2006 on Interscope/Shoot to Kill Records in association with MySpace Records. Frequent topics of Avalon's songs are his experiences with substance abuse and prostitution.

== Early life ==
Avalon was raised in a Jewish family and had a turbulent childhood. His paternal grandparents were Holocaust survivors who were imprisoned at Auschwitz. His father, who was leaving an Alcoholics Anonymous meeting, was struck and severely injured by a drunk driver. At age 19, Avalon made the decision to take his father off life support, ending his life.

During his late teens, Avalon briefly adhered to Orthodox Judaism in an effort to stay off the streets. Avalon continued as a sex worker and drug dealer until finding success in the music industry. By his early 20s, Avalon married, had a daughter, and moved to Portland, Oregon.

While battling drug addiction, Avalon moved in with his sister, also a drug addict, with the hope that they could aid each other in recovery. During this time, his sister relapsed and died from a heroin overdose. Deciding that he wanted more out of life, Avalon moved back to Los Angeles to make a final attempt to clean up his act. It was shortly after this return to Southern California that Avalon met Simon Rex and began to gain recognition for his music.

== Style ==
The majority of Avalon's work has themes of hard drug use, particularly in reference to his consumption of heroin and crack cocaine, an unusual style in hip hop, where the artist more commonly refers to the sale of such substances. Another popular theme in Avalon's music is his seduction, and sexual encounters with men and women. This is coupled with his overtly sexualized image, often performing with heavy eye makeup and no shirt.

== Career ==
Upon moving to Los Angeles, he was befriended by ex-MTV VJ Simon Rex who encouraged Avalon to rap and collaborated with him. The two began passing out demos to Hollywood clubs and soon developed a following among fans of the Santa Cruz nightclub scene.

Upon entering the hip-hop scene in 2000, Avalon first adopted the stage name the Relevant and made his first appearance on Met Fly (who would later be known as Andre Legacy)'s album titled Wiggin' Out. In 2004, Avalon first collaborated with Existereo of the Shape Shifters's on the song "No Class." He later collaborated with Existereo again on "Couple o'Shitbags & The Fly's That Go With 'em" (2005), "Wrong Side" (2006), and "I Love Who" (2007).

On October 31, 2006, Mickey Avalon released his self-titled debut solo album. Released on Interscope/Shoot to Kill Records in association with MySpace Records, the album spawned the singles "Jane Fonda" and "Mr. Right". In January 2007, Avalon contributed lyrics and vocals on Unwritten Law's "Shoulda Known Better." That same year, he was featured in a Boost Mobile rap commercial with fellow rappers Jermaine Dupri and Young Jeezy.

In March 2007, Avalon was booed off the stage while opening for the Red Hot Chili Peppers, in Oklahoma City. The next day, Red Hot Chili Peppers lead guitarist John Frusciante wrote a letter to the band's fans in Oklahoma City, accusing them of booing Avalon for personal issues, and having a lack of "regard for humanity."

In 2011, after years of back and forth wrangling with Interscope, Mickey was released from his recording contract. He is currently signed to Suburban Noize Records. In March 2012, he digitally released a 4-track EP entitled On the Ave. His second solo album, Loaded was released in April 2012.

In October 2013, Mickey Avalon released a 5 track EP titled I Get Even Even, and later released a music video for the track "Hollywood" (feat. Paul Oakenfold).

Three years later, in November 2016, he announced that his third album, Teardrops on My Tombstone would be available on Valentine's Day 2017.

Speak of the Devil is the fourth full-length album by Mickey Avalon, released on July 17, 2020. His fifth full length album, Never Satisfied, was released on March 10, 2023.

On February 14, 2025, Mickey Avalon teamed up with Canadian producer Rove to release the collaborative album Postcards From Hell (mixed and mastered by Deeskee at Weightless Audio LA).

=== Dyslexic Speedreaders ===
After Mickey became close friends with Simon Rex, they formed a rap group called the Dyslexic Speedreaders. The group included Mickey Avalon, Simon "Dirt Nasty" Rex, Andre Legacy, and Beardo as the four members. Andre Legacy was Avalon's friend since elementary school and Beardo was Avalon's friend from their work together in the modelling industry. In 2004, the Dyslexic Speedreaders released their first album which was entitled Catching Up To Wilt. In 2007, the Dyslexic Speedreaders collaborated with Luckyiam of the group Living Legends on the song, "Nevermind."

In 2008, the Dyslexic Speedreaders released the Shoot To Kill Mixtape. In 2009, Mickey Avalon released "What Do You Say?" which was also part of the soundtrack to the film The Hangover and featured Dirt Nasty and Andre Legacy. Avalon announced through his Myspace page that this would be the last song that the Dyslexic Speedreaders would release.

After years of friendship and musical collaborations, the group disbanded after Mickey had a dispute with the other members over unpaid loans. On November 7, 2010, Avalon announced on theFIVE10 Radio that he was leaving his label and that his relationship with Dirt Nasty and Andre Legacy had been strained due to money issues. He told JC of theFIVE10 Radio that Dirt Nasty and Andre Legacy never paid him back for all the money he had put into developing them and that was the reason they were not talking. He stated that there was still room for reconciliation by saying, "No one slept with anyone's chick." Dirt Nasty is reported to have responded to Avalon's comment, stating "Well I know that Avalon didn't sleep with ANY chicks, because everyone knows that he prefers dick."

During his July 31, 2011, interview on Stefanie's Rock Show, Avalon stated that he briefly reunited with the Dyslexic Speedreaders for an unplanned one time performance. He attended the Roxy with his daughter while Dirt Nasty and Andre Legacy were scheduled to perform that night. During the course of the show, Avalon accepted an invitation to perform on stage with his former bandmates. He said he is open to the possibility of future reunions. In November 2015, Mickey Avalon and Dirt Nasty officially reconciled by releasing a 5-song collaborative EP entitled "Married to the Game".

== Personal life ==
Avalon has two younger half-brothers, who are identical twins. He has helped them relocate to the Los Angeles area and enter the music industry.

== Tours ==
- "Stroke Me Tour" (2009) (Feat. Beardo & Kesha)
- "Blazed & Confused Tour" (2009)
- "Loaded/Jaegermeister Tour" (2012)
- "Teardrops on my Tombstone” (2015)
- "Married to the Game Tour" (Feat. Dirt Nasty) (2016)
- "Never Satisfied Tour" (2023)

== Discography ==
=== Albums ===
Year	Album	Record label
2006	Mickey Avalon	MySpace Records
2012	Loaded	Suburban Noize Records
2013	I Get Even EP	Ragtop Records
2015	Married to the Game EP	Self-released
2017	Teardrops on My Tombstone	Self-released
2018	Some Kind of Exciting EP	Self-released
2019	Some Kind of Exciting, Side B EP	Self-released
2020	Speak of the Devil	Suburban Noize Records
2023	Never Satisfied	BIG PULL
2025	Postcards From Hell	OTHAR

=== Singles ===
- "Jane Fonda" (2006) - Mickey Avalon (#36 Billboard Modern Rock Tracks chart)
- "Mr. Right" (2007) - Mickey Avalon
- "Fuckin Em All" (2009) - Non-album release
- "What Do You Say?" (2009) - The Hangover soundtrack
- "Stroke Me" (2007) - Non-album release
- "I Wanna" (2010) - Non-album release
- "I Luv LA!" (2010) - Non-album release
- "Tight Blue Jeans" (2011) - Loaded
- "Rock Bottom" (2011) - Loaded
- "I'm Hot" (2012) - Loaded
- "Mr Right" (2013) - Loaded
- "More Junk" (2012) - Loaded
- "Girlfriend" (2012) - Loaded
- "I Like It Raw" (feat. Speedball) (2012)
- "Hollywood" (Feat. Paul Oakenfold) (2013)
- "Butt F**k Your Face" (2016) - Non-album release
- "Red Light District" (2018) - Non-album release
- "End of My Line" (2018) - Some Kind Of Exciting
- "Dolly Parton" (2018) - Some Kind Of Exciting
- "Freeway" (2018) - Some Kind Of Exciting
- "Jacques Cousteau" (2018) - Some Kind Of Exciting
- "Future Atomic" (2018) - Some Kind Of Exciting
- "Two Time Loser" (2018) - Some Kind Of Exciting
- "Another Quarter" (2018) - Some Kind Of Exciting
- "Blue Medusa" (2018) - Some Kind Of Exciting
- "Davy Crockett" (2018) - Some Kind Of Exciting
- "Billy Shakespeare" (2018) - Some Kind Of Exciting
- "Black Trans-Am" (2019) - Some Kind Of Exciting
- "Woke AF" (2020) - Speak Of The Devil
- "Ultra-Violence" (2020) - Speak Of The Devil
