= Seamo =

Japanese hip-hop recording artist (born 1975)

- Also known as: Seamo, Seamonator
- Born: Naoki Takada (高田尚輝); October 31, 1975 (age 51)
- Origin: Ichinomiya, Aichi Prefecture
- Genres: Hip hop, J-pop
- Occupations: Rapper; singer-songwriter
- Years active: 1995–present
- Labels: Sony Music Entertainment Japan (2002–2011; 2019-present) * Sony Records (2002–2004) * BMG Japan (2005–2009) * Ariola Japan (2009–2011; 2019-present); Universal J (2011–2019)
- Website: seamo.jp

Naoki Takada (高田 尚輝, Takada Naoki; born October 31, 1975) is a Japanese hip hop recording artist better known by his stage name Seamo (シーモ, Shīmo). He made his debut in 2002 using the alias Seamonator (シーモネーター, Shīmonētā), but later changed his name to Seamo. He made his solo debut in 2005 with the Japanese record label BMG Japan with the single "Kanpaku" (関白, Advisor). Seamo became famous when he appeared along with the duo Bennie K on the song "A Love Story." In 2006, Seamo had his best-selling single in Japan with "Mata Aimashō" (マタアイマショウ), which despite peaking at number fourteen on the singles chart has spent thirty four weeks on the chart and sold more than 160,000 copies so far. His debut album is Get Back On Stage, released on October 31, 2005. His second album, Live Goes On, made its debut on the Japanese chart at number one. As his favorite artists and influences, Seamo lists Kool Keith, MC Hammer, and Japanese acts Unicorn, Sing Like Talking, and Original Love.

In 2008, he released "Honey Honey" feat. Ayuse Kozue, which was used as the ending theme song of the second season of the anime xxxHolic, xxxHolic: Kei. His song "My Answer" was used as the tenth ending of the popular anime Naruto Shippuden. His song "Umi e Ikou" was featured as the ending theme for the 2010 live-action drama Moyashimon.

== Career before Seamo ==
Before re-debuting as Seamo, Takada performed under the name Seamonator, derived from mixing The Terminator with "vulgar humor" (下ネタ, Shīmoneta). He performed largely as a comedian and performer for the band MAS up until 1999, when he met DJ Taki-Shit in Nagoya's nightclub "Lush The Underground". Together the two formed a duo hip-hop unit, producing music together starting with Sea Attacker 2000 (シーアタッカー2000, Shī Atakkā 2000) in the spring of 2000. In 2001, Takada took on his second alias, Cram School President (塾長, Jyukuchō). He largely uses this alias for larger scale events and collaborations that he organizes, including the compilation albums Nagoya Place (名古屋場所, Nagoya Basho) in 2001 and Legend of the Men's Cram School (男塾伝説, Otoko-jyuku Densetsu) in 2002. Seamonator & DJ Taki-Shit made their major debut in 2002 with the single Romantic Stream (浪漫ストリーム, Roman Sutorīmu). The duo released their final album Shimodasu (シモダス) in 2003, wherein DJ Taki-Shit subsequently moved to Tokyo. Takada performed in various collaborations during this time under the alias of Seamonator, until he eventually abandoned it in favor of Seamo, believing that he had exhausted Seamonator's potential as a persona at that point.

== Discography ==
=== Compilations ===
- Stock Delivery (2008)
- Best Of Seamo (2009)
- Collabo Densetsu (2011)
- Love Song Collection (2014)

=== Albums ===
- Get Back On Stage (2005)
- Live Goes On (2006)
- Round About (2007)
- Stock Delivery (2008)
- Scrap & Build (2008)
- messenger (2011)
- REVOLUTION (2012)
- To The Future (2013)
- Moshi Moseamo? (2018)
- Glory (2019)
- Wave My Flag (2019)

=== Singles ===
- "Kanpaku" (関白, Advisor)
- "Drive"
- "Kanpaku"
- "A Love Story"
- "Mata Aimashou"
- "See You Later" (マタアイマショウ, Mata Aimashō)
- "Lupin the Fire" (ルパン・ザ・ファイヤー, Rupan za Faiyā)
- "Cry Baby"
- "Fly Away"
- "Kiseki"
- "Locus" (軌跡, Kiseki)
- "Mother"
- "Honey Honey (feat. Ayuse Kozue)"
- "Yasashii Kaze"
- "My Answer"
- "Continue"
- "ONE LIFE"
- "Owari to Hajimari\Lost Boy
- "HOLD MY HAND (feat. HOME MADE Kazoku)"
- Yakusoku (Promise)
- "Umi e Ikou"
- "Kimi ni 1-nichi 1-kai "Suki" to Iu"
- "Yogoreta Tsubasa De"

=== EP ===
- 5 Women (2010)
- One Life (2011)

=== Collaborations ===
1. Small World
  - September 19, 2002
  - 1,890 Copies
2. "I've Been Looking For You ~Seamonator & DJ Taki-Shit Remix feat. Crystal Boy" (君をさがしてた ～シーモネーター＆DJ Taki-Shit Remix feat. Crystal Boy」, Kimi o Sagashiteta ~shīmonētā & DJ Taki-Shit Remix feat. Crystal Boy)
  - May 9, 2002
3. "Koino abc Iede"
  - September 10, 2003
  - Onani-Machine＆Seamonator
4. "The Club"
  - March 8, 2006
  - Tenjou Chiki feat. Seamo
5. Win and Shine
  - May 24, 2006
  - From the collaborations of the Ukatrats FC, produced by m-flo's Taku Takahashi
  - 5,692 Copies
6. swing presents...Peace from Central Japan
  - June 28, 2006
7. "Hey Boy! Hey Girl!"
  - Seamo feat. BoA
8. "Rock This Way"
  - October 17, 2012
  - Seamo feat. SPYAIR
