= JCW Volume 3 =

2003 Juggalo Championshxt Wrestling event

- Promotion: Juggalo Championshxt Wrestling
- Date: March 16, 2003
- City: Columbus, Ohio
- Venue: Newport Music Hall

Juggalo Championshxt Wrestling event chronology
← Previous; Gathering of the Juggalos 2002	Next → Gathering of the Juggalos 2003

JCW Volume 3 was a professional wrestling event produced by Juggalo Championshxt Wrestling (JCW). The show took place on March 16, 2003 at the Newport Music Hall in Columbus, Ohio. The event was released on home video formats on November 11, 2003.

== Production ==
=== Background ===
On March 12, 1996, the Insane Clown Posse released a VHS tape titled ICP's Strangle-Mania, a compilation tape which featured matches from the Outrageously Violent Wrestling From Japan video collection overdubbed with commentary from the ICP themselves with Violent J (Joe Bruce) being called Diamond Donovan "3D" Douglas and Shaggy 2 Dope (Joe Utsler) being called Handsome Harley "Gweedo" Guestella. The video also featured various matches from various IWA Japan shows including Cactus Jack vs. Shoji Nakamaki, Shoji Nakamaki vs. Hiroshi Ono, and Terry Funk vs. Cactus Jack at Kawasaki Dream, Headhunter A vs. Headhunter B at All I Need ~A Chance For Me~, and Leatherface and Cactus Jack vs. Hiroshi Ono and Shoji Nakamaki at A Spring Breeze ~Condition Of Victory~, The success of the video would lead Bruce and Utsler to co-produce their own wrestling show with the Northern States Wrestling Alliance (NSWA) and booker Dan Curtis titled Strangle-Mania Live which was held at St. Andrews Hall in Detroit, Michigan. The show featured the Insane Clown Posse themselves main eventing the show against the Chickenboys in a steel cage match. On December 27, 1998, Insane Clown Posse would team up with Dan Curtis again to produce a show titled Hellfire Wrestling at the Majestic Theatre in Detroit which featured a 20 man battle royal for the Hellfire Championship as the main event. This was initially going to lead to an eighty-city Hellfire Wrestling tour, but two days after the show, Curtis had passed away in his apartment after a sudden diabetic problem. The Hellfire Wrestling tour would be cancelled. A second VHS video tape titled ICP's Strangle-Mania Volume 2 would be released on August 4, 1999 which featured several bonus matches and would also feature Twiztid's Jamie Madrox as "Lucious" Johnny Stark on commentary.

On December 19, 1999 the Insane Clown Posse partnered with bookers Brian Gorie and Dave Prazak to hold the first "Juggalo Championshxt Wrestling" show which was taped and released as JCW Volume 1 on May 9, 2000 with commentary provided by the Insane Clown Posse as 3D and Gweedo and Madrox as Johnny Stark. The show was main evented by the Insane Clown Posse fighting team of two Doink the Clowns (played by Tarek The Great and Truth Martini) to become the inaugural JCW Tag Team Champions. When the video was released, it lasted 38 weeks on the Billboard Sports and Recreation Top Sellers list with it charting as high as number 2 at one time. However, Prazak left the promotion due to financial issues, leaving Gordie to book a 15-day Strangle-Mania Live tour from April to May 2000 with dates spanning from Detroit, Michigan to Denver, Colorado. JCW Volume 2 was taped in Milwaukee, Wisconsin on April 19, 2000 and was released on July 23, 2001, charting as high as number 8 on the Billboard Sports and Recreation Top Sellers list. and in Cleveland, Ohio on May 4, 2000.

In 2002, the Insane Clown Posse planned to record matches from the Gathering of the Juggalos which would have been featured in JCW Volume 3. However, due to the amount of injuries sustained by the wrestlers and the rowdiness of the fans, the footage was scrapped in favor of a stand-alone event which took place on March 16, 2003.

=== Storylines ===
JCW Volume 3 featured professional wrestling matches that involves different wrestlers from pre-existing scripted feuds and storylines. Wrestlers portrayed villains, heroes, or less distinguishable characters in scripted events that built tension and culminated in a wrestling match or series of matches. Storylines were produced on Juggalo Championshxt Wrestling's various events.

== Results ==
Other on-screen personnel
Role:	Name:
Commentators	Violent J (as Diamond Donovan Douglas)
Commentators	Shaggy 2 Dope (as Harvey "Gweedo" Guestella)

No.	Matches*	Stipulations	Times
1	Psycho Patrick defeated Lenny Lane by pinfall	Singles match	—
2	Josh Prohibition vs. M-Dogg 20 ended in a no contest	Singles match	3:40
3	Kamala defeated Tom Dub by pinfall	Singles match	3:48
4	Nosawa defeated Breyer Wellington (with Natasha) (c) by pinfall	Singles match for the JCW Heavyweight Championship	7:58
5	Corporal Robinson defeated 2 Tuff Tony by pinfall	Singles match	—
6	Mad Man Pondo defeated Necro Butcher by pinfall	200 light tubes death match	13:36
7	Abdullah The Butcher vs. The Rude Boy ended in a double disqualification	Singles match	11:00
8	Insane Clown Posse (Shaggy 2 Dope and Violent J) (c) Feminem (Adam Gooch) and Kid Cock by pinfall	Tag team match for the JCW Tag Team Championship	11:13
(c) / – the champion(s) heading into the match; *Card subject to change
