= Strangle-Mania Live Tour =

2000 Juggalo Championshxt Wrestling multi-day tour

- Promotion: Juggalo Championshxt Wrestling
- Date: April 14-May 5, 2000
- City: Night 1: Denver, Colorado; Night 2: Milwaukee, Wisconsin; Night 3: Philadelphia, Pennsylvania; Night 4: Cleveland, Ohio
- Venue: Night 1: Fillmore Auditorium; Night 2: The Rave/Eagles Club; Night 3: Electric Factory; Night 4: Agora Theatre

Juggalo Championship Wrestling event chronology
← Previous; JCW Volume 1	Next → Gathering of the Juggalos 2000

Strangle-Mania chronology
← Previous; Strangle-Mania Live	Next → Strangle-Mania Live: Deathmatch Madness

The Strangle-Mania Live tour was a multi-day professional wrestling tour produced by Juggalo Championshxt Wrestling (JCW). The tour took place on April 14, 2000 at the Fillmore Auditorium in Denver, Colorado, April 19, 2000 at the The Rave/Eagles Club in Milwaukee, Wisconsin, April 26, 2000 at the Electric Factory in Philadelphia, Pennsylvania, and May 5, 2000 at the Agora Theatre in Cleveland, Ohio. The shows in Cleveland and Milwaukee were both taped and were featured as part of JCW Volume 2 which was released on July 23, 2001 with the video charting as high as number 8 on the Billboard Sports and Recreation Top Sellers list. This was also the second show to use the Strangle-Mania name.

== Production ==
=== Background ===
On March 12, 1996, the Insane Clown Posse released a VHS tape titled ICP's Strangle-Mania, a compilation tape which featured matches from the Outrageously Violent Wrestling From Japan video collection overdubbed with commentary from the ICP themselves with Violent J (Joe Bruce) being called Diamond Donovan "3D" Douglas and Shaggy 2 Dope (Joe Utsler) being called Handsome Harley "Gweedo" Guestella. The video also featured various matches from various IWA Japan shows including Cactus Jack vs. Shoji Nakamaki, Shoji Nakamaki vs. Hiroshi Ono, and Terry Funk vs. Cactus Jack at Kawasaki Dream, Kawasaki Dream, and Headhunter A vs. Headhunter B at All I Need ~A Chance For Me~, and Leatherface and Cactus Jack vs. Hiroshi Ono and Shoji Nakamaki at A Spring Breeze ~Condition Of Victory~, The success of the video would lead Bruce and Utsler to co-produce their own wrestling show with the Northern States Wrestling Alliance (NSWA) and booker Dan Curtis titled Strangle-Mania Live which was held at St. Andrews Hall in Detroit, Michigan. The show featured the Insane Clown Posse themselves main eventing the show against the Chickenboys in a steel cage match. On December 27, 1998, Insane Clown Posse would team up with Dan Curtis again to produce a show titled Hellfire Wrestling at the Majestic Theatre in Detroit which featured a 20 man battle royal for the Hellfire Championship as the main event. This was initially going to lead to an eighty-city Hellfire Wrestling tour, but two days after the show, Curtis had passed away in his apartment after a sudden diabetic problem. The Hellfire Wrestling tour would be cancelled. A second VHS video tape titled ICP's Strangle-Mania Volume 2 would be released on August 4, 1999 which featured several bonus matches and would also feature Twiztid's Jamie Madrox as "Lucious" Johnny Stark on commentary.

On December 19, 1999 the Insane Clown Posse teamed up with bookers Brian Gorie and Dave Prazak to hold the first "Juggalo Championshxt Wrestling" show which would be taped and be released as JCW Volume 1 on May 9, 2000 with commentary provided by the Insane Clown Posse as 3D and Gweedo and Madrox as Johnny Stark. The show would be main evented by the Insane Clown Posse fighting team of two Doink the Clowns (played by Tarek The Great and Truth Martini) to become the inaugural JCW Tag Team Champions. When the video was released, it lasted 38 weeks on the Billboard Sports and Recreation Top Sellers list with it charting as high as number 2 at one time. However, Prazak would leave the promotion due to financial issues, leaving Gordie to book a 15-day Strangle-Mania Live tour from April to May 2000 with dates spanning from Detroit, Michigan to Denver, Colorado. JCW Volume 2 would be taped in Milwaukee, Wisconsin on April 19, 2000 and in Cleveland, Ohio on May 4, 2000.

=== Storylines ===
The Strangle-Mania Live Tour featured professional wrestling matches that involves different wrestlers from pre-existing scripted feuds and storylines. Wrestlers portrayed villains, heroes, or less distinguishable characters in scripted events that built tension and culminated in a wrestling match or series of matches. Storylines were produced on Juggalo Championshxt Wrestling's various events.

== Results ==
Night 1 - April 14, 2000
No.	Results	Stipulations
1	Tarek The Doink defeated Izzy High	Singles match
2	Billy Bill defeated Dick Nipple	Double tables match
3	Leatherface defeated Pat Tanaka	Singles match
4	Uganda defeated Tom Dub	Singles match
5	Kenji defeated Breyer Wellington	Singles match
6	2 Tuff Tony defeated Chuck Hogan	Barbed wire ladder match
7	Mad Man Pondo defeated Fat Fuck Barrel Boy	Stop sign, staple gun, barbed wire, bat, thumbtack match
8	Insane Clown Posse (Violent J and Shaggy 2 Dope) and DJ Willie B defeated The Rainbow Coalition (Big Flame, Bob, and Neil)	Six man tag team match

Night 2 - April 19, 2000
No.	Results	Stipulations
1	Evil Dead and Insane Clown Posse (Shaggy 2 Dope and Violent J) defeated Big Flame, Bob, and Neil	Six man tag team match

Night 3 - April 26, 2000
No.	Results	Stipulations
1	Tom Dub defeated Fat Hillbilly	Singles match
2	Pat Tanaka defeated N/A & N/A	Two on one handicap match
3	Chuck Hogan defeated Cash Flo	Barbed wire ladder match
4	Billy Bill defeated Dick Nipple	Singles match
5	Mad Man Pondo defeated Fat Fuck Barrel Boy	AIDS-infested thumbtack broken blass death match
6	Insane Clown Posse (Shaggy 2 Dope and Violent J) and Vampiro defeated The Rainbow Coalition (Big Flame, Bob, and Neil)	Six man tag team match

Night 4 - May 5, 2000
No.	Results	Stipulations
1	Hornswagglin' Hillbilly defeated Tom Dub	Singles match
2	Hy-Zaya defeated Chris Hero	Singles match
3	Billy Bill defeated Dick Nipple	Double table match
4	Mad Man Pondo defeated Fat Fuck Barrel Boy	Death match
5	Abdullah The Butcher defeated The Rude Boy	Steel cage match
