= Strangle-Mania Live =

1997 wrestling event in Detroit, Michigan

- Promotional poster
- Promotion: Northern States Wrestling Alliance
- Date: December 18, 1997
- City: Detroit, Michigan
- Venue: St. Andrews Hall

Strangle-Mania chronology
← Previous; First	Next → Strangle-Mania Live Tour

Strangle-Mania Live, also marketed as NWSA/Psychopathic Strangle-Mania Live and NWSA & Psychopathic Present Strangle-Mania Live, was a professional wrestling event promoted by the Northern States Wrestling Alliance (NSWA) in collaboration with Psychopathic Records, a record label owned by the Detroit-based horrorcore hip hop duo, the Insane Clown Posse.

== Production ==
=== Background ===
On March 12, 1996, the Insane Clown Posse released a VHS tape titled ICP's Strangle-Mania, a compilation tape which featured matches from the Outrageously Violent Wrestling From Japan video collection overdubbed with commentary from the ICP themselves with Violent J (Joe Bruce) being called Diamond Donovan "3D" Douglas and Shaggy 2 Dope (Joe Utsler) being called Handsome Harley "Gweedo" Guestella. The video also featured various matches from various IWA Japan shows including Cactus Jack vs. Shoji Nakamaki, Shoji Nakamaki vs. Hiroshi Ono, and Terry Funk vs. Cactus Jack at Kawasaki Dream, Kawasaki Dream, and Headhunter A vs. Headhunter B at All I Need ~A Chance For Me~, and Leatherface and Cactus Jack vs. Hiroshi Ono and Shoji Nakamaki at A Spring Breeze ~Condition Of Victory~. The success of the video would lead Bruce and Utsler to co-produce their own wrestling show with the Northern States Wrestling Alliance (NSWA) and booker Dan Curtis titled Strangle-Mania Live which was held at St. Andrews Hall in Detroit, Michigan.

=== Aftermath ===
After the success of Strangle-Mania Live, the Insane Clown Posse teamed up with Dan Curtis again to produce a show titled Hellfire Wrestling at the Majestic Theatre in Detroit on December 27, 1998 and featured a 20 man battle royal for the Hellfire Championship as the main event. This was initially going to lead to an eighty-city Hellfire Wrestling tour, but two days after the show, Curtis had passed away in his apartment after a sudden diabetic problem. The Hellfire Wrestling tour that Insane Clown Posse and Dan Curtis planned after the first Hellfire Wrestling show was cancelled.

On December 19, 1999 the Insane Clown Posse teamed up with bookers Brian Gorie and Dave Prazak to hold the first "Juggalo Championshxt Wrestling" show which would be taped and be released as JCW Volume 1 on May 9, 2000 with commentary provided by the Insane Clown Posse as 3D and Gweedo and Madrox as Johnny Stark. The show would be main evented by the Insane Clown Posse fighting team of two Doink the Clowns (played by Tarek The Great and Truth Martini) to become the inaugural JCW Tag Team Champions. When the video was released, it lasted 38 weeks on the Billboard Sports and Recreation Top Sellers list with it charting as high as number 2 at one time. In 2000, JCW held the Strangle-Mania Live Tour in which two of the shows Cleveland and Milwaukee were featured on JCW Volume 2 which charted as high as number 2 on the Billboard Sports and Recreation Top Sellers list.

=== Storylines ===
Strangle-Mania Live featured professional wrestling matches that involves different wrestlers from pre-existing scripted feuds and storylines. Wrestlers portrayed villains, heroes, or less distinguishable characters in scripted events that built tension and culminated in a wrestling match or series of matches.

== Results ==
No.	Results	Stipulations
1	Skull Ganz defeated Don Montoya by pinfall	Double tables match
2	Tommy Starr defeated Bill Skullion by pinfall	Death match
3	Billy Bill defeated Chickenboy Cletus by pinfall	Singles match
4	Mad Man Pondo defeated Angel by pinfall	Thumbtacks match
5	Ian Rotten defeated Mad Man Pondo and Ox Harley by pinfall	Three way death match
6	Insane Clown Posse (Violent J and Shaggy 2 Dope) defeated The Chickenboys (??? & Chickenboy Cletus) by pinfall	Steel cage tag team match
