= Strangle-Mania =

Professional wrestling event produced by Juggalo Championship Wrestling

- Created by: Insane Clown Posse
- Promotions: Northern States Wrestling Alliance (1997); Juggalo Championship Wrestling (2000, 2016, 2026-present)
- First event: 1997

Strangle-Mania is a professional wrestling event produced by Juggalo Championship Wrestling (JCW), first promoted in 1997 by the Northern States Wrestling Alliance (NSWA) and most recently by JCW in 2026 under the name Strangle-Mania: Viva Las Violence.

== History ==
After the release of ICP's Strangle-Mania, a tape that featured matches from the Outrageously Violent Wrestling From Japan video collection, overdubbed with Insane Clown Posse's (Violent J and Shaggy 2 Dope) humorous commentary (as Diamond Donovan "3D" Douglas and Handsome Harley "Gweedo" Guestella) on March 12, 1996, the duo partnered with the Northern States Wrestling Alliance and their owner and booker Dan Curtis to present Strangle-Mania Live at a sold-out St. Andrews Hall in Detroit, Michigan. The show's main event featured the Insane Clown Posse (Shaggy 2 Dope and Violent J) taking on The Chickenboys (N/A and Chickenboy Cletus) in a steel cage tag team match.

On December 19, 1999 the Insane Clown Posse would team up with bookers Brian Gorie and Dave Prazak to hold the first "Juggalo Championshxt Wrestling" show which would be taped and be released as JCW Volume 1 on May 9, 2000 with commentary provided by the Insane Clown Posse as 3D and Gweedo and Twiztid's Jamie Madrox as Johnny Stark. The show would be main evented by the Insane Clown Posse fighting team of two Doink the Clowns (played by Tarek The Great and Truth Martini) to become the inaugural JCW Tag Team Champions. When the video was released, it lasted 38 weeks on the Billboard Sports and Recreation Top Sellers list with it charting as high as number 2 at one time. However, Prazak would leave the promotion due to financial issues, leaving Gordie to book a 15-day Strangle-Mania Live tour from April to May 2000 with dates spanning from Detroit, Michigan to Denver, Colorado. JCW Volume 2 would be taped in Milwaukee, Wisconsin on April 19, 2000 and in Cleveland, Ohio on May 4, 2000.

== Events ==
| Event | Date | Venue | City | Main Event |
|---|---|---|---|---|
| Strangle-Mania Live | December 18, 1997 | St. Andrews Hall | Detroit, Michigan | Insane Clown Posse (Shaggy 2 Dope and Violent J) vs. The Chickenboys (N/A and Chickenboy Cletus) in a steel cage tag team match |
| Strangle-Mania Live Tour | April 14, 2000 | Fillmore Auditorium | Denver, Colorado | Insane Clown Posse (Shaggy 2 Dope and Violent J) and DJ Willie B vs. Rainbow Coalition (Big Flame, Bob, and Neil) in a six-man tag team match |
| Strangle-Mania Live Tour | April 19, 2000 | Eagles Club | Milwaukee, Wisconsin | Insane Clown Posse (Shaggy 2 Dope and Violent J) and Evil Dead vs. (Big Flame, Bob, and Neil) |
| Strangle-Mania Live Tour | April 26, 2000 | Electric Factory | Philadelphia, Pennsylvania | Insane Clown Posse (Shaggy 2 Dope and Violent J) and Vampiro vs. The Rainbow Coalition (Big Flame, Bob, and Neil) in a six man tag team match |
| Strangle-Mania Live Tour | May 10, 2000 | Agora Theatre | Cleveland, Ohio | Abdullah The Butcher vs. The Rude Boy in a steel cage match |
| Strangle-Mania Live: Deathmatch Madness | July 21, 2016 | Legend Valley | Thornville, Ohio | Ron Matthis vs. Billy Bob vs. Bull Bronson vs. Stryknyn in a barbed wire fatal four way match |
| Strangle-Mania: Viva Las Violence | April 17, 2026 | Horseshoe Las Vegas | Paradise, Nevada | Vampiro (w/Insane Clown Posse) vs. PCO vs. Big Vito in a three way match |
(c) – refers to the champion(s) heading into the match
