= JCW Volume 1 =

1999 Juggalo Championshxt Wrestling event

- Video cover for the event
- Promotion: Juggalo Championshxt Wrestling
- Date: December 19, 1999
- City: Detroit, Michigan
- Venue: St. Andrews Hall

Juggalo Championship Wrestling event chronology
← Previous; First	Next → Strangle-Mania Live Tour

JCW Volume 1 was a professional wrestling event produced by Juggalo Championshxt Wrestling (JCW). The show took place on December 19, 1999 at St. Andrews Hall in Detroit, Michigan. This event was also the first event for Juggalo Championshxt Wrestling and was later released on home video on May 9, 2000, charting as high as number 2 on the Billboard Sports and Recreation Top Sellers list.

== Production ==
=== Background ===
On March 12, 1996, the Insane Clown Posse released a VHS tape titled ICP's Strangle-Mania, a compilation tape which featured matches from the Outrageously Violent Wrestling From Japan video collection overdubbed with commentary from the ICP themselves with Violent J (Joe Bruce) being called Diamond Donovan "3D" Douglas and Shaggy 2 Dope (Joe Utsler) being called Handsome Harley "Gweedo" Guestella. The video also featured various matches from various IWA Japan shows including Cactus Jack vs. Shoji Nakamaki, Shoji Nakamaki vs. Hiroshi Ono, and Terry Funk vs. Cactus Jack at Kawasaki Dream, Headhunter A vs. Headhunter B at All I Need ~A Chance For Me~, and Leatherface and Cactus Jack vs. Hiroshi Ono and Shoji Nakamaki at A Spring Breeze ~Condition Of Victory~, The success of the video would lead Bruce and Utsler to co-produce their own wrestling show with the Northern States Wrestling Alliance (NSWA) and booker Dan Curtis titled Strangle-Mania Live which was held at St. Andrews Hall in Detroit, Michigan. The show featured the Insane Clown Posse themselves main eventing the show against the Chickenboys in a steel cage match. On December 27, 1998, Insane Clown Posse would team up with Dan Curtis again to produce a show titled Hellfire Wrestling at the Majestic Theatre in Detroit which featured a 20 man battle royal for the Hellfire Championship as the main event. This was initially going to lead to an eighty-city Hellfire Wrestling tour, but two days after the show, Curtis had passed away in his apartment after a sudden diabetic problem. The Hellfire Wrestling tour would be cancelled. A second VHS video tape titled ICP's Strangle-Mania Volume 2 would be released on August 4, 1999 which featured several bonus matches and would also feature Twiztid's Jamie Madrox as "Lucious" Johnny Stark on commentary.

=== Storylines ===
JCW Volume 1 featured professional wrestling matches that involves different wrestlers from pre-existing scripted feuds and storylines. Wrestlers portrayed villains, heroes, or less distinguishable characters in scripted events that built tension and culminated in a wrestling match or series of matches. Storylines were produced on Juggalo Championshxt Wrestling's various events.

== Results ==
Other on-screen personnel
Role:	Name:
Commentators	Violent J (as Diamond Donovan Douglas)
Commentators	Shaggy 2 Dope (as Harvey "Gweedo" Guestella)
Commentators	Jamie Madrox (as "Luscious" Johnny Stark)
Commentators	The Rude Boy

No.	Results	Stipulations	Times
1^{D}	Don Montoya defeated 2 Tuff Tony by pinfall	Best two out of three tables match	—
2^{D}	The Freaks of Nature (Mad Man Pondo and Pete Madden) defeated Corporal Robinson and Ian Rotten by pinfall	Exploding barbed wire tag team match	—
3	The Iron Sheik defeated Izzy High by pinfall	Crackpipe on a pole match	2:07
4	Evil Dead defeated Breyer Wellington, Cash Flo, Fat Fuck Barrel Boy, Gavin Starr, Incidious, Jaimy Coxxx, Jamie Madrox, Mojo, Monoxide and Mr. Meaner, Pebble, Ricky Morton, Robert Gibson, Suburban Gangsta, Tarek The Great, The Death Dealer, The Redneck Devil Without A Cause, Tom Dub, and Truth Martini by last eliminating Ricky Morton and Robert Gibson	Battle royal for the vacant JCW Heavyweight Championship	2:24
5	Angel defeated Chick Foley by pinfall	Titties in thumbtacks match	2:15
6	King Kong Bundy defeated Tom Dub by pinfall	Singles match	1:40
7	Abdullah The Butcher defeated The Rude Boy by pinfall	Singles match	4:15
8	Insane Clown Posse (Shaggy 2 Dope and Violent J) defeated Doink The Clown (Tarek The Great) and Doink The Clown (Truth Martini) by pinfall	Tag team match for the vacant JCW Tag Team Championship	7:48
D / – this was a dark match
