= Necro Butcher =

American professional wrestler (born 1973)

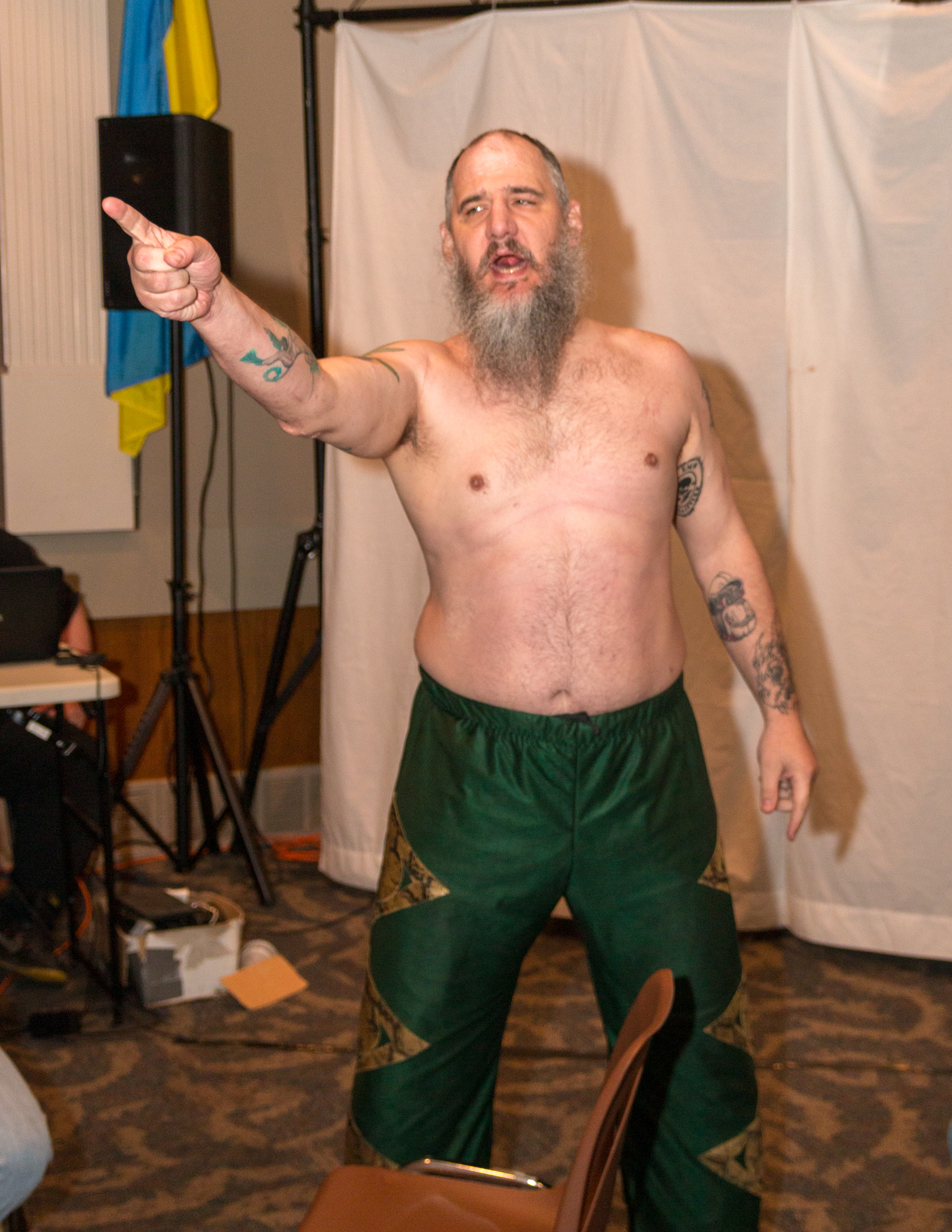
- Necro Butcher in 2014

Personal information
- Born: Dylan Keith Summers; July 13, 1973 (age 53) Pine Grove, West Virginia, U.S.
- Children: 6

Professional wrestling career
- Ring name(s): Necro Butcher; CP Munk; Pvt. Dylan Sanders; Michael Van Slyck; Dylan Summers; Pvt. Dee Summers; MAGA Butcher
- Billed height: 6 ft 2 in (1.88 m)
- Billed weight: 230 lb (104 kg)
- Billed from: Goddamn, West Virginia; By way of Virginia; Chicago, Illinois (as CP Munk)
- Trained by: Black Bart; Jay Diego
- Debut: January 2, 1998

Dylan Keith Summers (born July 13, 1973), better known by the ring name Necro Butcher, is an American professional wrestler, currently signed to WWE under a Legends contract. Throughout the years he has worked for various promotions, including Ring of Honor, Full Impact Pro, Juggalo Championship Wrestling, IWA Mid-South, Pro Wrestling Guerrilla, Big Japan Pro Wrestling, and Combat Zone Wrestling. He is known for his willingness to participate in a dangerous mix of deathmatch wrestling styles, as well as his appearance in the 2008 film The Wrestler.

== Early life ==
Dylan Keith Summers was born in Pine Grove, West Virginia, on July 13, 1973.

== Professional wrestling career ==
=== Early career (1998–2001) ===
On January 2, 1998, Summers made his professional wrestling debut after teaming with Aaron White to take on Victor Pain and Canyon. Summers, enlisted in the 20th Special Forces Group, continued to work small independent shows across Texas as "Michael Van Slyck", later changed to Sanders. On March 16, 1999, as Necro Butcher, he won his first professional wrestling championship, after defeating Damon Richards to become IHW Hardcore champion. Butcher's popularity continued to dominate Texas wrestling, and at his debut in TCW, he defeated rival Jay Diego to become the company's Hardcore champion. His success in TCW came to a halt after a dispute with its promoter. He lost the Hardcore title to Hellhammer before leaving the company. Butcher continued to build up his reputation as the most violent Death Match wrestler in Texas. On October 10, 1999, Butcher faced Mad Man Pondo for the first time. They would feud with each other in 2000.

=== IWA Mid-South (2001–2008) ===
Throughout 2001, Butcher had worked IWA Mid-South in an attempt to make a name for himself in the top independent leagues. Becoming a regular across the NWA promotions, Butcher gained widespread visibility in 2002. In July 2002, competing in IWA Mid-South, he defeated Mark Wolf, Mitch Page, 2 Tuff Tony, and finally Spyder Nate Webb to become the 2002 King of the Deathmatch. One particularly infamous match Necro had was a 200 Light Tubes deathmatch against Mad Man Pondo - a match they had seen done recently in Japan that turned out to be one of the bloodiest, goriest and most violently gruesome matches in wrestling history at IWA-MS: No Blood, No Guts, No Glory. After 10 minutes of multiple botched spots, landings on broken glass and smashing of fluorescent light tubes over each other, Necro and Pondo both ended up horrifically multilated by the mercury and carcinogen-laden light tube glass, and Necro received a deep flesh wound 2 inches wide in his left arm. Unlike the Japanese matches, glass was not cleaned out of the ring by attendants during the match and the ring was smaller than a standard wrestling ring.

Necro would go to the finals in the 2005 Strong Style Tournament, defeating Eddie Kingston and B. J. Whitmer, but losing to Chris Hero. In 2005 and 2006, Necro had two high-profile matches against both Samoa Joe and Low Ki. He lost to Joe in their first match, the main event of IWA's debut in the ECW Arena. He then went on to lose in January 2006 again to Joe. Three months later, in Low-Ki's second match in the promotion, he took out Necro. The two met in a rematch in December, where the stipulation was a tap out/knock out finish. Although Necro lost all four matches, his star remained high after taking a lot of abuse from both Joe and Ki.

In mid-2007, at IWA MS Point Proven in Philadelphia, Necro and his frequent tag team partner Toby Klein (aka The Tough Crazy Bastards) battled and were defeated by Low-Ki and Homicide. The TCB were accompanied to the ring by Halfbreed Billy Gram. Necro eventually won his first IWA gold, the Death Match title, on September 9, 2007, in Sellersburg, Indiana in a three-way dance against Corporal Robinson and Tank. He would lose the title on March 1, 2008, to Danny Havoc.

=== Combat Zone Wrestling (2002–2012) ===
His success in IWA-MS lead him to become a name attraction for hardcore oriented indy promotions in North America. For Combat Zone Wrestling, Butcher worked a program with Wifebeater, losing to him in the first Tournament of Death in 2002. Butcher returned the following year and was eliminated in round two by Ian Rotten. He reached the final at the 3rd annual Tournament of Death before finally winning Tournament of Death 4 by defeating John Zandig and Nick Gage. This victory made him the first person to win both the King of the Deathmatch and Tournament of Death. At Cage of Death VII on December 10, 2005, Necro, along with Toby Klein and Joker, took on Nick Gage, Justice Pain and John Zandig. During the match, Pain was to perform a Pain Thriller on Necro, but Necro sandbagged the move. After a second attempt, Pain threw Necro over the top rope and onto the floor. Necro got back up and returned to the ring only to have a real conflict, known as legit heat, with Pain. Necro began throwing punches and kicks landing multiple shots to the shock of officials who were watching and taking care of the other wrestlers in the cage. Both had no hard feelings after the match and the situation never continued after. Necro returned to CZW at Cage of Death XI on December 12, 2009. On April 10, 2011, he wrestled Japanese deathmatch icon Jun Kasai in a losing effort. Necro competed in the 10th Annual Tournament of Death in 2011 but was defeated by "Bulldozer" Matt Tremont in the first round.

Necro returned to CZW at Cerebral on October 13, 2012, in a losing effort against reigning CZW World Heavyweight Champion Masada.

=== Juggalo Championship Wrestling (2003–2013) ===
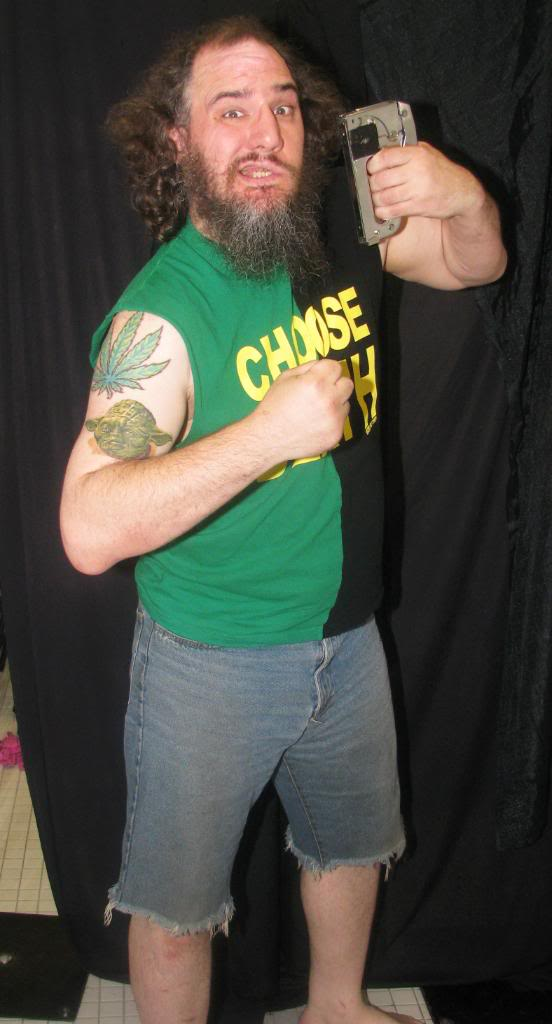
Necro Butcher posing in 2009

Summers debuted in Juggalo Championship Wrestling at the 2003 Gathering of the Juggalos where he faced "Hollywood" Chuck Hogan in a Light tube Deathmatch. The match was set to be released on video, but footage from the entire event was scrapped due to the amount of injuries sustained by the wrestlers and the rowdiness of the fans. Later that year, Summers fought Mad Man Pondo in a deathmatch which was released on JCW Volume 3. Soon after, the two men began teaming together. Summers also began appearing every year at the annual Gathering of the Juggalos, and quickly became a staple in the company.

In 2007, Summers went on tour with JCW to film the internet wrestling show SlamTV!. On the first episode, Insane Clown Posse announced that the JCW Tag Team Championship had been vacated, which caused several tag teams to emerge. Summers aligned himself with Mad Man Pondo, and the team dominated competition for several weeks. However, animosity grew between the two as miscommunication cost both members multiple matches. The following weeks saw the duo break out into fist fights, which led to a series of matches between the two. The team reunited at "East Side Wars", though, and eventually established themselves as top contenders for the vacant tag team titles. At Bloodymania, the duo won an 8 Team tag team elimination match to become the new JCW Tag Team Champions. The reign was short lived, however, as Summers signed a contract with Ring of Honor, forcing Pondo to team with several partners before losing the title at a live event in Cleveland, Ohio on January 26, 2008.

Summers returned to Juggalo Championship Wrestling at Big Ballas X-Mas Party 2009 where he teamed with Pondo to face The Thomaselli Brothers. At Bloodymania IV, Summers and Pondo lost to the team of Balls Mahoney and Hollywood Chuck Hogan. On March 9, 2011, at Hardcore Hell, the team of Summers and Mad Man Pondo defeated The Haters in a hardcore Barbed Wire, Thumbtacks, and Ladders match for their second JCW Tag Team Championship. The duo lost their championship to Ring Rydas the following month. On October 31, 2013, Butched defeated 2 Tuff Tony to win the JCW Heavyweight Championship.

=== Pro Wrestling Guerrilla (2006–2009) ===
Necro Butcher made his debut for Pro Wrestling Guerrilla on April 9, 2006, the second night of All Star Weekend 3: Crazymania, as the surprise opponent to challenge Joey Ryan for the PWG World Heavyweight Championship in a No Disqualification, Falls Count Anywhere Match. Despite the conditions being in his favor, Necro lost to Ryan who pinned him while pulling his tights.

Necro returned at the 2006 Battle of Los Angeles, competing in the tournament against Super Dragon in a No Count-Out, No Disqualification Match that was the main event of the second night on September 2. Dragon would get the win after hitting Necro with the Psycho Driver onto an open chair. Necro then wrestled in the special attraction eight-man tag team match the next night teaming with Rocky Romero and the Kings of Wrestling (Chris Hero and Claudio Castagnoli) against Colt Cabana, M-Dogg 20, Quicksilver, and Delirious. Necro's team lost when Quicksilver pinned Hero.

Necro was absent until he returned for Giant-Size Annual #4 on July 29, 2007. He was originally scheduled to compete against Kevin Steen in a Street Fight, but the no-show of the Briscoe Brothers resulted in a number of matches being changed. Necro would instead answer Bryan Danielson's open challenge and they fought in a Necro Rules Match that Danielson would win.

Necro would then compete in the 2007 Battle of Los Angeles, defeating Kevin Steen with a roll-up in a first-round tournament match on the second night on September 1, only to lose to Nigel McGuinness in a second-round tournament match the next night.

Necro became a regular member of the PWG roster through the majority of 2008, teaming with Chris Hero to defend the honor of Candice LeRae against the Human Tornado and his allies in Claudio Castagnoli and Eddie Kingston. It started with the main event of the first night of All Star Weekend 6 on January 5 with a Six-Person No Disqualification Tag Team Match that Tornado's team won when Kingston pinned Hero with the Back Drop Driver. The next night, Necro saved Candice from humiliation at the hands of Tornado before engaging in a Necro Rules Match against Claudio. Necro would win with the O'Connr Roll.

At ¡Dia De Los Dangerous! on February 24, Necro faced The Human Tornado in a one-night tournament match for the vacant PWG World Heavyweight Championship. Despite the match being contested under Necro Rules, Tornado won and would go on to win the belt by the end of the night. Necro Butcher would then face Eddie Kingston in a Necro Rules Match at Scared Straight on March 7. Again, Kingston would win despite the conditions being in Necro's favor.

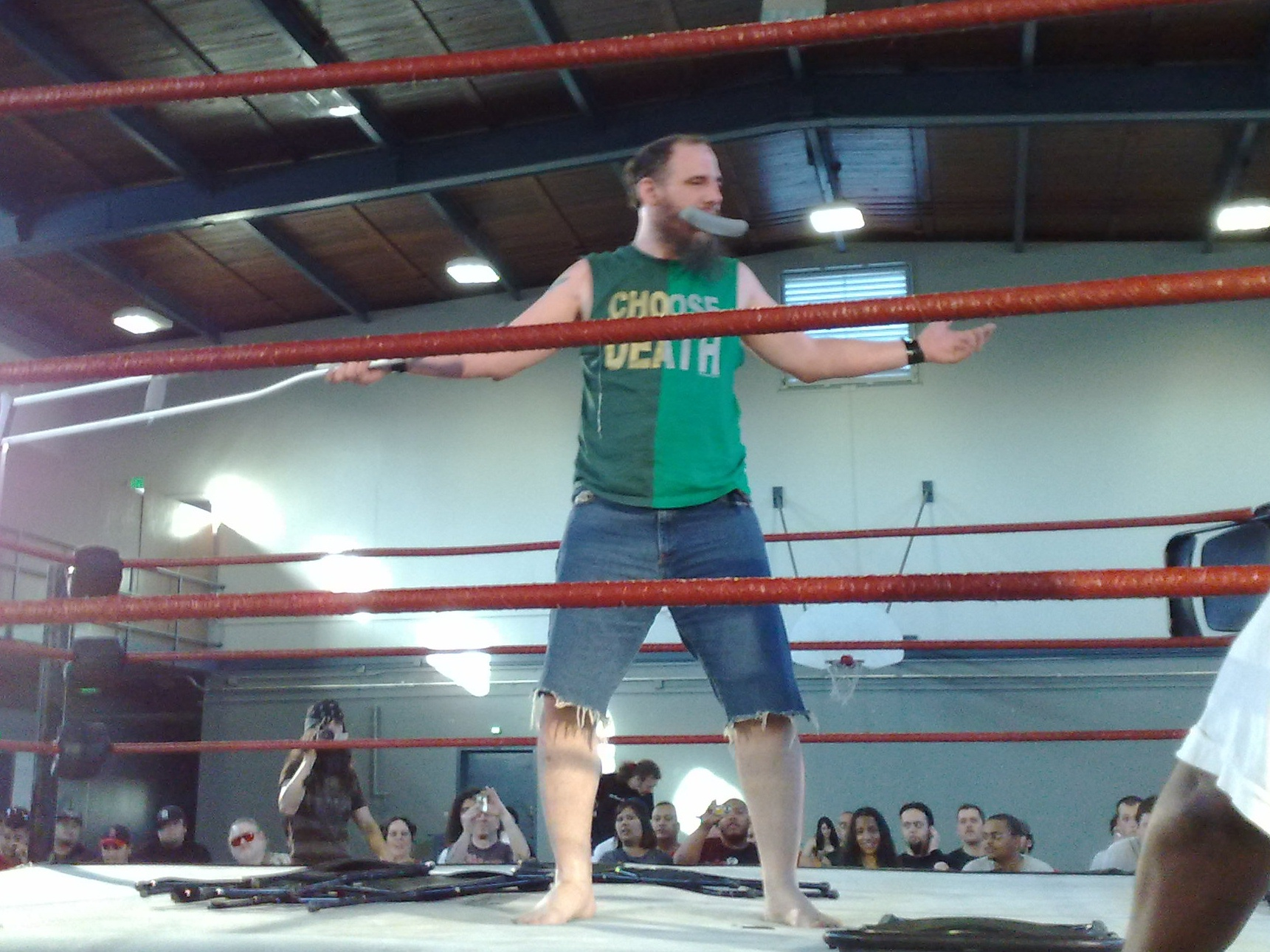
Necro Butcher in May 2008

Necro would take a break before returning on the second night of the 2008 DDT4 on May 18. He was originally scheduled to face The Human Tornado in a non-title Necro Rules Match, but Tornado suffered a serious quad injury the week prior. Tornado enlisted Jay Briscoe to take his place in a match that Necro ultimately won.

At It's It (What Is It?) on June 8, Necro was originally scheduled to team with Chris Hero to challenge Roderick Strong and Jack Evans for the PWG World Tag Team Championship. Strong suffered an injury the weekend before, so it was decided that the others would compete in a Three-Way Match to determine the Number One Contender to the PWG World Heavyweight Championship. Hero would win the match pinning Necro.

At Life During Wartime on July 6, Necro competed in a Necro Rules Match against popular Japanese comedy wrestler Kikutaro. Necro would eventually win the "Dangerous Comedy Match" when Kikutaro was knocked out as he was being pelted and buried underneath a pile of chairs that were being thrown into the ring by Necro and the fans. Necro would later help fight off Claudio Castagnoli from interfering in the main event, which saw Chris Hero defeat The Human Tornado for the PWG World Heavyweight Championship in a Steel Cage Guerrilla Warfare Match.

As a gesture of thanks for helping him, Hero granted Necro a spot in a Four-Way Match for the PWG World Heavyweight Championship on the first night of All Star Weekend 7 on August 30. The other challengers were Eddie Kingston and Low Ki. Low Ki had Necro locked in a Dragon Sleeper submission hold, but he refused to give up, which allowed Hero to successfully pin Kingston to retain the title. The next night, Necro would avenge his earlier loss to Kingston in another Necro Rules Match, pinning him with a Diving Crossbody.

Hero would once again give Necro an opportunity to go over on him in the 2008 Battle of Los Angeles as they faced each other in a non-title No Disqualification tournament match that was the main event of the first night on November 1. Hero would get the win through submission. The next night, Necro formed an unusual alliance with El Generico and Nick Jackson in a special attraction Nine-Man Three-Way Tag Team Match against the team of Joey Ryan, Chuck Taylor, and Kenny Omega as well as the team of Austin Aries, Davey Richards, and Roderick Strong. The chaotic match, made even more chaotic when the top two ropes collapsed and was later turned into an impromptu battle royal following nearly everyone chasing Omega in and out of the venue, finally ended when Richards pinned Necro under a referee fast count. When Generico and Nick Jackson could not reason with the referee, Necro smashed a chair over his head in retaliation.

Necro's appearances in PWG began to diminish in 2009. He faced Austin Aries at Express Written Consent on February 21 in a Necro Rules Match. Aries would get the win with a Brainbuster onto the chair. Necro would not return until The Secret of Guerrilla Island on June 28, losing in the main event to Joey Ryan in a Necro Rules Match. This was Necro's last appearance for the promotion as he has not returned since.

=== Ring of Honor (2006–2010) ===
Necro first wrestled in the Ring of Honor promotion in 2006. He came in as part of Chris Hero's invasion of the company, representing CZW. He had several big matches, including being part of Team CZW in the Cage of Death match at Death before Dishonor IV. His final appearance in ROH as a representative of CZW was in a No Ropes Barbed Wire Match against B. J. Whitmer.

He returned to ROH a year later in August 2007 at ROH's third pay-per-view Man Up, as part of debuting stable The Age of the Fall with Jimmy Jacobs, Tyler Black and Lacey. With barbed wire around his arm and fist, the three attacked The Briscoe Brothers. Later that night he was responsible for the end of two matches. First, he threw a chair into the ring, hitting Jack Evans as he was wrestling Tyler Black, and then he broke up an ensuing Six Man Tag Team match after punching the referee.

In early October 2007, as a result of the incident at Man Up, Butcher won two back-to-back Anything Goes Matches against Jay Briscoe. Since then Butcher has been featured in a number of high-profile 'brawling' and hardcore-style matches, including a loss to Bryan Danielson in a 'Relaxed Rules' match, losing to Jack Evans in a No Disqualification Match, losing to Kevin Steen in a Street Fight, and a loss in a 3-Way No Disqualification Match to Roderick Strong for the FIP World Heavyweight Championship. On October 25, 2008, Necro fought Go Shiozaki for the FIP World Heavyweight Championship, but lost when he and Shiozaki fought to a double count-out. Afterwards, The Age of the Fall came out and assaulted Butcher.

Necro feuded with Prince Nana's heel stable The Embassy, before turning heel himself and joining the stable in their battle against Rasche Brown on May 21, 2010. At the October 2, 2010, tapings of Ring of Honor Wrestling, Necro was defeated by Homicide in a Butcher's Rules match in his final ROH appearance before being let go by the promotion.

=== Non-deathmatch accomplishments ===
Outside of deathmatch stipulations involving weapons such as light tubes and barbed wire, Necro Butcher has also been noted for his brawling-style matches. One of the most frequently cited examples is his match against Samoa Joe at IWA Mid-South’s Something to Prove event in 2005. The bout, which relied primarily on strikes and ringside objects rather than traditional deathmatch weaponry, was characterized by its intensity and physicality and has been discussed in retrospective reviews of independent wrestling from that period.

He also competed in the Chikara Tag World Grand Prix 2005 along with Mad Man Pondo (making it to the quarter-finals before being eliminated via disqualification for illegal tactics) and has wrestled (and won) a European catch wrestling match with Chris Hero. On April 9, 2006, he challenged for the PWG World Championship, but lost to the champion Joey Ryan. Most recently, many promoters have taken note of Butcher's brawling skills and have increasingly begun to put him in non-deathmatch competitions with wrestlers he would not normally be paired up against. IWA-MS in particular has attempted matches between Butcher and Samoa Joe (twice), Homicide, Roderick Strong, Chris Hero, Super Dragon, Low Ki and Eddie Kingston.

Butcher once wrestled in Chikara as part of 'Team WWF' on their February 24, 2006, Tag World Grand Prix as CP Munk – the 'Straight Edge' Chipmunk (Almond Free, Acorn Free and Better Than You), a parody of CM Punk as it was a large chipmunk costume with 'CM Punk-style' markings (including a large Pepsi logo on his arm and tape over his fists with an 'X' drawn on each). He was partnered by 'Colt Ca-Bunny' (a parody of Colt Cabana, Punk's tag-team partner, in the form of a rabbit costume) who was actually Joker. They would defeat ROH students Matt Turner & Anthony Franco in the first round, but lose to Eddie Kingston & Sabian in the second.

Butcher also wrestled regularly for Full Impact Pro, where he first gained notoriety as both a brawler and as half of a hardcore tag-team with the "Mad Man" Pondo especially in their feud for the FIP Tag-Team Championship against The Briscoe Brothers. Since then he had memorable matches against Roderick Strong in an unsuccessful challenge for the FIP World Heavyweight Championship, and an Anything Goes match against Delirious.

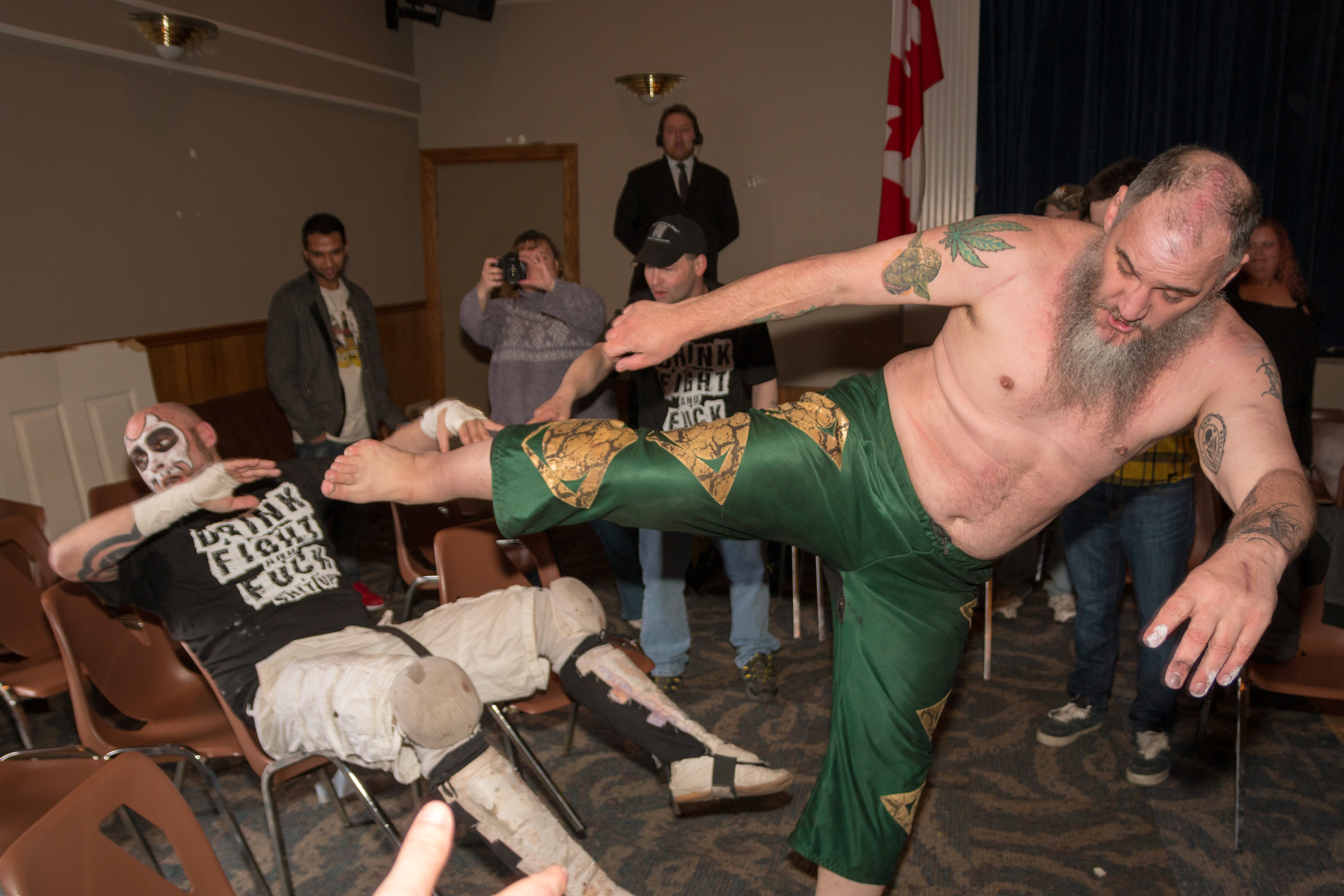
Necro Butcher hitting a superkick on a seated Warhed in 2014

Butcher participated in the first Dragon Gate show in the United States on September 5, 2008, in Bell Gardens, California. He faced "Hollywood" Stalker Ichikawa as part of the latter's Reckless Run Series in a "Dangerous Comedy Match." Butcher initially won in eighteen seconds after knocking Ichikawa out with a punch in retaliation for getting slapped in the face. Ichikawa asked for an immediate restart, and they fought a match that lasted longer until Butcher won with a Necro Bomb onto a pile of chairs.

Butcher appears often at Dallas, Texas–based Wrecking Ball Wrestling. He feuds with Skandor Akbar's men, most notably Dr. Knuckles.

Butcher has also appeared in the Queens, NY based Impact Championship Wrestling where he was defeated by Maximus Sex Power in his debut.

Butcher was also the (kayfabe) Commissioner of the NJ Based Pro Wrestling Syndicate promotion. Necro has competed for PWS from 2007–present taking on stars such as Sabu, Sandman, and The Amazing Red. He also faced New Jack in Jack's retirement match night two of PWS Supercard in April 2013.

=== Retirement and many returns (2016–present) ===
Summers' retirement match took place on June 11, 2016, in Sayreville, New Jersey, as the main event of Pro Wrestling Syndicate's Super Card 2016. Necro Butcher teamed with Grim Reefer and Smokey C in a losing effort against Sabu, Rhino, and Devon Moore.

In December 2018, it was announced that Necro Butcher would be coming out of retirement to wrestle at Game Changer Wrestling's Joey Janela's Spring Break 3 event on April 5, 2019. Since this, Necro Butcher has had several more matches including two death match losses in Japan. Necro Butcher had his final match on January 4, 2020 at ICW No Holds Barred vol. 1 where he was defeated by SHLAK. He symbolically passed the torch and also physically passed his "Choose Death" shirt to SHLAK after the match.

March 5th, 2022, Necro Butcher had his first match back after beating cancer at Total Psychopathic Wrestling’s event “187: A Tribute to the Gangsta”, a memorial and charity event in honor of wrestler New Jack’s passing. Summers would defeat TPW’s Heavyweight Champion Travis Dykes and establishing that he was back to wrestling full time.

On April 9, 2022, Necro Butcher returned again at Xtreme Pro Wrestling during the Killafornia event at Pomona. During the event, a fan threw a beer bottle at him after a match, resulting in the fan being kicked out.

=== WWE (2026–present) ===
On October 7, 2026, Summers announced on his Facebook that he was signed to WWE under a legends contract.

== Personal life ==
Summers has three sons and three daughters. The first four children (Matthew, Samantha, Kyle, and David) were with his first wife. They divorced at an unknown date, and he later became the father of Amy (born June 11, 2008) and Mary (born June 2009).

On July 1, 2020, it was revealed that Summers had Hodgkin lymphoma and was using a wheelchair. On February 2, 2021, Summers announced on his personal Facebook account that he was lymphoma-free.

== Championships and accomplishments ==
- Capital of Texas Power Wrestling
  - CTPW Heavyweight Championship (1 time)
- Championship Wrestling Association
  - CWA Hardcore Championship (1 time)
- Combat Zone Wrestling
  - CZW Ultraviolent Underground Championship (1 time)
  - CZW World Tag Team Championship (1 time) – with Toby Klein
  - CZW Tournament of Death IV
  - CZW Hall of Fame (2020)
- Fighting Ultimate Crazy King
  - Unbelievable Tag Tournament (2005, 2007) – with Mad Man Pondo
- Frontier Wrestling Alliance
  - FWA Brass Knuckles Championship (1 time)
- Independent Wrestling Association Deep-South
  - IWA Deep South Heavyweight Championship (1 time, current)
  - Carnage Cup (2006)
- Independent Wrestling Association East-Coast
  - IWA East-Coast Heavyweight Championship (1 time)
  - IWA East-Coast Tag Team Championship (1 time) – with Mad Man Pondo
- Independent Wrestling Association Mid-South
  - IWA Mid-South Deathmatch Championship (1 time)
  - King of the Deathmatch (2002)
- Insane Hardcore Wrestling
  - IHW Championship (1 time)
  - IHW Hardcore Championship (1 time)
- Insane Wrestling Federation
  - IWF Heavyweight Championship (1 time)
  - IWF Heavyweight Championship Tournament (2007)
  - Tournament of Dreams (2007)
- Jersey All Pro Wrestling
  - JAPW Tag Team Championship (2 times) – with Brodie Lee (1) and Nick Gage (1)
- Juggalo Championship Wrestling
  - JCW Heavyweight Championship (1 time)
  - JCW Tag Team Championship (2 times) – with Mad Man Pondo
- Loko Wrestling
  - Loko Deathmatch Championship (1 time, current)
- NWA Southwest
  - NWA Texas Hardcore Championship (4 times)
- Pro Wrestling All-Stars of Detroit
  - PWASD Heavyweight Championship (1 time)
- Pro Wrestling Illustrated
  - PWI ranked him #190 of the top 500 singles wrestlers in the PWI 500 in 2010
- Primos Pro Wrestling
  - Slave To The Deathmatch III (2012)
- Texas All-Star Wrestling
  - TASW Heavyweight Championship (1 time)
  - TASW Brass Knuckles Championship (2 times)
- Texas Championship Wrestling
  - TCW Hardcore Championship (2 times)
- Xtreme Intense Championship Wrestling
  - XICW Xtreme Championship (2 time)
  - Malcolm Monroe Memorial Tournament (2009)
- Xtreme Pro Wrestling
  - XPW West Coast Heavyweight Championship (1 time)
- Westside Xtreme Wrestling
  - wXw Hardcore Championship (1 time)
- Wrecking Ball Wrestling
  - Match of the year- 2009 vs Dr.Knuckles in Venus, TX )
- Wrestling Observer Newsletter
  - Best Brawler (2008, 2009)

== Media ==
- Choose Death: The Necro Butcher Story
- Choose Death: The Necro Butcher Story, Vol. 2
- Choose Death: The Necro Butcher Story, Vol. 3
- The Best of The Necro Butcher
- The Wrestler
- Card Subject to Change
