= Newport Music Hall =

Music venue in Columbus, Ohio, U.S.

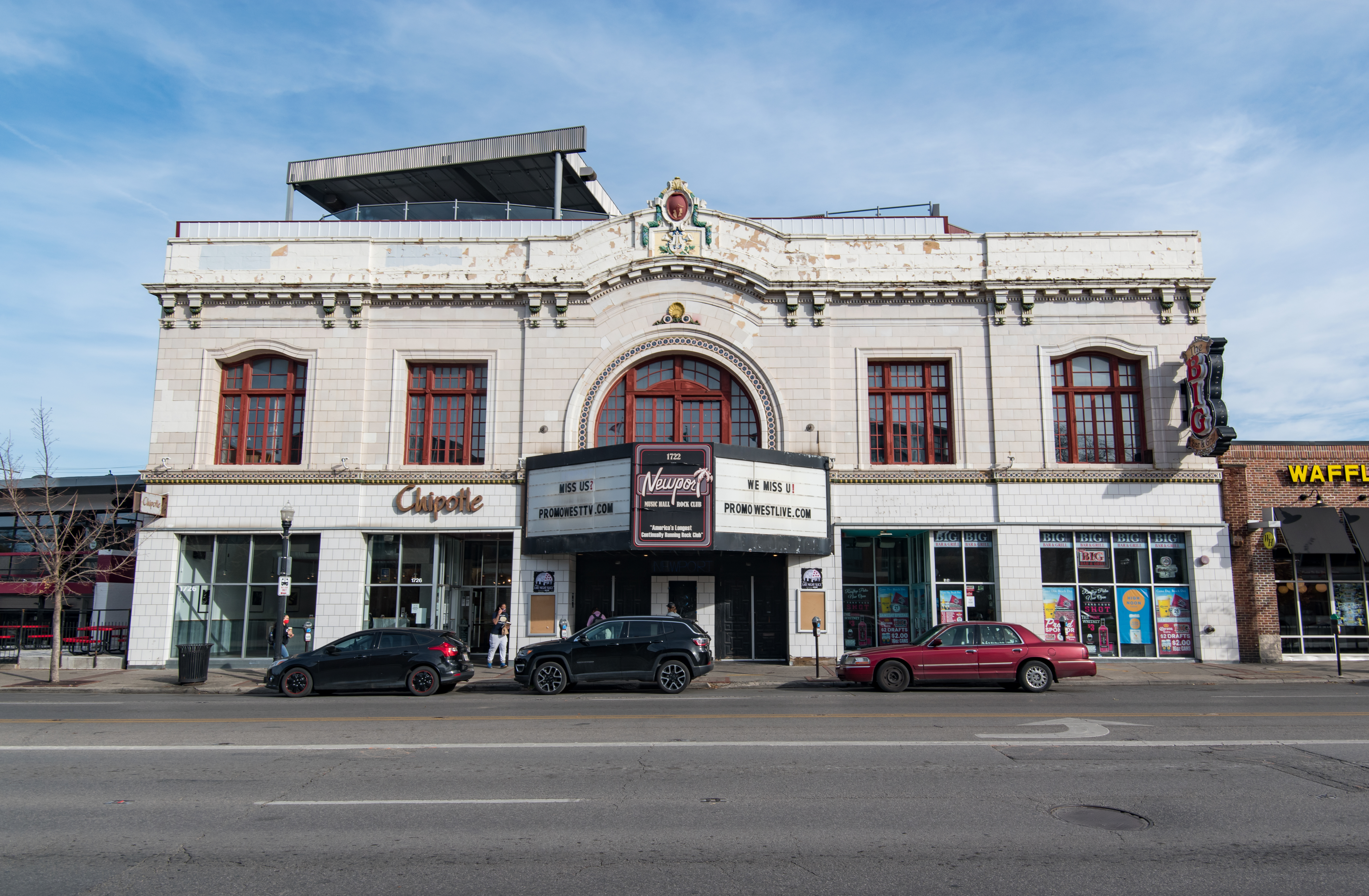
- Interactive map of Newport Music Hall
- Former names: State Theater, Agora Ballroom
- Address: 1722 North High Street, Columbus, Ohio
- Coordinates: 39.99746°N 83.00741°W
- Owner: PromoWest Productions
- Capacity: 1,700
- Current use: Live music venue
- Public transit: 1, 2, 8, 22, 31, 102
- Parking: Hourly-fee garages

Construction
- Opened: 21 December 1921

Website
- Official website

Newport Music Hall is a music venue located in the University District of Columbus, Ohio, across the street from the Ohio Union of the Ohio State University. It is "America's Longest Continually Running Rock Club".

== History ==
The venue opened in 1921, when it was known as The State Theater. In the 1970s, Hank Locanti purchased the venue and it became known as The Columbus Agora Theater & Ballroom. The hall seats 2,000 and most of the original decor is intact. It is one of the many music venues on High Street in Columbus, and the oldest continually running venue. In the past, the Agora Ballroom has had both indoor and outdoor events inclusive of Professional Wrestling events featuring 'Wild Bull Curry' & 'BoBo Brazil'.

Newport was the last American venue at which John Lee Hooker performed before his death in 2001.

The Columbus Agora Ballroom & Theatre was purchased by PromoWest in 1984, reopening as the Newport Music Hall. Located next to the campus of the Ohio State University, Newport Music Hall maintains the preservation of its historical ballroom architecture and the legacy of its past and present performers. With a 1,700 person capacity and hosting over 150,000 guests a year, the Newport Music Hall has become one of the most famous rock clubs in the country.

In 2020, the building that houses Newport was put up for sale by its owners, but it did not directly affect the venue.

== Notable performances ==
- AC/DC (1977)
- Alvvays (2024)
- Amyl and the Sniffers (2023)
- Animal Collective (2016, 2022)
- Baby Keem (2022)
- Briston Maroney (2022, 2024)
- Caroline Polachek (2023)
- Fontaines D.C. (2022)
- Good Kid (2025)
- Insane Clown Posse (2002, 2012, 2016, 2018)
- Idles (2021)
- Jack White (2024)
- JPEGMafia (2024)
- Juggalo Championship Wrestling (2003, 2008, 2024)
- Lucy Dacus (2021)
- Metallica (1985)
- NLE Choppa (2022)
- Ouija Macc (2024)
- Omar Apollo (2022)
- Peach Pit (2022)
- PUP (2019, 2022)
- Queen (1975)
- Ramones (1985, 1986, 1988, 1991, 1992, 1994)
- Remi Wolf (2022)
- Royel Otis (2024)
- Rush (1974)
- Sleigh Bells (2012, 2013, 2017, 2018, 2022)
- Teddy Swims (2022)
- The Backseat Lovers (2022)
- The Garden (2022)
- The Hives (2004, 2008, 2024)
- The Last Dinner Party (2024)
- The Regrettes (2022)
- Tom Odell (2023)
- Twenty One Pilots (2010, 2011, 2017, 2021, 2024)
- Wolf Alice 2018, 2021, 2022, 2025
- Yeat (2022)
