= Juggalo Championship Wrestling =

American independent professional wrestling promotion

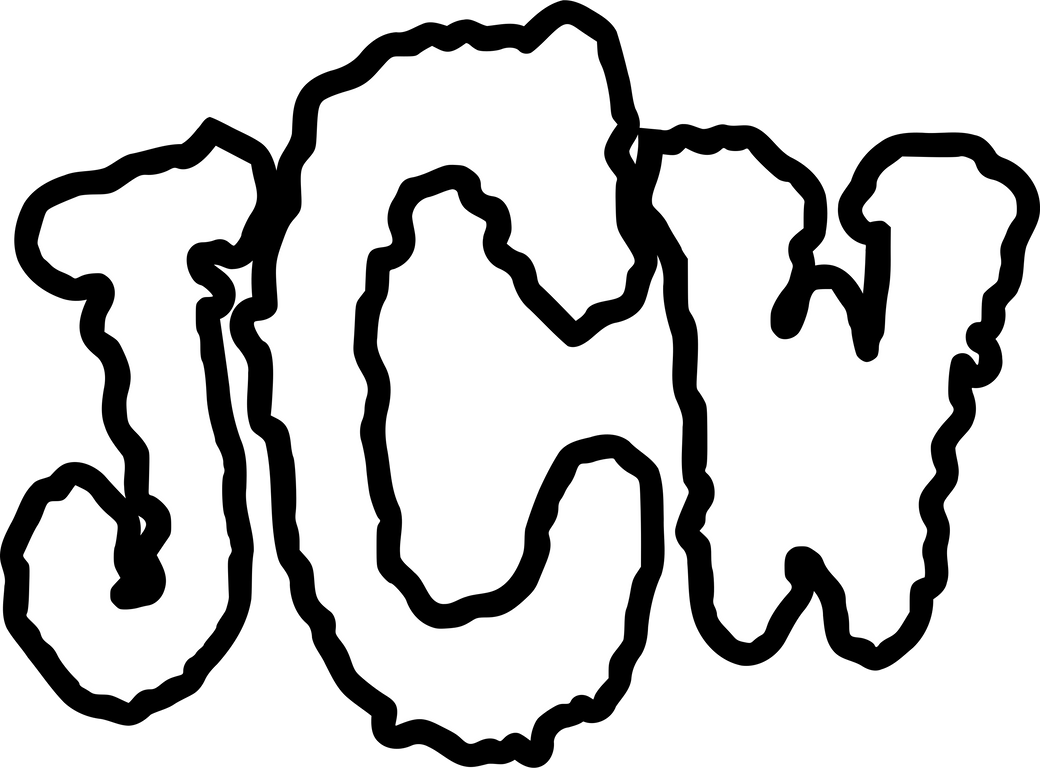
- Acronym: JCW
- Founded: December 19, 1999
- Style: Hardcore wrestling; Deathmatch wrestling
- Headquarters: Detroit, Michigan
- Founder: Insane Clown Posse
- Owner: Insane Clown Posse via. Psychopathic Records
- Formerly: Juggalo Championshit Wrestling
- Website: jcwlunacy.net

Juggalo Championship Wrestling (formerly Juggalo Championshit Wrestling) is an American independent professional wrestling promotion founded in 1999 by Violent J (Joseph Bruce) and Shaggy 2 Dope (Joseph Utsler), better known as the hip-hop duo Insane Clown Posse. JCW currently runs shows throughout the country. The video games Backyard Wrestling: Don't Try This at Home and Backyard Wrestling 2: There Goes the Neighborhood feature numerous independent wrestlers from the promotion.

The style of JCW is largely based upon hardcore wrestling. Bruce and Utsler refer to Extreme Championship Wrestling as the major influence on the company's style as well as their unique camera angles, which they compare to that of the movie Natural Born Killers; "fading in and out, and turning all over." In early years of the company, talent mostly consisted of rappers and well-known names performing under parody alternate-names. The company instituted a change in the roster after changing their name, focusing more on independent and hardcore wrestlers, as well as several established names.

JCW recorded the majority of its shows and released them in episodes of SlamTV! and on DVDs, which are sold on its online store. It launched the JCW Wrestling School with Kevin Canady as head trainer in 2010. That December, the promotion began running bi-weekly events at The Modern Exchange in Southgate, Michigan, and established a video distributing partnership with HighSpots.com. In March 2011, it launched a broadcasting website and began showing its bi-weekly events live on internet pay-per-view (iPPV). In 2024, it started doing tapings and live broadcasts of its flagship show Lunacy. On October 30, 2024, JCW made its return to pay-per-view with Devil's Night which was held at the Majestic Theatre in Detroit, Michigan and streamed on Triller TV.

== History ==
=== Strangle-Mania Live (1997) ===
On March 12, 1996, Insane Clown Posse released a VHS entitled ICP's Strangle-Mania, which featured a compilation of death matches from the Outrageously Violent Wrestling From Japan video collection, overdubbed with their own humorous commentary. Following the release, the duo, along with local Detroit booker Dan Curtis, hosted the event ICP's Strangle-Mania Live on December 17, 1997, at the sold out St. Andrew's Hall. One year later, Curtis and the group coordinated another Strangle-Mania Live type show called Hellfire Wrestling, which would be followed by an 80-city Hellfire Wrestling tour. Curtis booked the talent and wrote the scripts. "Hellfire Wrestling" sold out the Majestic Theater in Detroit. Two days after the show, Curtis was found dead in his apartment, due to a sudden diabetic problem. The Hellfire Wrestling tour was subsequently canceled.

=== Juggalo Championshit Wrestling (1999–2006) ===
An early logo advertising the company as Juggalo Championshxt Wrestling

Booked by Brian Gorie and Dave Prazak, Insane Clown Posse held the first "Juggalo Championshxt Wrestling" event on December 19, 1999, at St. Andrew's Hall in Detroit, Michigan. The event featured seven matches and included such wrestlers as The Iron Sheik, King Kong Bundy, and Abdullah the Butcher. Insane Clown Posse defeated the team of two Doink the Clowns to become the first JCW Tag Team Champions, and Evil Dead won a Hardcore Battle royal to be crowned the first JCW Heavyweight Champion. The event was filmed and released as JCW Vol. 1 on May 9, 2000. Lasting 38 weeks on the Billboard Sports and Recreation Top Sellers list, the video charted as high as number 2. Prazak, however, left the company over financial issues, leaving Gorie to solely book the company.

In April and May 2000, Gorie booked a 15-city Strangle-Mania Live Tour, spanning from Detroit to Denver. The tour focused less on older wrestlers and featured more younger talent such as Chris Hero and Mad Man Pondo. JCW Vol. 2 was filmed during tour stops in both Cleveland and Milwaukee, and was released on July 23, 2001. The video charted as high as number 8 on the Billboard Sports and Recreation Top Sellers list. The promotion later held several matches at the first annual Gathering of the Juggalos, which it has continued to do ever since. Brian Gorie left the company shortly after, and Bruce and Utsler took full control of booking the events themselves.

On August 21, 2000, the company received mainstream exposure when wrestler Vampiro, who was also the JCW Heavyweight Champion, brought the title out with him on World Championship Wrestling's nationally televised WCW Monday Nitro. He proceeded to proclaim that the JCW Heavyweight Championship was the only world title that meant anything to him before giving Tank Abbott a match for the title. The match was called by Bruce and Utsler, called under their "3D" and "Gweedo" personas, who also interfered in the match to cost Abbott the championship.

In 2002, the promotion was the second highest grossing wrestling organization in the United States. The same year, Bruce and Utsler set plans to record matches for JCW Vol. 3 at the 2002 Gathering of the Juggalos. However, due to the amount of injuries sustained by the wrestlers and the rowdiness of the fans, the footage was scrapped. Another event was scheduled the following year on March 16, 2003 in Columbus, Ohio and filmed at the Newport Music Hall for the video. The event continued to bring in younger talent such as M-Dogg 20, Josh Prohibition, Nosawa, and Necro Butcher. JCW Vol. 3 was released on DVD on November 11 of that year. Two weeks later, JCW Vol. 1 and JCW Vol. 2 were both individually re-released onto the DVD format.

=== Name change and development (2007–2010) ===
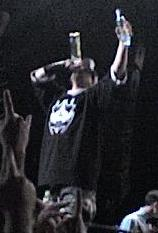
2 Tuff Tony during season one of SlamTV!

Following the release of the first three JCW videos, the company sporadically began referring to itself as Juggalo Championship Wrestling. On July 16, 2007, the company updated its website, changing all references of itself to Juggalo Championship Wrestling. Their logo, however, continued to display the words "Juggalo Championshit Wrestling" until late 2008. In late 2006, the company began a three-month cross-promotional rivalry with Philadelphia-based promotion Pro Wrestling Unplugged. The relationship between the companies continued after the events, as PWU owner Tod Gordon allowed multiple wrestlers to compete for JCW in their upcoming tour.

In March 2007, the company began filming the internet wrestling program SlamTV! on Insane Clown Posse's twenty-two city tour entitled the Tempest Release Party. The episodes lead up to the first annual Bloodymania wrestling event, which was held at that year's Gathering of the Juggalos. The programming featured an array of independent wrestlers, including Human Tornado, Zach Gowen, The Thomaselli Brothers, and Trent Acid, as well as several well-known wrestlers, such as The Great Muta, Justin Credible, 2 Cold Scorpio, and Scott Hall. Both the first season and Bloodymania were released on DVD later that year, and became the first wrestling videos ever sold throughout the entire Hot Topic store chain.

The post-season saw the formation of the group Juggalo World Order. Season two of SlamTV! was filmed on the Slam TV Tour 2008. While shorter than the first season, the programming introduced notable manager Scott D'Amore and wrestler Raven, as well as the JCW Tag Team Tournament with eight teams. On May 17, 2008, Juggalo Championship Wrestling hosted matches at the inaugural Hatchet Attacks. At the following year's event, the company held its first women's wrestling match in a decade. Both Bloodymania III and Bloodymania IV were held in the following two years with no build up from full SlamTV! seasons.

=== Running full-time (2010–present) ===
In January 2010, the company announced plans to run full-time and launched the JCW Wrestling School with Kevin Canady as head trainer. That August, Juggalo Championship Wrestling began a video distributing partnership with HighSpots.com. On December 22, the promotion began running biweekly events at The Modern Exchange in Southgate, Michigan. All shows are planned to be taped and released on DVD. Scott Hall was made Executive Consultant to Juggalo Championship Wrestling in February 2011. Later that month, Vampiro came out of retirement and returned as both a wrestler and a company consultant. He raised hopes of developing talent, taking the company international, and, more specifically, bringing it to Latin America.

The company held its first internet pay-per-view, called Hatchet Attacks, on March 26, 2011. The event was filmed and shown live online by the venue The Rave. Juggalo Championship Wrestling later launched its own broadcasting website for its bi-weekly events, and transmitted its first self-produced internet pay-per-view on April 6. JCW would go on to hold more self-produced internet pay-per-views on April 20, May 4, May 18, June 30, July 20 and 28, 2011. The "F*ck The Police" internet pay-per-view would prove to be their final internet pay-per-view until holding another in May 2012 at the Hatchet Attacks supershow. The 2012 Gathering of the Juggalos was heavily hyped for a first ever face-off between Corporal Robinson and The Rude Boy, both JCW legends. The match did not take place as planned due to Corporal Robinson being released from JCW, with Psychopathic Records officially announcing that Robinson had departed from the company. At the 2013 Gathering of the Juggalos it was announced that Evil Dead and Mad Man Pondo were inducted into the new JCW Hall of Fame, being the first two inductees.

On June 10, 2024, the company announced that they would be launching a new series called Lunacy. Initially airing on a bi-weekly basis before switching to being a weekly show, Lunacy premiered on August 28, 2024.

In February 2025, JCW content was added to Highspots TV including various DVD events, pay-per-views, and SlamTV! episodes.

On October 26, 2025, it was announced that Vince Russo, a high-profile pro wrestling writer and booker, was announced as an investor in JCW.

On July 16, 2026, JCW launched a new website with the URL jcwlunacy.net.

== Partnerships ==
=== World Championship Wrestling (1999–2000) ===
On August 9, 1999, the Insane Clown Posse would make their World Championship Wrestling debut on Monday Nitro in a six man tag team match with future JCW Heavyweight Champion Vampiro against Lash LeRoux, Norman Smiley, and Prince Iaukea. and would continue making in-ring appearances on various WCW shows. On the August 21, 2000 episode of Nitro, the Insane Clown Posse accompanied Vampiro to who brought the JCW Heavyweight Championship to the ring and claim the title was the only title he ever cared about. Insane Clown Posse would be on commentary for a match which would see Vampiro defend the JCW Heavyweight Championship against Tank Abbott.

=== Total Nonstop Action Wrestling (2005–2009, 2024–present) ===
On January 21, 2004, the Insane Clown Posse made their Total Nonstop Action Wrestling debut on the January 21, 2004 NWA Total Nonstop Action pay-per-view in which the duo would intervene in the main event of the show, which was TNA owner Jeff Jarrett vs. El Leon, by spraying Faygo in Jarrett's eyes when the two wrestlers were fighting in the crowd. One week later, the duo were interviewed in the ring by Mike Tenay. The duo explained that they were fans of TNA, and that they wanted to be a part of the promotion themselves. As soon as they made (kayfabe) negative remarks toward Jeff Jarrett, Glenn Gilberti and David Young interrupted and tried to convince the duo to apologize to Jeff Jarrett, however, the Insane Clown Posse would chase Gibereti and Young out of the ring before challenging them to a tag team match the following week. On the February 4, 2004 NWA Total Nonstop Action pay-per-view, the duo would defeat Young and Gilberti and later that night, in an interview with Scott Hudson, the duo would issue a challenge to opponents of Jeff Jarrett's choosing to a "Juggalo Street Fight". Two weeks later, the duo would fight Kid Kash and Glen Gilberti and would get the victory against them. On the March 10, 2004 NWA Total Nonstop Action pay-per-view, America's X Cup Special II, the duo would team up with JCW wrestler 2 Tuff Tony and would fight Kash, Gilberti, and Young in a six man tag team match, however the trio would end up losing to Kash, Gilberti, and Young. During the duo's stint in TNA, the Insane Clown Posse brought in the largest comped ticket crowds in TNA history at the time. After leaving the promotion, the duo would continue to work with TNA on various events including three JCW vs. TNA shows at the 2005 Gathering of the Juggalos music festival. Notable TNA wrestlers who would apppear at the festival were Abyss, America's Most Wanted, Team Canada, Rhino, D-Ray 3000, and Ron Killings.

The Insane Clown Posse would also book and promote TNA's first house show on March 17, 2006 at the Compuware Sports Arena in Plymouth, Michigan in which they would take on Team Canada members Eric Young and Petey Williams.

On October 30, 2024, during JCW's Devil's Night pay-per-view, TNA World Champion Nic Nemeth would bring the title to the show in a non title match against Kerry Morton. Other TNA wrestlers also have made appearances on JCW in recent years including Nemeth again at the JCW vs. GCW: The 2 Day War pay-per-view, first to attack Atticus Cogar after a six man tag team match between VNDL48 and Flowe Caine and Luigi Primo. and then the following day when he would fight against Atticus Cogar in a "know your enemy" match. Moose would also have two matches with JCW on the July 14, 2025 and July 17, 2025 episodes of JCW Lunacy against Colby Corino and Kongo Kong. After making his return to TNA, EC3 would also make his JCW debut on the April 16, 2025 episode of JCW Lunacy in which he would be announced as a special guest referee in a four way elimination match for the JCW Heavyweight Championship, which would also feature Nic Nemeth, at Strangle-Mania: Viva Las Violence.

=== Pro Wrestling Unplugged (2006–2009, 2026–present) ===
In late 2006, the company started a three-month cross-promotional rivalry with Philadelphia-based promotion Pro Wrestling Unplugged in which wrestlers representing their respective promotions would be featured on several shows between the two promotions including four cross-promotional shows titled PWU vs. JCW, Vendetta, Cuffed and Caged, and Raven's Revenge?. The partnership between the companies would continue after the events, as PWU owner Tod Gordon allowed multiple wrestlers to compete for JCW in their Tempest Release Party tour which would be taped as part of the first season of SlamTV!. During the tour, the PWU Hardcore Championship would change hands on February 25, 2006 as Tracy Smothers would win the title after defeating Corporal Robinson.

On Strangle-Mania: Viva Las Violence, part owners of Pro Wrestling Unplugged, The BackSeat Boyz (2023) (JP Grayson and Tommy Grayson) would be added to a "freak show" tag team match against the Brothers of Funstruction (Yabo The Clown and Ruffo The Clown) and the Outbreak (Jacksyn Crowley and Abel Booker).

=== IWA Mid-South (1999–2018) ===
IWA Mid-South owner Ian Rotten had a long-standing connection with the Insane Clown Posse since Strangle-Mania Live on December 18, 1997 when he fought Mad Man Pondo and Ox Harley in a three way death match. Prior to JCW's launch, several future members of JCW's roster would compete on several IWA Mid-South shows including 2 Tuff Tony, Cash Flo, Ian Rotten, Corporal Robinson, Mean Mitch Page (also known as Fat Fuck Barrel Boy), Mad Man Pondo, and Violent J himself. On September 8, 2007, the JCW Tag Team Championship would be defended on an IWA Mid-South show for the first time at Kings of Extreme when Mad Man Pondo and Necro Butcher defended the title against Corporal Robinson and Dysfunction.

=== National Wrestling Alliance (2023–present) ===
On June 3, 2023 during the Crockett Cup, JCW Tag Team Champions, the Brothers of Funstruction, would be featured as participants on the tournament. They would advance to the second and quarter-final rounds after defeating The Fixers (Jay Bradley and Wrecking Ball Legursky) and A Cut Above (Rhett Titus and Thom Latimer) on the first night of the tournament, however, they would be defeated by Los Jinetes del Aire (Myzteziz Jr. and Octagon Jr.).

The Brothers of Funstruction would make their NWA Powerrr debut on the July 11, 2023 episode and would fight against La Rebellion (Bestia 666 and Mecha Wolf).

On August 26, 2023, during the NWA 75 pay-per-view, Violent J would become the manager of the Brothers of Funstruction in the NWA and would accompany the team to the ring against Magnum Muscle (Mims and Dak Draper). The team would also fight against La Rebellion accompanied by Vampiro. On October 28, 2023, during the Samhain pay-per-view, Violent J would team up with the Brothers of Funstruction against La Rebellion (Bestia 666 and Mecha Wolf) and Vampiro in a six man tag team Riddlebox match.

On February 23, 2024 during the first night of Juggalo Weekend, the Southern Six (Kerry Morton, Silas Mason, and Alex Taylor) would debut in a battle royal for the JCW Heavyweight Championship. The stable would be frequent members of the JCW roster throughout 2024 and into 2025 beginning with the debut episode of JCW Lunacy. On the September 28, 2024 episode of JCW Lunacy, James Storm and Kerry Morton would win the JCW Tag Team Championship after defeating the Brothers of Funstruction. They would lose the titles to The Backseat Boyz (2023) (Tommy Grayson and JP Grayson) on the following episode. On August 13, 2024 at JCW's Free-For-All show, Alex Taylor would defend the NWA World Junior Heavyweight Championship against Crazzy Steve.

In addition to the Southern Six, NWA commentator Joe Galli would be brought on as a lead commentator for JCW Lunacy's early episodes and on the Devil's Night pay-per-view along with Danny Dealz at the 2024 Gathering of the Juggalos.

=== Game Changer Wrestling (2024–present) ===
On September 14, 2024, at Game Changer Wrestling's Bad One pay-per-view in Detroit, Violent J accompanied a six-man tag team consisting of 2 Tuff Tony, Breyer Wellington, and Mad Man Pondo against Thrunt (1 Called Manders, Dark Sheik, and Effy) in a six man tag team match. Even though they lost the match, Violent J would issue a challenge to GCW to a "2 day war" at the Gathering of the Juggalos the following year. Several exhibition matches on both GCW and JCW shows would take place throughout late 2024 and into early 2025. On January 21, 2025 during The People vs. GCW kickoff show, Violent J would accompany 2 Tuff Tony and the Backseat Boyz (Tommy Grayson and JP Grayson) to a pre-show rumble in which 2 Tuff Tony was the fourth wrestler to be eliminated in the rumble by former JCW Heavyweight Champion Shane Mercer.

A JCW exhibition six man tag team match between the Backseat Boyz (Tommy Grayson and JP Grayson) and The Wraith against Dani Mo and the Brothers of Funstruction (Yabo The Clown and Ruffo The Clown) was held on GCW's Amerikaz Most Wanted pay-per-view on March 30, 2025 in Sauget, Illinois which featured Violent J on commentary along with JCW's ring announcer, The Ringmaster. Violent J would also accompany 2 Tuff Tony and Mickie Knuckles who would fight against The Rejects (John Wayne Murdoch and Reed Bentley) in the main event of the show.

On April 20, 2025, during Joey Janela's Spring Break: Clusterf**k Forever, Mickie Knuckles, 2 Tuff Tony, the Brothers of Funstruction (Yabo The Clown and Ruffo The Clown), the Backseat Boyz (Tommy Grayson and JP Grayson), and Dani Mo entered into the Clusterf**k Battle Royal representing JCW in which they had taken control of the ring for a brief period before Matt Tremont, Bam Sullivan, Big Joe, Lou Nixon, Dr. Redacted, and John Wayne Murdoch would enter as Team GCW and would brawl backstage during the match. Effy, Jimmy Lloyd, Joey Janela, and Sonny Kiss would represent Team GCW on various episodes of JCW Lunacy.

During GCW's Cage of Survival 4 on June 8, 2025, an eight man tag team match would be scheduled between Team JCW (2 Tuff Tony, Mickie Knuckles, Ruffo The Clown, and Yabo The Clown) against Team GCW (Effy, Jimmy Lloyd, John Wayne Murdoch, and Matt Tremont) in which the match would be declared a no contest and escalate into a riot which move from the venue to the streets outside the Showboat.

On July 17, 2025, JCW and GCW would hold a pay-per-view event titled GCW x JCW Showcase Showdown: The Violence is Right in which the main event would be Mad Man Pondo defending the JCW Heavyweight Championship against Matt Tremont in a death match. During the match, GCW owner Brett Lauderdale would intervene as a referee and would give Tremont the victory and become JCW Heavyweight Champion for the first time.

On August 1, 2025, JCW would be featured in GCW's SummerSmash Weekend event as part of SummerSlam 2025 weekend and would present their Powder Keg pay-per-view during the event. The event would feature a GCW Tag Team Championship match and a Team GCW vs. Team JCW Hall of Famers match as the main event. During the main event, GCW wrestler John Wayne Murdoch was set on fire after being suplexed through a burning table by Mad Man Pondo and was rushed to the hospital as a result.

From August 14 to 15, 2025, JCW and GCW presented The 2 Day War at the 2025 Gathering of the Juggalos which would consist of several matches pitting JCW wrestlers against GCW wrestlers. During the first night's main event, the Brothers of Funstruction would lose the JCW Tag Team Championship to YDNP (Jordan Oliver and Alec Price) in which both the JCW and GCW tag team championships would be on the line. On the second night's main event, 2 Tuff Tony would win the JCW Heavyweight Championship after defeating Matt Tremont in a barbed wire death match. On September 13, 2025, during GCW's Evil Deeds, the Brothers of Funstruction would win back the JCW Tag Team Championship but would also win the GCW Tag Team Championships after defeating YDNP in a Riddlebox match.

On April 17, 2026, JCW would hold its first Collective show at Horseshoe Las Vegas in Paradise, Nevada. Titled Strangle-Mania: Viva Las Violence, the show would feature Vampiro taking on PCO and Big Vito in a three way match which would also be Vampiro's final match.

=== Various international and independent partnerships (1999–present) ===
Since 1999, various JCW wrestlers would compete on various independent wrestling shows throughout North America. On March 18, 2000, Evil Dead and the Insane Clown Posse would team up in a six man tag team match against Big Flame, Bob, and Neil at a Maryland Championship Wrestling show in Emmitsburg, Maryland On October 5, 2002, the Insane Clown Posse would wrestle in a dark match against the Outcast Killaz (Diablo Santiago and Oman Tortuga) on Ring of Honor's Glory by Honor. Various JCW wrestlers have continued to make appearances at Ring of Honor show to this day including Facade and Alice Crowley.

On December 12, 2004, the Insane Clown Posse and the Rude Boy teamed up in a six man tag team match against former JCW Heavyweight Champion Breyer Wellington, Corporal Robinson, and Zach Gowen on Border City Wrestling's A Night of Appreciation for Sabu, a charity show held to raise funds for former JCW Heavyweight Champion, Sabu.

During the inaugural Bloodymania on August 12, 2007, a tag team consisting of two All Japan Pro Wrestling wrestlers (Brute Issei and Akira Raijin) competed in an eight team tag team elimination match for the vacant JCW Tag Team Championship.

During Triplemanía XXXII in Tijuana, Baja California, Mexico on June 15, 2024, Violent J accompanied Mecha Wolf to the ring as he fought against Rey Horus and Bestia 666 in a three-way match. During a three-way trios match, Willie Mack brought out the JCW Heavyweight Championship, despite it not being defended during the event.

== SlamTV! ==
The logo used for SlamTV!

SlamTV! is an internet wrestling show, broadcast by the Insane Clown Posse's wrestling promotion Juggalo Championship Wrestling. It features color commentary by "Handsome Harley 'Gweedo' Guestella" (Shaggy 2 Dope) and "Diamond Donovan '3D' Douglas" (Violent J), with "Luscious" Johnny Stark (Twiztid's Jamie Madrox) filling in whenever needed. Its initial run was 20 episodes, taped on a nationwide tour entitled "The Tempest Release Party". Until its creation, aside from three initial DVDs, the only way to view JCW was in person or home videos.

== Lunacy ==
The logo for JCW Lunacy

Lunacy is an internet wrestling show produced by the Insane Clown Posse's Juggalo Championship Wrestling promotion. It featured commentary from Joe Galli and Manny Fresh for its first eight episodes along with a rotating list of guest commentators. Joe Dombrowski and Zac Amico provided commentary for the livestreamed shows as part of the Insane Clown Posse's Train of Terror Tour and have remained as the primary commentators for Lunacy. with Mark Roberts joining on December 4, 2024 and Veda Scott joining on September 11, 2025.

In December 2025, the brand introduced a redesigned championship belt to commemorate the new era and show the Lunacy attachment.

== Events ==
JCW events have been held since 1999 beginning with JCW Volume 1 and have been released or aired on various different formats including home video, pay-per-view, and livestreaming either as a stand-alone event or as episodes of SlamTV! or JCW Lunacy.

== Style and production ==
Juggalo Championship Wrestling was founded largely upon hardcore wrestling, but has since blended it with the Puroresu and high flying Lucha libre wrestling styles. Their roster features a mix of independent and veteran performers. Corporal Robinson, wrestler and creative writer for the company, calls the product "totally different than your average wrestling show. It's got crazy and outlandish characters, it's got hard hitting hardcore matches, it's got music, it's got your high flyers. It's got a little taste of every flavor."

Along with their unique blend of wrestling styles, several other aspects of the company have drawn comparisons to Extreme Championship Wrestling. Alex Marvez of Scripps Howard News Service has drawn parallels between the two companies' energetic fans. 1wrestling Radio host Bruce Wirt calls Juggalo Championship Wrestling a "modern day [and] better version of ECW" because of their fan base, wrestling styles, and original stories. Insane Clown Posse themselves refer to Extreme Championship Wrestling as the major influence on the company's style as well as their unique camera angles, which they compare to that of the movie Natural Born Killers; "fading in and out, and turning all over."

Bruce Wirt praises the company as an alternative to WWE and Total Nonstop Action Wrestling due to its unique characteristics. Juggalo Championship Wrestling features a live musical performance at each wrestling event, leading Wirt to compare the combination to that of WWE's Rock 'n' Wrestling Connection. Shaggy 2 Dope and Kevin Gill provide commentary, which has been described as sometimes politically incorrect and "sidesplittingly funny." Notably, the company also does not have rematch clauses; instead, it forces former champions to wrestle their way back up to the main event.

== Broadcasts ==
Juggalo Championship Wrestling began its first broadcast with the internet wrestling program SlamTV! Running from April 7, 2007, to August 4, 2008, the program aired 21 episodes in two seasons. The video release of the first season was the first wrestling DVD ever sold at the entire Hot Topic store chain. A brief series called Slam TV Express later ran for three episodes from May 25 to June 4, 2010.

On March 26, 2011, the company produced its first live internet pay-per-view (iPPV), called Hatchet Attacks. Juggalo Championship Wrestling began broadcasting bi-weekly iPPV events on April 6. The company ran most its events at The Modern Exchange in Southgate, Michigan, in what are considered television tapings. Major events occur every several weeks at concert venues throughout the United States. Annual shows included Hatchet Attacks, Oddball Wrestling, Flashlight Wrestling, Hallowicked After Party, Hallowicked, Juggalo Weekend, Big Ballas' X-Mas Party, and the company's premier wrestling event Bloodymania.

Currently, the company broadcasts a weekly show on YouTube called Lunacy along with occasional pay-per-view events on Triller TV.

== Championships and accomplishments ==
=== Current champions ===
Note: Tables with a "Days rec." column means that Juggalo Championship Wrestling officially recognizes a different number of days that a wrestler has held a title, generally due to an event airing on tape delay.

Championship	Current champion(s)	Reign	Date won	Days held	Days rec.	Location	Notes	Ref.
JCW World Heavyweight Championship	Caleb Konley	2	November 13, 2026	8	2	New Orleans, Louisiana	Defeated Nic Nemeth at Lunacy Skankfest. Aired on November 19, 2026.	
JCW Women's Championship	Dani Mo	2	May 24, 2026	181	156	Lansing, Michigan	Defeated J-Rod in a ladder match at Lunacy: Mayday! On the Front Lines. Aired on June 18, 2026.	
JCW American Championship	Facade	2	October 11, 2026	41	16	Detroit, Michigan	Defeated Father Bronson at Lunacy Shocktober Slam. Aired on November 5, 2026.	
JCW Battle Royal Championship	Bulk Rogan	1	September 24, 2026	58	58	Jeffersonville, Indiana	Won a 20-person Country Time Rumble match at JCW Carnival of Chaos.	
JCW World Tag Team Championship	Luciano Family (Vincenzo and Sally Boy)	1	October 31, 2026	21	9	Detroit, Michigan	Defeated champions Choppa City (Atiba and Bruce Wayans), Juggalo World Order (2 Tuff Tony and Willie Mike), and The Boneheads (Rah and Ugh) at Hallowicked 2026.	

== See also ==
- Extreme Championship Wrestling
