= Hardcore wrestling =

Professional wrestling genre

Hardcore wrestling is a form of professional wrestling where disqualifications, count-outs, and all other rules do not apply. Taking place in usual or unusual environments, hardcore wrestling matches allow the use of numerous foreign objects as improvised weapons, including ladders, Singapore canes, tables, chairs, thumbtacks, barbed wire, light tubes, shovels, glass, and baseball bats (sometimes wrapped in barbed wire). Although hardcore wrestling is a staple of most wrestling promotions, where they are often used at the climaxes of feuds, some promotions (such as Big Japan Pro Wrestling, International Wrestling Syndicate, IWA Mid-South, Game Changer Wrestling, Combat Zone Wrestling) specialize in hardcore wrestling, with many matches performed in this manner.

Hardcore wrestling was first acknowledged as a major wrestling style in Japan with promotions such as Frontier Martial-Arts Wrestling and W*ING. It then became successful in America with Extreme Championship Wrestling. World Wrestling Federation/Entertainment capitalized on the success and introduced the WWF Hardcore Championship in the 1990s, then soon began to turn those matches into comedy skits. Hardcore contrasts with traditional mat-based wrestling, where solid technical skills are preferred over hardcore's stuntworks, sweat, gore, and shock value.

== History ==
=== Early history ===
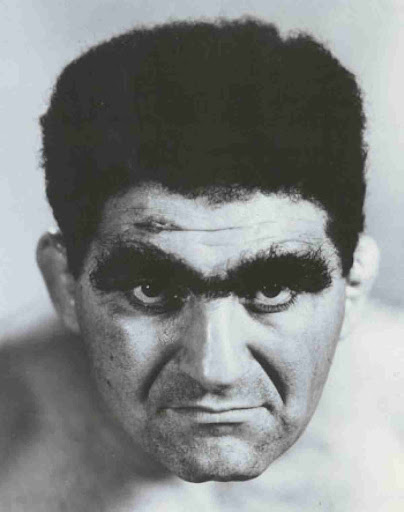
Bull Curry was an innovator in hardcore wrestling.

In the 1930s in the United Kingdom, All-in professional wrestling became popular and it contained weapons being used in matches. This led to professional wrestling being banned in the UK until 1947. As professional wrestling entered the mid 20th century, promoters and performers looked for ways to heighten audience excitement. Blood, while initially taboo, was found to be a significant draw, and the advent of the now common "no holds barred" match marked the beginning of what is now known as hardcore wrestling. Methods were devised for wrestlers to make themselves bleed purposefully as part of their performance. During the 1950s and 1960s wrestlers such as "Wild Bull" Curry, "Classy" Freddie Blassie, Dory Funk, Sr. and Giant Baba were among those who introduced the bloody brawling style which caught on in Japan and the American South. New match types were devised that resembled street fighting, such as matches which were held in a cage, Texas Deathmatches which incorporated weapons, and Lights Out matches which were 'unsanctioned' and took place after the rest of the scheduled card, once the house lights had briefly been turned off to signify the end of the event. The National Wrestling Alliance had brass knuckles championships in the Texas and Florida territories, dating from the 1950s. (The Texas title was taken by World Class Championship Wrestling when it split away.)

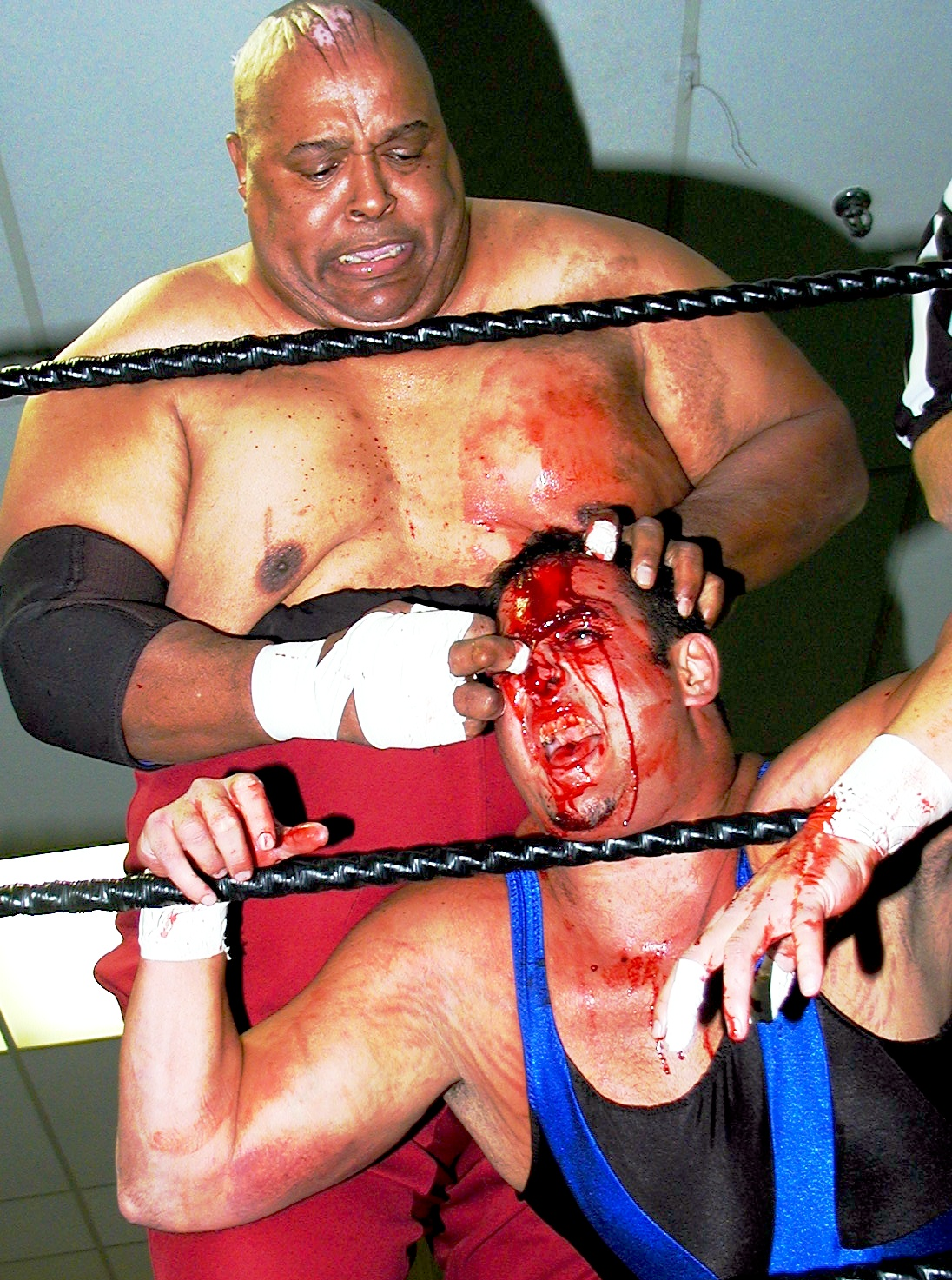
Abdullah the Butcher during a hardcore match

Brawling continued to evolve and grow in popularity in America through the 1960s, 1970s and 1980s. The Detroit territory was home to The Sheik, Abdullah the Butcher and Bobo Brazil, and featured long, bloody brawls. The Puerto Rico territory featured Carlos Colón, The Invader and Abdullah, and introduced fire as an element of violence. The Memphis territory featured Jerry Lawler, Terry Funk, Eddie Gilbert and Bill Dundee and introduced the empty arena match and fighting among the crowd into the concession stands, improvising attacks with whatever appliances could be found. More specialties such as ladder matches, scaffold matches and Dog Collar matches were introduced. The NWA eventually instituted a World Brass Knuckles Championship, which was active in the Tennessee territory from 1978 to 1980.

=== 1990s ===
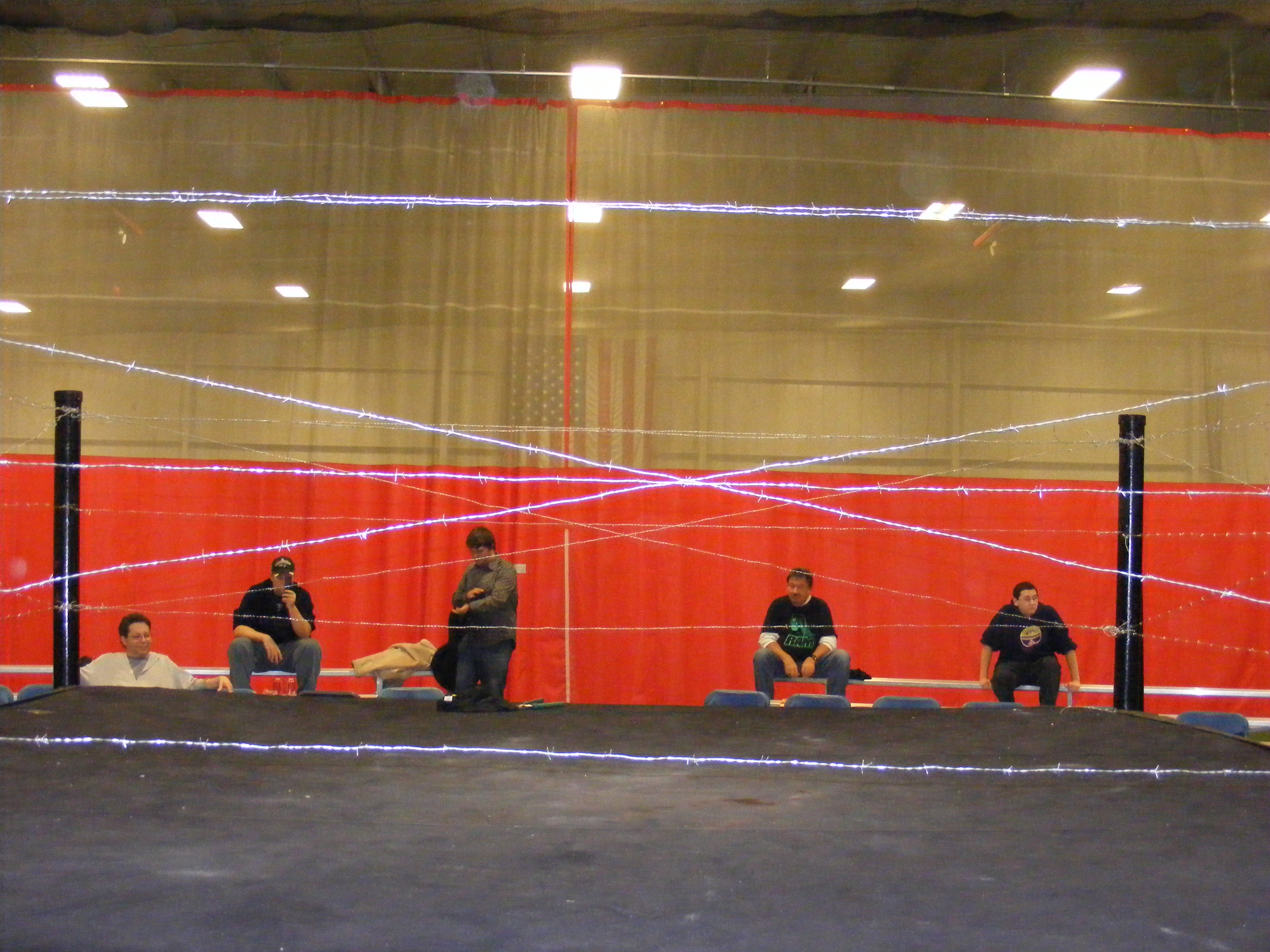
A ring using barbed wire instead of ropes; this was first popularised by FMW in the 1990s.

In 1989, Frontier Martial-Arts Wrestling (FMW) was founded in Japan, the first promotion dedicated largely to the wild brawling style. In the early 1990s, the Puerto Rican promoter Víctor Quiñones arrived in Japan, being invited to FMW as the special manager. FMW escalated the violence to legitimately dangerous new levels, with barbed wire ropes, timed C4 explosives, exploding wire ropes, and "land mines", known as "deathmatch". The federation featured many future North American stars, and became very popular worldwide.

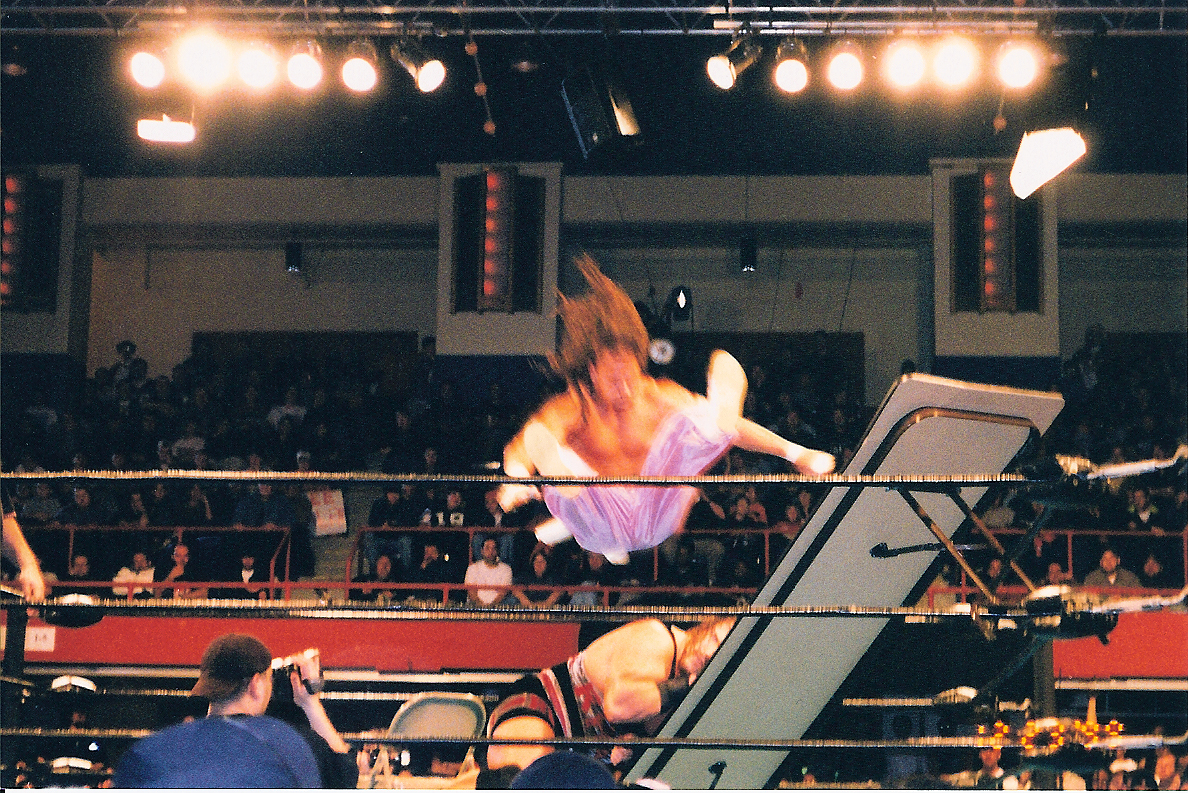
Sabu putting Rhino through a table in Extreme Championship Wrestling

Soon after, in the United States, two independent promotions had brief but significant runs, serving as prototypes for Extreme Championship Wrestling. The Philadelphia-based Tri-State Wrestling Alliance held occasional supercards that featured big name stars among their own local talent, and showcased wild bloody main event brawls with Abdullah the Butcher, The Sheik, Jesse James Sr. and others. The National Wrestling Federation (formerly known as Continental Wrestling Alliance) was based in New York state. Both TWA and NWF featured Larry Winters and D. C. Drake, who engaged in a long blood feud. The two promotions ended about the same time, and National Wrestling Alliance Eastern Championship Wrestling took their place, with many of the same wrestlers and venues. Eddie Gilbert was the initial booker, and was replaced a few months later by Paul Heyman. After splitting off from the NWA, the company changed its name to Extreme Championship Wrestling, and became the leading independent hardcore wrestling federation in North America. ECW coined the term "hardcore wrestling", but its usage there was slightly different from how it is used today. In ECW, 'hardcore' referred to a strong work ethic, high levels of effort, dedication to the fans, and lack of fluff or filler. Their level of violence rarely equaled that of the Japanese promotions.

A new gimmick, breaking wooden tables, was introduced to ECW through Sabu, nephew of The Sheik. Sabu had developed a gimmick of throwing himself through a propped-up table in Japan in order to entertain the crowd and get his character over as a wild and possibly insane man. He then started to put opponents through tables, a relatively safe spot which looked and sounded devastating. He brought it with him to ECW, where it became the focus of a feud involving multiple teams. The table spot became a staple of ECW events, and has become so commonplace that it is now incorporated into otherwise non-hardcore matches in almost every promotion.

In Japan, hardcore promotions sprang up around the country, including Wrestling International New Generations W*ING, the International Wrestling Association of Japan and Big Japan Pro Wrestling. New elements included fluorescent light tubes, scattered thumb tacks, flaming ropes and live piranhas.

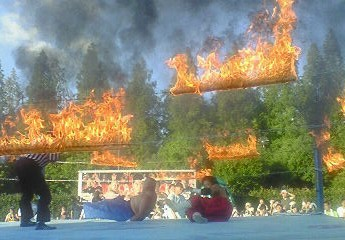
A fire deathmatch

In the mid-1990s, FMW eventually held female hardcore matches at the suggestion of Megumi Kudo. The first one was held between Megumi Kudo and Combat Toyoda as a deathmatch where the ring ropes were replaced with electrified barbed-wire with explosives. After the match, many female wrestlers had various brutal and bloody deathmatches in FMW with barbed-wire ropes, barbed-wire barricades, exploding barbed-wire barricades, electrified or exploding (or both) barbed-wire ropes, broken glass, and various combinations thereof. These matches often included various dangerous weapons such as barbed-wire wrapped chains, flaming barbed-wire baseball bats, and sickles. Most of the wrestlers who competed in these deathmatches, including some non-FMW rosters such as Shinobu Kandori, Lioness Asuka, and Mayumi Ozaki, were sent to the hospital afterwards.

ECW's popularity led to the major American promotions of the 1990s, World Championship Wrestling and World Wrestling Federation, creating divisions devoted exclusively to "hardcore" wrestling (which mostly amounted to no-disqualification weapons matches). The divisions were at first largely centered around ECW alumni such as Mick Foley, Terry Funk, Raven and Sandman. In the World Wrestling Federation/Entertainment, ladder matches, which had become more common, were now combined with tables and weapons matches to create Tables, Ladders, and Chairs matches.

=== 2000s ===
ECW influenced Independent wrestling organizations such as Xtreme Pro Wrestling, International Wrestling Syndicate, IWA Mid-South, Combat Zone Wrestling, and Juggalo Championship Wrestling, which carried on ECW's violent style after it went defunct.

Hardcore wrestling has fallen out of favor in the major American promotions; the last major hardcore title was the WWE Hardcore Championship, which merged into the Intercontinental Title in 2002. However, WWE still featured a yearly pay per view event based around hardcore wrestling called WWE Extreme Rules until 2022. In 2006, the MTV-affiliated promotion/show Wrestling Society X featured hardcore wrestling, but was cancelled after one season.

== Rules ==
The main rule behind hardcore can have various connotations. Thus, hardcore wrestling is often separated into distinct "levels" based on the graphic nature of the match:

- A 24/7 title match describes a situation where a hardcore wrestler must defend the title at all times and all places. The match (and the title) can be won by pinfall (or submission) at any time and in any place in the presence of a referee. The match has no fixed location, timeframe or even opponent (in certain cases even non-human animals or inanimate objects can become champions). This is one of the most severe forms of hardcore match given its unpredictability. This was initially a self-imposed stipulation of Crash Holly's WWE Hardcore Championship but afterward became a general rule of the title. During the time Holly defended his title, he did so in such locations as his hotel room, at the airport, in a supermarket, and even at an arcade.
- A no disqualification match, a no holds barred match, or an anything goes match tends to be less severe, with action taking place mostly inside the ring, despite most of the time there is a no countout stipulation. Usage of foreign objects is typically low and minimal, with run-ins (another form of disqualification) being frequently used. The match is often contested between valets (where they may lack wrestling skills), or between a wrestler and a valet (in which a wrestler is expected to run-in and defend their valets). Because of the low-key nature, few consider a no-disqualification match as hardcore, although there is no semantic difference.
- A street fight uses the various elements of "No Holds Barred" and "No Disqualification" and occasionally does allow pinfalls and submissions outside of the ring. The only real difference/variation is that in a street fight, wrestlers wear their street clothes instead of tights, although there have been street fights where the combatants wear their tights. Also, like an "I Quit" match, rope break does not apply, so having any part of the body against the ropes will not break a submission or pin attempt. The only way to get out of a submission is to fight off the submission attempt. But the person applying the hold can use the ropes, or even weapons, for extra leverage.
- A deathmatch tends to be bloody, brutal, and the most severe, with a heavy emphasis on the use of heavy bleeding and the usage of fluorescent light tubes, light bulbs, panes of glass, barbed wire (sometimes electrified when tied around the ring), fire, thumbtacks, razor blades, gusset plates, syringes, explosives, bed of nails, bed of barbed wire, staple guns, concrete blocks, live piranhas, cactus plants, live scorpions and other dangerous wrestling weapons, along with graphic violence, to induce extreme and heavy bleeding and will typically lead to bloodier, more brutal and more violent contests. The types and nature of foreign objects are meant be extremely graphic, brutal, dangerous, bloody and violent. In more recent years, some state athletic commissions in the United States have cracked down on the types and frequency of weapons used in these matches.
- A hardcore match, sometimes referred to as a Raven's Rules match or an Extreme Rules match, tends to be somewhere in between, and that emphasize the blood, brutality, and real violence, instead emphasis on the brutality of the attacks, moderate brawling techniques, the use of foreign objects and other obstacles of various sorts such as chairs, chains, tables, kendo sticks, fireballs, ladders, and tire irons, and the extreme physical toll on the wrestlers involved, but also often combined with brawling all over the arena or anywhere rather than traditional wrestling holds and techniques. WWE dubs the Hardcore match as an "Extreme Rules" match, and "Belfast Brawl" when the match features Finlay. While less graphic, the "rules" are the same in a hardcore match as in a deathmatch; that is, there are no rules beyond a 3-count pin for victory and/or a submission victory. Another variations of hardcore match such as "Extreme match"; the version of hardcore match that heavily featured highspots and weapon attacks, and the "HardKore X-Treme match"; the match was same as hardcore match except weapons include flaming tables, flaming chairs, flaming weapons, razor wire, glass boards, and weapons wrapped in barbed wire. CZW dubs the Hardcore matches as "Ultraviolent Rules" match, the hardcore-style matches that will involve, encourage, and emphasize the spirits of Combat Zone Wrestling, along with ladders, tables, chairs, thumbtacks, nails, barbed wire, light tubes, glass, fire, weed whacker, staple guns, as well as all other various weapons covered in anything else (barbwired steel chairs, nail bats, barbed wired bats, light tube bats, barbwired tables, flaming tables, light tube tables, barbed wired ladders, barbed wired glass sheets, light tube glass sheet, beds of barbed wire, beds of light tubes, beds of thumbtacks, etc.). JCW also dubs the hardcore match called "Juggalo Rulz" matches or JCW Deathmatch are Hardcore-style matches that will emphasize the spirits of Juggalo Championship Wrestling.
- Combat Zone Wrestling's Cage of Death, which is held yearly, implements the use of multiple weapons littered around the wrestling ring and attached to the cage walls. The usual weapons are there, as are unusual ones, such as weedwhackers.

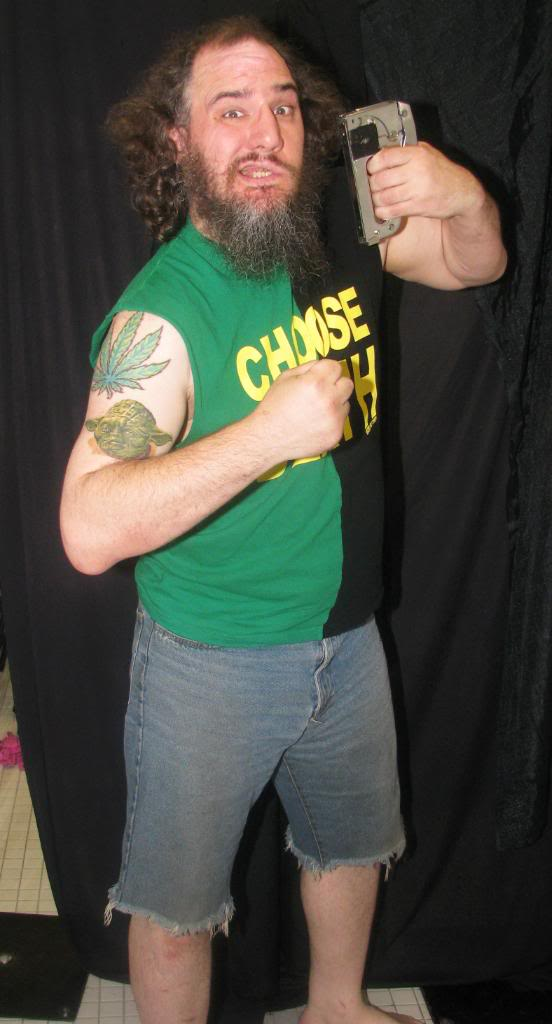
Necro Butcher poses with a staple gun

- A staple gun match may take (and has taken) many different forms. Just about any singles, triple threats, four-ways, or melee match type can be adapted to staple gun matches but the common thread in each one is that wrestlers try and staple something to their opponent. The occurrence of this event is more common on the independent wrestling circuits like the IWA Mid-South King of the Deathmatch or Hardcore wrestling circuits staple matches are commonplace. Rules vary for each tournament or wrestlers association but the underlining concept is stapling something to the body of the other wrestler. In Outcast Xtreme Wrestling (OXW) events the first person to staple seven one-dollar bills to their opponent wins. In the Combat Zone Wrestling league the number of bills is 13, they call their staple gun matches the, "Unlucky 13 Staple Gun". International Wrestling Association (IWA) has their own version called the "Unlucky Seven Staple Gun Match." The popular midget wrestling league run by Puppet the Psycho Dwarf and his merry band of Half-Pint Brawlers' main event is called the, "$21 Staple Gun Match". In this version each dwarf is armed with a stapler and as the match goes on audience members throw bills into the ring. The first person to staple 11 bills to the other wrestler body wins. When asked about the event Puppet said "Getting a dollar bill stapled to your tongue leaves a bad taste in your mouth." A staple gun match was showcased in the 2008 film The Wrestler, between main character Randy "The Ram" Robinson, and real-life hardcore wrestler Necro Butcher.

== Common weapons ==
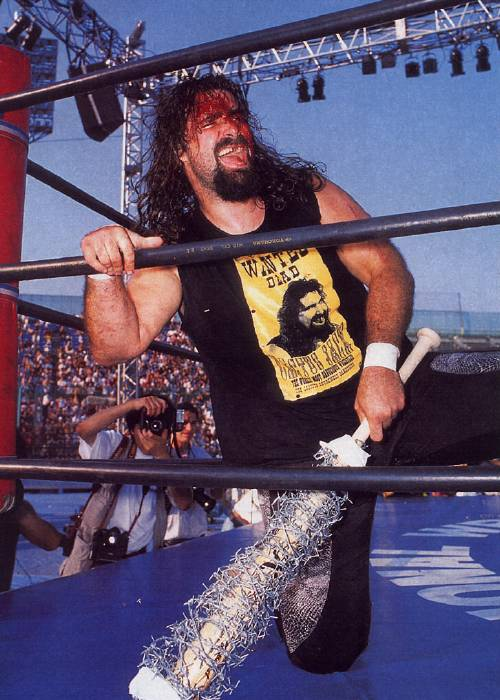
Mick Foley wielding a barbed wire baseball bat

Hardcore matches tend to emphasize the use of certain weapons, the brutality of the attacks, moderate brawling techniques, and the extreme physical toll on the wrestlers, and thus many euphemisms for these matches are employed. The almost kayfabe-breaking accessibility of some of these weapons—‌often under the ring—‌to wrestlers has led to the noun "plunder" when referencing them. Examples include "street fights" and "bunkhouse brawls", which are hardcore-style matches that specify that wrestlers need not be in typical wrestling gear when they are battling, "no holds barred" matches which emphasize the no-disqualification rule, "hardcore extreme" matches which are a version of hardcore rules match that can include flaming tables, flaming chairs, flaming weapons, razor wire, sheets of glass, and barbed wire-covered weapons, and "death matches", which include the use of fluorescent light tubes, panes of glass, barbed wire, fire, thumbtacks, razor blades, gusset plates, syringes, needles, explosives, beds of nails, staple guns, concrete blocks, live piranhas, and other objects to provoke (and capitalize on) extreme bleeding.

In the WWE, extreme rules matches are hardcore-style matches that emphasize the spirit of its former competing wrestling promotion Extreme Championship Wrestling. Combat Zone Wrestling (CZW) dubs hardcore matches "ultraviolent rules" matches, which can involve and emphasize the use of ladders, tables, chairs, thumbtacks, barbed wire, light tubes, glass boards, fire, staple guns, and that emphasize the core philosophy of "ultraviolent" hardcore wrestling, which apart from the use of unconventional weapons. emphasizes intense physical violence and extreme risk-taking. CZW's annual "Cage of Death" event is considered the embodiment of the company's spirit and features a cage-like structure surrounded by numerous various weapons.

In Juggalo Championship Wrestling (JCW), "Juggalo Rules" match, the Hardcore-style matches that emphasize the spirit of JCW. Other euphemisms, such as the Good Housekeeping match and Full Metal Mayhem, emphasize the use of certain foreign objects as being legal (the former with kitchen implements and the latter with metallic objects). In a Fans Bring the Weapons match, wrestlers fight with "weapons" that members of the audience bring to the venue (most often brought are standard kitchen household appliances, like frying pans, toasters, or rolling pins, although its not unusual that fans occasionally bring in items that are far more improbable, like an artificial leg or LEGO); this was popularized in the United States by ECW and is now a specialty in CZW. Below is a list of some common weapons.

- Folding chair variants
- Aluminum can - often also cut in half and attached to a can board weapon.
- Ladder - 2-sided metal or metal plated folding ladders are most commonly used in pro wrestling, while 1-sided wooden ladders have been used it is rare. Wooden ladders painted and plated to look like metal ladders is common in larger promotions as they can be easily reused and gimmicked whereas a normal metal ladder often ends up with dents and damage in a pro wrestling match.
- 2 inch × 4 inch profile dimensional lumber
- Folding table - Popularized by Sabu.
- Sledgehammer - popularized by Triple H as a weapon in WWE.
- Barbed wire
- Baseball bat - usually wooden, metal or plastic.
  - Barbed wire bat - popularized by Atsushi Onita in Japan and Mick Foley in the United States.
  - Electrified barbed wire bat - Barbed wire bat that is attached to an electric current. The current is disabled unless a wrestler touches the activation button usually on the ring post or in a container. When it is used on an opponent it produces a large amount of sparks. Commonly used in “Current Blast deathmatches” by Atsushi Onita.
  - Exploding barbed wire bat - a variation of the electrified barbed wire bat except rigged to pyrotechnics. When used in a match to strike an opponent it creates a loud explosion. The explosion also often also features sparks like the electrified variant and a smoke bomb effect briefly stunning everyone in the ring.
  - Thumbtack bat - Thumbtacks glued or taped onto a standard bat or a plastic child’s toy bat.
  - Lightbulb bat - Incandescent light bulbs attached to a plastic toy baseball bat.
- Boards - plywood board used on its own or often with a weapon attached by glue, tape or staple on it. Occasionally a glass plate is used as a “board” with weapons glued on.
  - Barbed wire board
  - C4 board - also known as a landmine board or explosive board. A board that explodes or sets off puro when landed on. Often but not always includes barbed wire. The C4 version was infamously used in the King of the Death Match finals between Cactus Jack and Terry Funk, resulting in second degree burns to Foley’s arm.
  - Cross board - a plywood board featuring weapons in the shape of a cross.
  - Gadget board - a board with AC power plugs on it.
  - Human slicer board - a board featuring razors, graters, fruit peelers & gusset plates. Occasionally used in Japan since 2020.
  - W board - plywood board with weapons in the shape of a W.
- Crate
- Kendo stick - also called a “Singapore cane”.
- Street sign
- Fire - used either to light a weapon on fire for greater effect or used as a direct weapon itself through fire blowing. Mr. Pogo frequently used fire blowing in his matches to light objects covered in accelerant on fire or to blow directly at his opponents. Flash paper is also used to “fireball” people. Chris Jericho used this as part of his “Wizard” gimmick in AEW, and it has been used many times throughout the years in segments and promos.
- Grater
- Nail fastener variants
  - Bed of nails
  - Thumbtack
  - Carpet tack strip
  - Rail spike - commonly used by Kevin Sullivan.
  - Gusset plate - introduced by Masada.
- Metal or plastic trash can
- Fluorescent lighttube - first popularized in Japan.
- Metal pipe
- Stapler
  - Staple gun
- Razor blades - usually attached to a handheld object or embedded into styrofoam attached to a sheet or board of plywood. The latter is a popular variation associated with Jun Kasai.
- Tray
- Glass plate
  - Annealed or untempered glass - glass that breaks into large shards. Rarely used as it can cause fatal injuries. When glass panes were first introduced into hardcore wrestling, this type was more prevalent until tempered glass was realized as a safer option, but still producing the same results for audiences. When used in pro wrestling, it’s usually via accident.
  - Tempered glass - Safer glass plates that break into small granular pieces instead of shards.
- Plastic storage container - used often by Mao and Chris Brookes in DDT Pro-Wrestling.
- Kenzan - popularized by Abdullah Kobayashi.

== Hardcore championships ==
In promotions where Hardcore wrestling is present, a Hardcore title may come into existence. This form of title is defended under hardcore rules, and title changes are frequent. Some hardcore titles may have their own unique rules. For example, the WWE Hardcore Championship was defended under 24/7 rules, meaning it could be defended and won at any time, provided a referee was present to make the pinfall. The OVW Hardcore Championship had a trashcan passed from wrestler to wrestler rather than a belt. The GHC Openweight Hardcore Championship had a unique stipulation in that if a challenger who was outweighed by the champion survived 15 minutes, he won the match and the title.

== See also ==
- Hardcore Hall of Fame
- Styles of wrestling
- Blading (professional wrestling)
- Extreme Championship Wrestling
- WWE Hardcore Championship
- Attitude Era
- Mick Foley
