= IWA Kawasaki Dream =

Professional wrestling competition

Kawasaki Dream
- Promotion: International Wrestling Association of Japan
- Date: August 20, 1995
- City: Kawasaki, Kanagawa, Japan
- Venue: Kawasaki Stadium
- Attendance: 28,757
- Tagline: King of the Deathmatch

Kawasaki Dream was a professional wrestling supercard produced by the Japanese professional wrestling promotion International Wrestling Association (IWA). The event took place on August 20, 1995, at the Kawasaki Stadium in Kawasaki, Kanagawa. The event was a huge success for the promotion drawing a crowd of 28,757 attendants, the largest crowd for an IWA Japan show and it was the most successful and biggest show of the promotion.

The key highlight of Kawasaki Dream was the 1995 King of the Deathmatch Tournament, an eight-man single elimination tournament, which featured various matches of deathmatch wrestling style. Cactus Jack won the tournament by defeating Terry Funk in the final round. The tournament was critically acclaimed and widely well received by the critics and audiences and the tournament final between Cactus Jack and Terry Funk has been considered by some wrestling journalists to be the greatest deathmatch in the history of professional wrestling.

== Event ==
=== Preliminary matches ===
In the first non-televised match, Keisuke Yamada and Keizo Matsuda defeated Yoshihiro Tajiri and Taisuke Tagami when Yamada pinned Tajiri with an inside cradle.

The second match was a joshi match, in which Kiyoko Ichiki defeated Emi Motokawa after a Tiger Driver.

In the third bout, Iceman took on Kamikaze. Near the end of the match, Kamikaze hit a German suplex and attempted a roll-up on Iceman, who reversed it for the win.

=== Championship matches ===
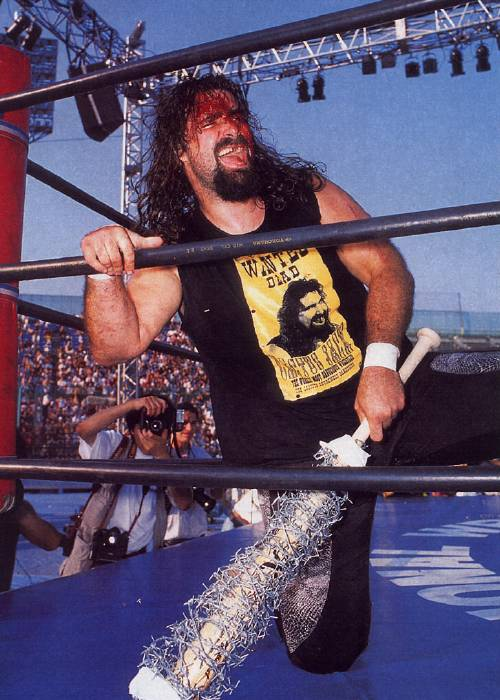
Cactus Jack won the 1995 King of the Deathmatch tournament.

Los Cowboys (El Texano and Silver King) defended the World Tag Team Championship against The Headhunters (Headhunter A and Headhunter B). Headhunters threw King into the crowd and double teamed Texano as Headhunter B nailed a superbomb to Texano to win the World Tag Team Championship.

Next, Flying Kid Ichihara defended the WWA International Light Heavyweight Championship against Takashi Okano in the first championship match of the event. Okano countered a hurricanrana attempt by Ichihara into a sunset flip to win the title.

In the penultimate match, Dan Severn defended the NWA World Heavyweight Championship against Tarzan Goto. Near the end of the match, Goto missed a clothesline on Severn, who hit a German suplex on Goto and applied a rear naked choke to make Goto pass out to the hold and thus retained his title.

=== Quarterfinals ===
The first quarter-final match of the King of the Deathmatch tournament was a Barbed Wire Board and Chain match between Tiger Jeet Singh and Mr. Gannosuke. After brawling at ringside for much of the match, the action returned to the ring where Singh applied a Cobra Claw on Gannosuke onto barbed wire for the win.

The next Barbed Wire Board and Chain match featured Terry Funk against Leatherface. Leatherface gained early control by hitting a moonsault on Funk. Near the end of the match, Funk hit Leatherface with a chained first for the win.

The third match in the tournament was a Barbed Wire Baseball Bat and Thumbtacks match between Cactus Jack and Terry Gordy. Jack was dropped numerous times on the thumbtacks until he hit a DDT to Gordy on the thumbtacks for the win.

Shoji Nakamaki faced Hiroshi Ono in the next Barbed Wire Baseball Bat and Thumbtacks match. Ono hit two belly-to-back suplexes to Nakamaki on the thumbtacks until Nakamaki countered a third suplex attempt with a powerbomb and then followed with a full nelson facebuster to Ono on the thumbtacks to advance to the semi-final.

=== Semifinals ===
The first semi-final match was a Barbed Wire Board and Glass match pitting Terry Funk against Tiger Jeet Singh. Near the end of the match, Singh raked the eyes of Funk to avoid a spinning toe hold by Funk and spiked his eyes and then Cactus Jack interfered in the match on Singh's behalf as he tried to hit Funk with a saber but Funk avoided it and Jack accidentally knocked out Singh with the saber, allowing Funk to pin him for the win.

The next semi-final was a Barbed Wire Board and Spike Nail match between Shoji Nakamaki and Cactus Jack. After a back and forth match, Jack hit a double-arm DDT to Nakamaki into the barbed wire board to advance to the final.

=== Final ===
The final round of the tournament was a Barbed Wire Rope, Exploding Barbed Wire Boards and Exploding Ring Time Bomb Deathmatch between Terry Funk and Cactus Jack. Tiger Jeet Singh interfered in the match on Jack's behalf by hitting Funk with a sabre and then the two whipped him into the barbed wire which allowed Jack to gain momentum over Funk. Near the end of the match, Jack hit a diving elbow drop to Funk from the top of a ladder to gain a near-fall and then climbed the ladder to hit a second diving elbow drop but Funk knocked him out and Jack fell into the barbed wire ropes. Funk then collapsed himself into the barbed wire ropes. Jack got up first, crawling to Funk and pinning him. As a result, Jack won the match and won the 1995 King of the Deathmatch Tournament.

== Results ==
No.	Results	Stipulations	Times
1^{D}	Keisuke Yamada and Keizo Matsuda defeated Yoshihiro Tajiri and Taisuke Tagami	Tag team match	11:44
2^{D}	Kiyoko Ichiki defeated Emi Motokawa	Singles match	10:24
3	Tiger Jeet Singh defeated Mr. Gannosuke	Barbed Wire Board and Chain match IWA King of the Deathmatch tournament quarter-final match	7:11
4	Terry Funk defeated Leatherface	Barbed Wire Board and Chain match IWA King of the Deathmatch tournament quarter-final match	8:54
5	Cactus Jack defeated Terry Gordy	Barbed Wire Baseball Bat and Thumbtacks match IWA King of the Deathmatch tournament quarter-final match	6:58
6	Shoji Nakamaki defeated Hiroshi Ono	Barbed Wire Baseball Bat and Thumbtacks match IWA King of the Deathmatch tournament quarter-final match	7:19
7	Takashi Okano defeated Flying Kid Ichihara (c)	Singles match for the WWA International Light Heavyweight Championship	17:01
8	Iceman defeated Kamikaze	Singles match	9:45
9	Terry Funk defeated Tiger Jeet Singh	Barbed Wire Board and Glass match IWA King of the Deathmatch tournament semi-final match	6:04
10	Cactus Jack defeated Shoji Nakamaki	Barbed Wire Board and Spike Nail match IWA King of the Deathmatch tournament semi-final match	9:49
11	The Headhunters (Headhunter A and Headhunter B) defeated Los Cowboys (El Texano and Silver King) (c)	Tag team match for the IWA World Tag Team Championship	17:59
12	Dan Severn (c) defeated Tarzan Goto via technical knockout	Singles match for the NWA World Heavyweight Championship	11:35
13	Cactus Jack defeated Terry Funk	Barbed Wire Rope, Exploding Barbed Wire Boards and Exploding Ring Time Bomb Deathmatch; IWA King of the Deathmatch tournament final match	13:21
(c) / – the champion(s) heading into the match; D / – this was a dark match

=== Tournament brackets ===
Quarterfinals
Mr. Gannosuke	Pin
Tiger Jeet Singh	7:11
Terry Funk	Pin
Leatherface	8:54
Cactus Jack	Pin
Terry Gordy	6:58
Hiroshi Ono	Pin
Shoji Nakamaki	7:19

Semifinals
Tiger Jeet Singh	Pin
Terry Funk	6:04
Cactus Jack	Pin
Shoji Nakamaki	9:49

Final
Terry Funk	Pin
Cactus Jack	13:21
