= Saint Andrew's Hall (Detroit) =

Concert venue

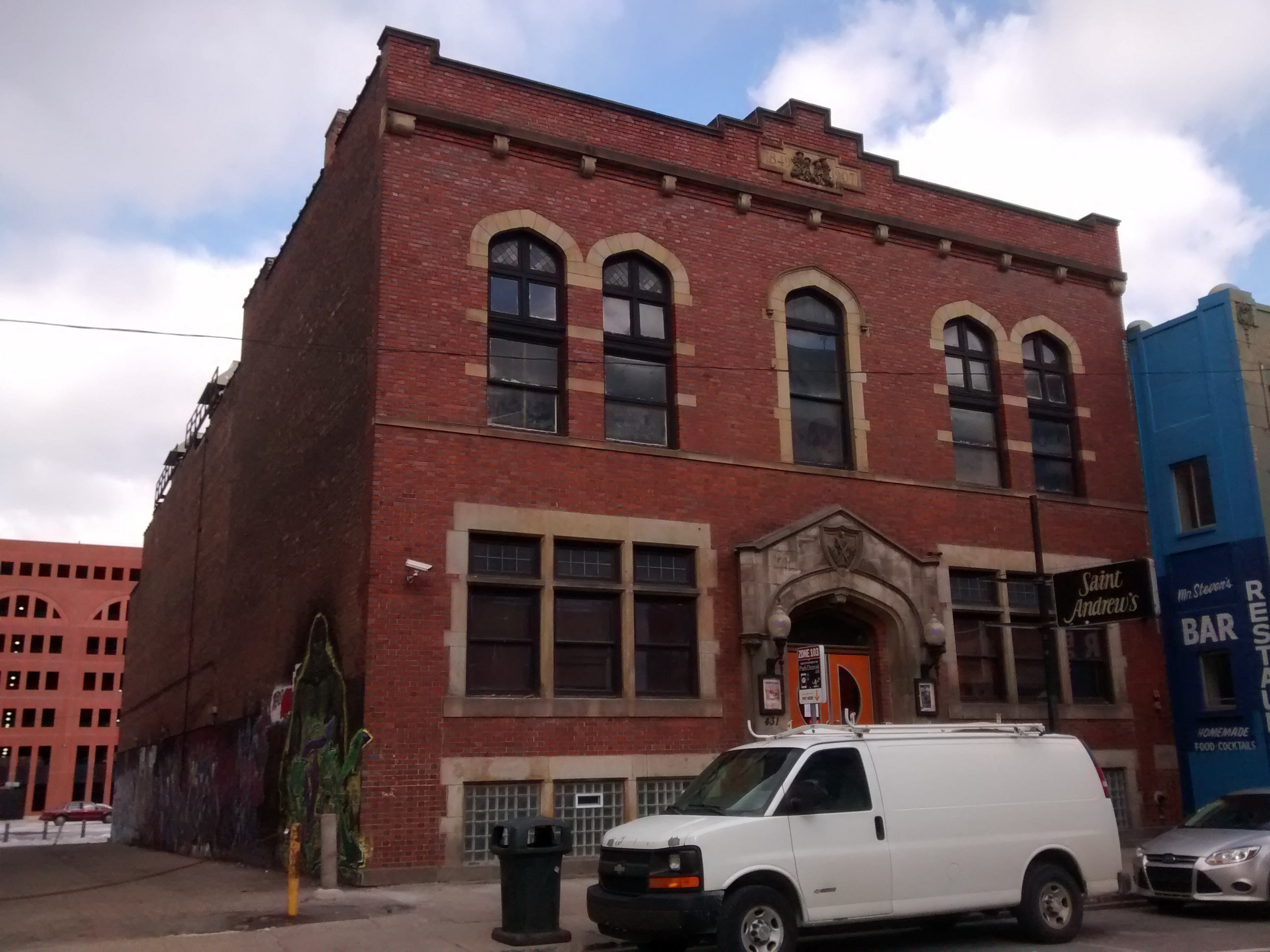
- Exterior view of venue (2016)
- Interactive map of Saint Andrew's Hall
- Address: 431 E Congress St; Detroit, MI 48226-2912
- Location: Bricktown Historic District
- Coordinates: 42.33234°N 83.04155°W
- Owner: Saint Andrew's Society of Detroit
- Operator: Live Nation
- Capacity: 1,000

Construction
- Groundbreaking: August 3, 1907
- Opened: January 18, 1908
- Cost: $50,000 ($1.73 million in 2025 dollars)

Website
- Venue Website

Saint Andrew's Hall is a concert venue located in Detroit, Michigan, which was formerly the meeting place for the Saint Andrew's Society of Detroit. The Shelter lies underneath St. Andrews Hall and hosts various live music acts and DJs. It is known for being one of the first stages on which Eminem performed.

== History ==
Since 1980, the venue has been bringing trendsetting music to Detroit. The hall has hosted famous breakthrough acts during the '80s and '90s, such as the Insane Clown Posse, Iggy Pop, The Verve, Tool, Skinny Puppy, Nirvana, R.E.M., No Doubt, Icehouse, James, The Cranberries, and the Red Hot Chili Peppers .

Bootleg Detroit, a fan recording of Morphine's first appearance at St. Andrew's Hall on March 7, 1994, was officially released by the band following the death of frontman Mark Sandman.

Electric Six, a band originally from Detroit, filmed a full concert at St. Andrew's Hall on September 7, 2013, and released it as a feature-length live DVD entitled Absolute Treasure.

== Noted performers ==
- The Adicts
- AJR
- The Alarm
- The Mission (band)
- Bauhaus
- Black Flag
- Blind Melon
- The Dandy Warhols
- Iggy Pop
- New Order
- Nina Hagen
- Dead Kennedys
- The Lords of the New Church
- Psychedelic Furs
- Echo & the Bunnymen
- The Cramps
- Rank and File
- R.E.M.
- Rhythm Corps
- The Verve
- Love and Rockets
- Majesty Crush
- The Bangles
- The Beastie Boys
- Bad Manners
- Sun Ra
- Nirvana
- Pearl Jam
- Foo Fighters
- Red Hot Chili Peppers
- Radiohead
- Nick Cave and the Bad Seeds
- Figures on a Beach
- Fishbone
- Seether
- Jane's Addiction
- The Damned
- The Pogues
- Camper Van Beethoven
- Delta Spirit
- The Weeknd
- Collective Soul
- Sleigh Bells
- The Suicide Machines
- The Reverend Horton Heat
- The Strokes
- Less Than Jake
- Voodoo Glow Skulls
- Minus The Bear
- Insane Clown Posse
- Engines of Aggression
- Hüsker Dü
- Halsey
- Jason & the Scorchers
- Juggalo Championship Wrestling
- The Hard Lessons
- Chris Whitley
- Garbage
- Goober & The Peas
- Bad Brains
- Monster Magnet
- Blues Traveler
- The Lemonheads
- Rage Against the Machine
- Throwing Muses
- Slum Village
- The Showdown
- Joe Strummer & the Mescaleros
- Manchester Orchestra
- The Replacements
- Soul Asylum
- Local H
- Skinny Puppy
- Frank Turner & The Sleeping Souls
- The Mowgli's
- The Jesus Lizard
- Kacey Musgraves
- The Mighty Mighty Bosstones
- Enrique Bunbury
- Smashing Pumpkins
- Tool
- Jake Miller
- The Butthole Surfers
- Jessica Hernandez & the Deltas
- Alien Sex Fiend
- Dead Milkmen
- Wayne Kramer
- Dread Zeppelin
- Fear
- GBH
- The Story So Far
- Eric Roberson
- Sonic Youth
- Gwar
- Matthew Sweet
- This or the Apocalypse
- No Doubt
- Big Chief
- The Offspring
- Cody Simpson
- The Blasters
- Ubiquitous Synergy Seeker
- The Jesus and Mary Chain
- Pop Will Eat Itself
- Front 242
- New Politics
- G. Love & Special Sauce
- Cracker
- Karmin
- Buffalo Tom
- Stone Temple Pilots
- Lights
- Morphine
- X
- Lily Allen
- The Cranberries
- My Chemical Romance
- Adele
- Corey Smith
- Awolnation
- Alice in Chains
- Dinosaur Jr.
- GG Allen
- Hoobastank
- James
- London Grammar
- Blur
- Danger Productions
- Toad the Wet Sprocket
- Queens of the Stone Age
- House of Love
- Soundgarden
- New Found Glory
- Bob Dylan
- Cage The Elephant
- Social Distortion
- Real Friends
- Shane MacGowan & The Popes
- The Early November
- Megadeth
- Doll Skin
- Nine Inch Nails
- Paramore
- John Legend
- Matt Nathanson
- MellowHigh
- Screaming Trees
- Red Fang
- Mother Love Bone
- Silverstein
- Primal Scream
- Meek Mill
- The Jayhawks
- Witch Mountain
- Steve Earle
- Eminem
- Twiztid
- Fun (band)
- Built To Spill
- Taking Back Sunday
- TV On The Radio
- Walk the Moon
- Old 97's
- Twenty One Pilots
- Helmet
- Meat Puppets
- Motion City Soundtrack
- My Morning Jacket
- Mike Watt
- Bazzi (singer)
- Bleachers (band)
- Jimmy Eat World
- The Black Crowes
- blink-182
- The Gutter Twins
- Fall Out Boy
- Imagine Dragons
- Madison Beer
- Electric Six
- The Devil Makes Three
- Phish
- Stevie Ray Vaughan
- My Bloody Valentine
- Ride
- Slowdive
- D12
- Drive-By Truckers
- The Busboys
- Moby
- The Orb
- Clutch
- The Jon Spencer Blues Explosion
- Zebrahead
- The Detroit Cobras
- Whitey Morgan and the 78's
- The Go-Betweens
- fIREHOSE
- Belly
- Breeders
- PJ Harvey
- Laughing Hyenas
- Gary Clark Jr.
- Wiz Khalifa
- Band-Maid
- The Warning
- The Hives
- Jack White
- Suicidal Tendencies
- Pegboy
- Buckethead
- Toadies
- Oasis
