= Hallowicked 2026 =

2026 American concert and professional wrestling event

- Promotional poster
- Date: October 31, 2026
- Venue: Detroit Masonic Temple
- Locations: Detroit, Michigan, United States
- Previous event: 2025
- Organizer: Psychopathic Records

Hallowicked
- Promotion: Juggalo Championship Wrestling
- Date: October 31, 2026 (aired November 12, 2026)
- City: Detroit, Michigan
- Venue: Detroit Masonic Temple

Juggalo Championship Wrestling event chronology
← Previous; Shocktober Slam	Next → Skanksgiving

Hallowicked chronology
← Previous; 2025	Next → —

The 2026 edition of Hallowicked was a special concert organized by Psychopathic Records, a record label owned by the horrorcore hip-hop duo, the Insane Clown Posse. The event took place on October 31, 2026 at the Detroit Masonic Temple in Detroit, Michigan, and featured performances from the Insane Clown Posse themselves, Ganksta N-I-P, Klokwerk E, and Diggy Graves. The event also featured professional wrestling matches from Juggalo Championship Wrestling (JCW) which are scheduled to air on tape delay on a later date as an episode of JCW Lunacy on YouTube.

== Production ==
Other on-screen personnel
Role:	Name:
Disc jockey	DJ Clay
Commentators	Joe Dombrowski
Commentators	Veda Scott
Ring announcer	Mark Roberts

=== Background ===
Hallowicked was founded in 1994 originally to generate attention to the ICP's music after radio station WDVD stopped playing their music on the station. The inaugural concert which took place at the Majestic Theatre in Detroit, Michigan, featured the ICP themselves headlining the concert with Project Born and J.P. The Unknown being the opening acts. To commemorate the concert, 100 cassettes for a single titled "Dead Pumpkins" were handed to attendees. In 1996 during a concert in Toledo, Ohio, Violent J, had suffered a fractured collar bone after moonsaulting off the stage. The show was part of a tour which would've concluded in Detroit, however, the remainder of the tour was cancelled due to the injury.

At the 2010 concert, ICP announced the first album in the second set of Joker's Card albums titled The Mighty Death Pop! which was later released on August 12, 2012 during the Gathering of the Juggalos.

On October 18, 2012, safety concerns from the Royal Oak Police Department had forced the concert which was originally being scheduled to be held at the Royal Oak Music Theatre to be moved to the Fillmore in Detroit, Michigan citing among multiple reasons, the labeling of juggalos as a gang by the Federal Bureau of Investigation.

From October 23, 2024 to October 29, 2024, Insane Clown Posse organized the Train of Terror Tour which built to their annual Hallowicked concert in Detroit, Michigan and featured Ouija Macc, Shaggy The Airhead, Wakko The Kidd, Monster Wolf along with live episodes of JCW Lunacy on each night of the tour.

On October 31, 2025, JCW taped a special episode of JCW Lunacy which featured Matt Cardona as the Carnival of Carnage defeating 2 Tuff Tony to win the JCW Heavyweight Championship. One day after the episode aired on January 1, 2026, it was announced that Cardona had signed a contract with WWE and made his return on Friday Night SmackDown on January 2, 2026 and would vacate all of the championships he had held before signing including the JCW Heavyweight Championship.

On May 6, 2026, Psychopathic Records announced that Hallowicked 2026 would take place at the Detroit Masonic Temple on October 31, 2026. On October 7, 2026, Psychopathic Records announced that the Insane Clown Posse would be holding their first concert in Saginaw, Michigan at The Vault two days before Hallowicked. On October 10, 2026, Insane Clown Posse added a second concert on Devil's Night in Saginaw due to the October 29, 2026 concert selling out.

=== Storylines ===
JCW's Hallowicked events featured professional wrestling matches that involves different wrestlers from pre-existing scripted feuds and storylines. Wrestlers portrayed villains, heroes, or less distinguishable characters in scripted events that built tension and culminated in a wrestling match or series of matches. Storylines were produced on Juggalo Championship Wrestling's various events and their weekly streaming program JCW Lunacy

== Matches ==
No.	Results	Stipulations
1	Krule defeated Painful Paul by pinfall	Singles match
2	Luciano Family (Vincenzo and Sally Boy) (with Big Vito) defeated Choppa City (Atiba and Bruce Wayans) (c), Juggalo World Order (2 Tuff Tony and Willie Mike), and The Boneheads (Rah and Ugh) (with Barnabas the Bizarre)	Four-way tag team elimination match for the JCW World Tag Team Championship; Mad Man Pondo served as the special guest referee.
3	Josh Bishop (with Joel Gertner) (c) defeated Mr. Happy and Dijak by pinfall	Three-way match for the JCW "Linear" World Heavyweight Championship
4	Alice Crowley defeated HoKane by pinfall	Anything goes weapons match Mad Man Pondo served as the special guest referee.
5	Nic Nemeth defeated Caleb Konley (c) by pinfall	Singles match for the JCW World Heavyweight Championship
(c) / – the champion(s) heading into the match

== Performers ==
- Insane Clown Posse
- Ouija Macc
- Ganksta N-I-P
- Klokwerk E
- Diggy Graves
