= Hallowicked (concert) =

Annual concert

- Genre: Hip hop; rock; heavy metal; funk
- Venue: Majestic Theatre (1994, 2008, 2013, 2021); Royal Oak Music Theater (1995, 2002); St. Andrews Hall (2000, 2007, 2014, 2015); Roseville Palladium (1997); American Theater (1998); Michigan State Fairgrounds Coliseum (2001); State Theatre/The Fillmore Detroit (2003–2015); Russell Industrial Center (2017–2019); Harpos Concert Theatre (2022); Detroit Masonic Temple (1999, 2023–prssent)
- Locations: Detroit, Michigan (1994–1995, 1999–2001, 2003–present); Toledo, Ohio (1997); Roseville, Michigan (1997); St. Louis, Missouri (1998); Royal Oak, Michigan (1996, 2002)
- Years active: 1994–present
- Founders: Psychopathic Records, Insane Clown Posse

Hallowicked is an annual concert hosted by Insane Clown Posse's Psychopathic Records.

== History ==
The concert was founded in 1994 originally to generate attention to the ICP's music after radio station WDVD stopped playing their music on the station. The inaugural concert which took place at the Majestic Theatre in Detroit, Michigan, featured the ICP themselves headlining the concert with Project Born and J.P. The Unknown being the opening acts. To commemorate the concert, 100 cassettes for a single titled "Dead Pumpkins" were handed to attendees.

In 1995, the rapper Mystikal opened for the ICP.

In 1996 during a concert in Toledo, Ohio, Violent J, had suffered a fractured collar bone after moonsaulting off the stage. The show was part of a tour which would've concluded in Detroit, however, the remainder of the tour was cancelled due to the injury.

In 2007, during the Hallowicked After Party, a special Juggalo Championship Wrestling SlamTV! episode was taped.

At the 2010 concert, ICP announced the first album in the second set of Joker's Card albums titled The Mighty Death Pop!

On October 18, 2012, safety concerns from the Royal Oak Police Department had forced the concert which was originally being scheduled to be held at the Royal Oak Music Theatre to be moved to the Fillmore in Detroit, Michigan citing among multiple reasons, the labeling of juggalos as a gang by the Federal Bureau of Investigation.

From October 23, 2024 to October 29, 2024, Insane Clown Posse organized the Train of Terror Tour which built to their annual Hallowicked concert in Detroit, Michigan and featured Ouija Macc, Shaggy The Airhead, Wakko The Kidd, Monster Wolf along with live episodes of JCW Lunacy on each night of the tour.

== Events ==
Year	Date(s)	Venue	Location	Performers	Notes	Ref
1994	October 29	Majestic Theatre	Detroit, Michigan	Insane Clown Posse, Project Born, J.P. The Unknown		
1995	October 30-31	Royal Oak Music Theater	Royal Oak, Michigan	Insane Clown Posse, Mystikal		
1995	October 30-31	Royal Oak Music Theater	Royal Oak, Michigan	Insane Clown Posse, Mystikal		
1996	Cancelled					
1997	October 30-31	Toledo Sports Arena	Toledo, Ohio	Insane Clown Posse, House of Krazees		
1997	October 30-31	Roseville Palladium	Roseville, Michigan	Insane Clown Posse, House of Krazees		
1998	October 31	American Theater	St. Louis, Missouri	Gwar, Myzery, Twiztid, Insane Clown Posse		
1999	October 29-31	Detroit Masonic Temple	Detroit, Michigan	Twiztid, The Pimps, Insane Clown Posse		
1999	October 29-31	Detroit Masonic Temple	Detroit, Michigan	Twiztid, The Pimps, Insane Clown Posse		
1999	October 29-31	Detroit Masonic Temple	Detroit, Michigan	Twiztid, The Pimps, Insane Clown Posse		
2000	October 30-31	St. Andrews Hall	Detroit, Michigan	Psychopathic Rydas, Blaze Ya Dead Homie, Anybody Killa, Insane Clown Posse		
2000	October 30-31	St. Andrews Hall	Detroit, Michigan	Psychopathic Rydas, Blaze Ya Dead Homie, Anybody Killa, Insane Clown Posse		
2001	October 31	Michigan State Fairgrounds Coliseum	Detroit, Michigan	Dark Lotus, Blaze Ya Dead Homie, Anybody Killa, Insane Clown Posse		
2002	October 30-31	Royal Oak Music Theater	Royal Oak, Michigan	Blaze Ya Dead Homie, Esham, Zug Izland, Wolf and the Ninjas in Action, Insane Clown Posse		
2002	October 30-31	Royal Oak Music Theater	Royal Oak, Michigan	Anybody Killa, Twiztid, Insane Clown Posse		
2003	October 31	State Theatre	Detroit, Michigan	Bone Thugs N Harmony, Kottonmouth Kings, Tech N9ne, Insane Clown Posse		
2004	October 31	State Theatre	Detroit, Michigan	Mack 10, Esham, Anybody Killa, Filthee Immigrants, Insane Clown Posse		
2005	October 31	State Theatre	Detroit, Michigan	Axe Murder Boyz, Vanilla Ice, Project Deadman, Anybody Killa, Blue Monkey Sideshow, Insane Clown Posse		
2006	October 31	State Theatre	Detroit, Michigan	Boondox, Wolfpac, Subnoize Souljaz, Twiztid, Tech N9ne, Insane Clown Posse		
2007	October 31	The Fillmore Detroit	Detroit, Michigan	Boondox, Motown Rage, Necro, Insane Clown Posse		
2007	October 31	St. Andrews Hall	Detroit, Michigan	Juggalo Championship Wrestling	After party	
2008	October 31	The Fillmore Detroit	Detroit, Michigan	Blaze Ya Dead Homie, Anybody Killa, F-Dux, Motown Rage, Bailz, Awesome Dre, Marz, Twiztid, J-Reno, Axe Murder Boyz, Insane Clown Posse		
2008	October 31	Majestic Theatre	Detroit, Michigan	Juggalo Championship Wrestling	After party	
2009	October 31	The Fillmore Detroit	Detroit, Michigan	Hed PE, Motown Rage, The Dayton Family, Insane Clown Posse		
2010	October 31	The Fillmore Detroit	Detroit, Michigan	Dayton Family, Mike E. Clark, Anybody Killa, Insane Clown Posse		
2011	October 31	The Fillmore Detroit	Detroit, Michigan	Blaze Ya Dead Homie, Twiztid, Insane Clown Posse		
2012	October 31	Fillmore Detroit	Detroit, Michigan	Zug Izland, Insane Clown Posse	Originally set to be held at the Royal Oak Music Theatre in Royal Oak, Michigan.	
2013	October 31	The Fillmore Detroit	Detroit, Michigan	Jumpsteady, Big Hoodoo, Boondox, Anybody Killa, Insane Clown Posse		
2013	October 31	Majestic Theatre	Detroit, Michigan	Axe Murder Boyz, Buckwheat Groats, Juggalo Championship Wrestling	After party	
2014	October 31	The Fillmore Detroit	Detroit, Michigan	Mushroomhead, Jelly Roll, Three 6 Mafia, Madchild, Insane Clown Posse		
2014	October 31	St. Andrews Hall	Detroit, Michigan	Boondox, Axe Murder Boyz, Anybody Killa	After party	
2015	October 31	The Fillmore Detroit	Detroit, Michigan	Onyx, King810, DJ Paul, P.O.D., Insane Clown Posse		
2015	October 31	St. Andrews Hall	Detroit, Michigan	Anybody Killa, DJ Paul, Dope D.O.D., Juggalo Championship Wrestling	After party	
2016	October 31	Harpos Concert Theatre	Detroit, Michigan	Kissing Candice, Big Hoodoo, Blahzay Rose, Young Lyte, Waka Flocka Flame, Jelly Roll, Insane Clown Posse		
2017	October 31	Russell Industrial Center	Detroit, Michigan	Project Born, Ouija, The Spanish Side, Young Lyte, Juggalo Championship Wrestling, Zug Izland, Anybody Killa, Myzery, Motown Rage, Esham, Vanilla Ice, Insane Clown Posse		
2018	October 31	Russell Industrial Center	Detroit, Michigan	Ouija Macc, Juggalo Championship Wrestling, Cage, Esham, Stitches, Mac Lethal, Insane Clown Posse		
2019	October 31	Russell Industrial Center	Detroit, Michigan	Ouija Macc, Big Hoodoo, The Convalescence, Odd Squad Family, Juggalo Championship Wrestling, Green Jelly, Esham, Insane Clown Posse		
2020	October 31	N/A	Milford, Michigan	Ouija Macc, Big Hoodoo, Clownvis, Insane Clown Posse	This was an acoustic show	
2021	October 31	Majestic Theatre	Detroit, Michigan	Roadside Ghost, Terre Diaz, Ouija Macc, Dana Dentata, Insane Clown Posse		
2022	October 31	Harpos Concert Theatre	Detroit, Michigan	Ouija Macc, World's Most Dangerous Stunt Show, Juggalo Championship Wrestling, Fat Nick, Ho99o9, Mike E. Clark, Insane Clown Posse		
2023	October 31	Detroit Masonic Temple	Detroit, Michigan	Ouija Macc, Lardi B, Darby 'O Trill, Juggalo Championship Wrestling. Mike E. Clark, Merkules, Esham, Insane Clown Posse		
2024	October 31	Detroit Masonic Temple	Detroit, Michigan	Ouija Macc, Shaggy The Airhead, Wakko The Kidd, Monster Wolf, Juggalo Championship Wrestling, Insane Clown Posse		
2025	October 31	Detroit Masonic Temple	Detroit, Michigan	Ouija Macc, Alla Xul Elu, Juggalo Championship Wrestling, Trick-Trick, King Gordy, Insane Clown Posse		
2026	October 31	Detroit Masonic Temple	Detroit, Michigan	Ouija Macc, Klokwerk E, Juggalo Championship Wrestling, Diggy Graves, Ganksta N-I-P, Insane Clown Posse		
