= Hallowicked 2024 =

2024 American concert and professional wrestling event

- Promotional poster
- Date: October 31, 2024
- Venue: Detroit Masonic Temple
- Locations: Detroit, Michigan, United States
- Previous event: 2023
- Next event: 2025
- Organizer: Psychopathic Records

Hallowicked
- Promotion: Juggalo Championship Wrestling
- Date: October 31, 2024
- City: Detroit, Michigan
- Venue: Detroit Masonic Temple

Juggalo Championship Wrestling event chronology
← Previous; Devil's Night	Next → Spanks Givin'

Hallowicked chronology
← Previous; 2023	Next → 2025

The 2024 edition of Hallowicked was a special concert organized by Psychopathic Records, a record label owned by the horrorcore hip-hop duo, the Insane Clown Posse. The event took place on October 31, 2024 at the Detroit Masonic Temple in Detroit, Michigan and featured performances from the Insane Clown Posse themselves, Monster Wolf, Shaggy The Airhead, Ouija Macc, and Wakko The Kidd. The event also featured professional wrestling matches from Juggalo Championship Wrestling which was aired as a live episode of JCW Lunacy on YouTube, Facebook and Twitch.

== Background ==
Hallowicked was founded in 1994 originally to generate attention to the ICP's music after radio station WDVD stopped playing their music on the station. The inaugural concert which took place at the Majestic Theatre in Detroit, Michigan, featured the ICP themselves headlining the concert with Project Born and J.P. The Unknown being the opening acts. To commemorate the concert, 100 cassettes for a single titled "Dead Pumpkins" were handed to attendees. In 1996 during a concert in Toledo, Ohio, Violent J, had suffered a fractured collar bone after moonsaulting off the stage. The show was part of a tour which would've concluded in Detroit, however, the remainder of the tour was cancelled due to the injury.

At the 2010 concert, ICP announced the first album in the second set of Joker's Card albums titled The Mighty Death Pop! which was later released on August 12, 2012 during the Gathering of the Juggalos.

On October 18, 2012, safety concerns from the Royal Oak Police Department had forced the concert which was originally being scheduled to be held at the Royal Oak Music Theatre to be moved to the Fillmore in Detroit, Michigan citing among multiple reasons, the labeling of juggalos as a gang by the Federal Bureau of Investigation.

In August 2024, Insane Clown Posse announced that they would be going on an eight-day tour titled the Train of Terror Tour which would build up to their annual Hallowicked concert in Detroit, Michigan.

== Performers ==
- Insane Clown Posse
- Ouija Macc
- Shaggy The Airhead
- Wakko The Kidd
- Monster Wolf

== Professional wrestling production ==
=== Background ===
On March 17, 2024, JCW announced the first tapings for their new show titled JCW Lunacy would take place on May 3, 2024 at the Newport Music Hall in Columbus, Ohio. Titled The Juggalos Strike Back, the show would feature various talent from the independent circuit, JCW's regular roster, All Elite Wrestling (AEW) talent, and talent from the National Wrestling Alliance (NWA). In addition to the premiere taping, JCW announced on May 20, 2024 that they would hold an additional taping at the Harpos Concert Theatre in Detroit, Michigan and would feature Matt Cardona and the debut of the Nu Backseat Boyz consisting of Tommy Grayson and JP Grayson with their manager Johnny Kashmere. On June 10, 2024, Juggalo Championship Wrestling announced that they would launch JCW Lunacy as a bi-weekly show and would feature talent from the National Wrestling Alliance (NWA), Major League Wrestling (MLW), Total Nonstop Action Wrestling (TNA), All Elite Wrestling (AEW), Lucha Libre AAA Worldwide (AAA), Big Japan Pro Wrestling (BJW), and the independent circuit alongside JCW's regular talent. However, the show's format would abruptly switch to a weekly format beginning on September 4, 2024.

In August 2024, Insane Clown Posse announced that they would be going on an eight-day tour titled the Train of Terror Tour which would build up to their annual Hallowicked concert in Detroit, Michigan.

On September 16, 2024, JCW announced their first pay-per-view event since 2024 titled the Devil's Night Creature Double Feature which took place at the Majestic Theatre in Detroit, Michigan and featured the Insane Clown Posse as the "Bitchin' Wild Bucks". On September 18, 2024, JCW announced that they would be part of a Train of Terror Tour which would consist of the Insane Clown Posse themselves, Wakko The Kidd, Monster Wolf, Ouija Macc, and Shaggy The Airhead and would lead up to the Insane Clown Posse's annual Halloween night event, Hallowicked at the Detroit Masonic Temple in Detroit, Michigan. On the October 16, 2024 episode of JCW Lunacy, the promotion would showcase two matches from the 2024 Gathering of the Juggalos at Legend Valley in Thornville, Ohio. The first one being a battle royal with the winner being crowned the inaugural JCW American Championship which Caleb Konley had won and the main event of Bloodymania 17 which consisted of Willie Mack defending the JCW Heavyweight Championship against Matt Cross. The first night of the Train of Terror Tour which was streamed live on October 23, 2024 would see the debut of Pink Kane, a Kane parody played by Quinn Whittock who would later swap to Yellow Kane. On the final night of the Train of Terror Tour in Joliet, Illinois, the Backseat Boyz (Tommy Grayson and JP Grayson lost the JCW Tag Team Championship to Bang And Matthews (August Matthews and Davey Bang).

=== Storylines ===
JCW's Hallowicked events featured professional wrestling matches that involves different wrestlers from pre-existing scripted feuds and storylines. Wrestlers portrayed villains, heroes, or less distinguishable characters in scripted events that built tension and culminated in a wrestling match or series of matches. Storylines were produced on Juggalo Championship Wrestling's various events and their weekly streaming program JCW Lunacy.

=== Results ===
Other on-screen personnel
Role:	Name:
Commentators	Joe Dombrowski
Commentators	Manny Fresh
Commentators	Zac Amico
Ring announcer	The Ringmaster

No.	Results	Stipulations	Times
1	The Neon Blondes (Dani Mo and Facade) defeated Breyer Wellington and Jeeves by pinfall	Tag team match	5:31
2	Luigi Primo defeated Joey Janela by pinfall	Singles match	5:01
3	Caleb Konley (c) defeated Alex Taylor, Simon Gotch, and Tarzan Duran by pinfall	Four-way match for the JCW American Championship	4:58
4	Mickie Knuckles defeated Mikey Knuckles by pinfall	Singles match	4:24
5	Kerry Morton defeated CoKane and Kongo Kong by pinfall	Three-way match	2:14
6	Babathunder and The Backseat Boyz (JP Grayson and Tommy Grayson) defeated Painful Paul and The Young Altar Boys (August Matthews and Davey Bang) by pinfall	Six-man tag team match	4:53
7	James Storm vs. Silas Mason ended in a no contest	Singles match	4:49
8	Matt Cross and Willie Mack defeated Mecha Wolf and Jesus Rodriguez	Tag team match	5:34
(c) / – the champion(s) heading into the match
