= Hallowicked 2023 =

2023 American concert and professional wrestling event

- Promotional poster
- Date: October 31, 2023
- Venue: Detroit Masonic Temple
- Locations: Detroit, Michigan, United States
- Previous event: 2022
- Next event: 2024
- Organizer: Psychopathic Records

Hallowicked
- Promotion: Juggalo Championship Wrestling
- Date: October 31, 2023
- City: Detroit, Michigan
- Venue: Detroit Masonic Temple

Juggalo Championship Wrestling event chronology
← Previous; Bloodymania 16	Next → Juggalo Weekend

Hallowicked chronology
← Previous; 2022	Next → 2024

The 2023 edition of Hallowicked was a special concert organized by Psychopathic Records, a record label owned by the horrorcore hip-hop duo, the Insane Clown Posse. The event took place on October 31, 2023 at the Detroit Masonic Temple in Detroit, Michigan and featured performances from the Insane Clown Posse themselves, Ouija Macc, Lardi B, Darby O'Trill, Mike E. Clark, Merkules, and Esham and was aired as a pay-per-view event on various cable and satellite providers. The event also featured professional wrestling matches from Juggalo Championship Wrestling which were featured as highlights on the pay-per-view broadcast. The concert also marked the 30th anniversary of the event which had first been held in 1994.

== Background ==
Hallowicked was founded in 1994 originally to generate attention to the ICP's music after radio station WDVD stopped playing their music on the station. The inaugural concert which took place at the Majestic Theatre in Detroit, Michigan, featured the ICP themselves headlining the concert with Project Born and J.P. The Unknown being the opening acts. To commemorate the concert, 100 cassettes for a single titled "Dead Pumpkins" were handed to attendees. In 1996 during a concert in Toledo, Ohio, Violent J, had suffered a fractured collar bone after moonsaulting off the stage. The show was part of a tour which would've concluded in Detroit, however, the remainder of the tour was cancelled due to the injury.

At the 2010 concert, ICP announced the first album in the second set of Joker's Card albums titled The Mighty Death Pop! which was later released on August 12, 2012 during the Gathering of the Juggalos.

On October 18, 2012, safety concerns from the Royal Oak Police Department had forced the concert which was originally being scheduled to be held at the Royal Oak Music Theatre to be moved to the Fillmore in Detroit, Michigan citing among multiple reasons, the labeling of juggalos as a gang by the Federal Bureau of Investigation.

On October 12, 2023, Psychopathic Records announced that Hallowicked would be returning to the Detroit Masonic Temple. On October 17, 2023, Psychopathic Records announced that the 30th anniversary edition of Hallowicked would air for the first time on pay-per-view via. JuggaloTV.com and on traditional cable and satellite providers.

== Performers ==
- Insane Clown Posse
- Ouija Macc
- Lardi B
- Darby O'Trill
- Mike E. Clark
- Merkules
- Esham
- Insane Clown Posse

== Professional wrestling production ==
=== Storylines ===
JCW's Hallowicked events featured professional wrestling matches that involves different wrestlers from pre-existing scripted feuds and storylines. Wrestlers portrayed villains, heroes, or less distinguishable characters in scripted events that built tension and culminated in a wrestling match or series of matches. Storylines were produced on Juggalo Championship Wrestling's various events.

=== Results ===
No.	Results	Stipulations
1	Real1 defeated Wish Tequila Daze pinfall	Singles match
2	Kongo Kong defeated Jackson Stone by pinfall	Singles match
3	Facade defeated Matthew Justice by pinfall	Singles match
4	Mad Man Pondo defeated JJ Escobar by pinfall	Death match
5	Joshua Bishop (c) defeated Joey Janela by pinfall	Singles match for the JCW Heavyweight Championship
(c) / – the champion(s) heading into the match
