= Hallowicked 2025 =

2025 American concert and professional wrestling event

- Promotional poster
- Date: October 31, 2025
- Venue: Detroit Masonic Temple
- Locations: Detroit, Michigan, United States
- Previous event: 2024
- Next event: 2026
- Organizer: Psychopathic Records

Hallowicked
- Promotion: Juggalo Championship Wrestling
- Date: October 31, 2025 (aired January 1, 2026)
- City: Detroit, Michigan
- Venue: Detroit Masonic Temple

Juggalo Championship Wrestling event chronology
← Previous; 2 Tuff Country	Next → Big Ballas Holiday Party

Hallowicked chronology
← Previous; 2024	Next → 2026

The 2025 edition of Hallowicked was a special concert organized by Psychopathic Records, a record label owned by the horrorcore hip-hop duo, the Insane Clown Posse. The event took place on October 31, 2025 at the Detroit Masonic Temple in Detroit, Michigan and featured performances from the Insane Clown Posse themselves, Alla Xul Elu, Ouija Macc, and local rappers Trick-Trick and King Gordy. The event also featured professional wrestling matches from Juggalo Championship Wrestling (JCW) which aired on tape delay on January 1, 2026 as a special episode of JCW Lunacy on YouTube and Facebook.

== Background ==
Hallowicked was founded in 1994 originally to generate attention to the ICP's music after radio station WDVD stopped playing their music on the station. The inaugural concert which took place at the Majestic Theatre in Detroit, Michigan, featured the ICP themselves headlining the concert with Project Born and J.P. The Unknown being the opening acts. To commemorate the concert, 100 cassettes for a single titled "Dead Pumpkins" were handed to attendees. In 1996 during a concert in Toledo, Ohio, Violent J, had suffered a fractured collar bone after moonsaulting off the stage. The show was part of a tour which would've concluded in Detroit, however, the remainder of the tour was cancelled due to the injury.

At the 2010 concert, ICP announced the first album in the second set of Joker's Card albums titled The Mighty Death Pop! which was later released on August 12, 2012 during the Gathering of the Juggalos.

On October 18, 2012, safety concerns from the Royal Oak Police Department had forced the concert which was originally being scheduled to be held at the Royal Oak Music Theatre to be moved to the Fillmore in Detroit, Michigan citing among multiple reasons, the labeling of juggalos as a gang by the Federal Bureau of Investigation.

From October 23, 2024 to October 29, 2024, Insane Clown Posse organized the Train of Terror Tour which built to their annual Hallowicked concert in Detroit, Michigan and featured Ouija Macc, Shaggy The Airhead, Wakko The Kidd, Monster Wolf along with live episodes of JCW Lunacy on each night of the tour.

== Performers ==
- Insane Clown Posse
- Alla Xul Elu
- Ouija Macc
- Trick-Trick
- King Gordy

== Professional wrestling production ==
Other on-screen personnel
Role:	Name:
Disc jockey	DJ Clay
Commentators	Joe Dombrowski
Commentators	Zac Amico
Ring announcer	Mark Roberts

=== Background ===
On the October 24, 2025 episode of JCW Lunacy which was taped on September 17, 2025 at the Minglewood Hall in Memphis, Tennessee, talent from Memphis Wrestling would make their JCW debuts including the Disorderlies, Big John Dalton, Tim Bosby, Xya Wolf, Ray Sanders, Nyxx, and the Shocker. The main event would consist of 2 Tuff Tony defending the JCW Heavyweight Championship against former WWE ID wrestler Aaron Roberts. At the end of the match, Vampiro set up an ambush where he debuted the "Trifecta of Terror" which consisted of Mickie Knuckles and Mad Man Pondo who had been previously released from JCW amid the aftermath of Powder Keg.

During the 2 Tuff Country special, Matt Cardona would challenge 2 Tuff Tony for the JCW Heavyweight Championship. In addition to the main event, the special would also feature Haley J winning the JCW Women's Championship after defeating Alice Crowley and would also feature Kerry Morton winning the JCW Battle Royal Championship in the 2 Tuff Country Rumble after throwing his father Ricky Morton over the top rope.

On the November 6, 2025 episode of Lunacy which was taped on October 20, 2025, Big Vito would make his JCW debut when he was revealed as the enforcer of a "mystery investor". Vito would continue to make appearances and butt heads with Violent J until the debut of the "mystery investor". On October 26, 2025, Vince Russo, a high-profile pro wrestling writer and booker, was announced as an on-screen investor in JCW and would take up the role of the lead writer for the promotion.

=== Storylines ===
JCW's Hallowicked events featured professional wrestling matches that involves different wrestlers from pre-existing scripted feuds and storylines. Wrestlers portrayed villains, heroes, or less distinguishable characters in scripted events that built tension and culminated in a wrestling match or series of matches. Storylines were produced on Juggalo Championship Wrestling's various events and their weekly streaming program JCW Lunacy.

=== Aftermath ===
During the main event of the JCW Lunacy Hallowicked taping, Matt Cardona defeated 2 Tuff Tony to win the JCW Heavyweight Championship. One day after the episode aired, it was announced that Matt Cardona had signed a contract with WWE and made his return on Friday Night SmackDown on January 2, 2026 and would vacate all of the championships he had held before signing including the JCW Heavyweight Championship.

=== Results ===
No.	Results	Stipulations	Times
1^{D}	James Storm defeated Kerry Morton, Matt Cross, Mecha Wolf, Mosh Pit Mike, and Shane Mercer by pinfall	Six-way match	—
2	St. Claire Monster Corporation (Beastman, Kongo Kong, and Mr. Happy) (with Jasmin St. Claire) defeated Flowe Caine (Cocaine and Steven Flowe) and Ninja Mack by pinfall	Six-man tag team match	3:30
3	Caleb Konley (with Jeeves and The Ring Rat) defeated Willie Mack by pinfall	Singles match	7:23
4	Dani Mo and Haley J (with Amazing Maria) defeated Jody Threat and Katrina Creed by pinfall	Tag team match	5:54
5	The Outbreak (Abel Booker and Jacksyn Crowley) (with Barnabas The Bizarre) defeated The Brothers of Funstruction (Ruffo The Clown and Yabo The Clown) (c) by pinfall	Tag team match for the JCW World Tag Team Championship	10:16
6	Matt Cardona defeated 2 Tuff Tony (c) by pinfall	Singles match for the JCW Heavyweight Championship	6:31
(c) / – the champion(s) heading into the match; D / – this was a dark match
