= The South Park Psycho =

Studio album by Ganksta N-I-P
- Released: February 25, 1992
- Recorded: 1991–1992
- Genre: Horrorcore; gangsta rap; hardcore hip hop
- Label: Rap-a-Lot; Priority
- Producer: Ganksta N-I-P; The Terrorists; John Bido; Doug King

Ganksta N-I-P chronology
The South Park Psycho (1992)	Psychic Thoughts (Are What I Conceive?) (1993)

The South Park Psycho is the debut studio album by the rapper Ganksta N-I-P. It was released on February 25, 1992, through Rap-a-Lot Records. The album has production from Ganksta N-I-P, The Terrorists, John Bido and Doug King. The album is one of the earliest examples of the horrorcore genre, and is considered to be a Southern hip hop classic.

Guest artists include future routine collaborators, Dope-E, K-Rino, and Seagram. Willie D and Scarface, then of the Geto Boys, also appear on the track "Actions Speak Louder Than Words". This song also appears on the Geto Boys' first greatest hits collection, the 1992 release, Uncut Dope: Geto Boys' Best.

A sequel, South Park Psycho 2: Back to the Beginning, was released on January 10, 2025.

== Reception ==
Professional ratings
Review scores
Source	Rating
AllMusic	4/5 stars

The album peaked at No. 63 on the US Billboard Top R&B/Hip-Hop Albums chart. The album has long been out-of-print. It gained four stars out of five from AllMusic. The album sold around 100,000 units around the South Park area and helped N-I-P to obtain a recording contract with Priority Records. The song "Psycho" was ranked No. 3 most violent hip hop song of all time by Complex.

== Track listing ==
1. "Intro" – 1:58 (Producer: Dope-E)
2. "Horror Movie Rap" – 3:35 (Producer: Egypt E)
3. "Get Out of the Game" – 5:14 (feat. Dope-E)
4. "Rough Brothers from South Park" – 5:24 (feat. K-Rino, Dope-E, Point Blank)
5. "Black Godfather" – 5:03
6. "Psycho" – 4:20
7. "Action Speaks Louder Than Words" – 5:53 (feat. Scarface, Willie D, Seagram)
8. "Ganksta Mac" – 4:43
9. "Smokin' Amp" – 3:55
10. "Disgusting" – 4:39
11. "H Town" – 4:44 (Producer: Dope-E)
12. "Slaughter" – 4:19
13. "Paranoid" – 4:36
14. "Damned Shame" – 4:20

== Samples ==
- "Horror Movie Rap": Soundtrack from Halloween
- "Psycho": "CEBU" by Commodores
- "Action Speaks Louder Than Words": "Action Speaks Louder Than Words" by Chocolate Milk
- "Disgusting": "Nautilus" by Bob James
- "Slaughter": "Straight Outta Compton" by N.W.A
- "Paranoid": "Stranglehold" by Ted Nugent
- "Damned Shame": "Dead Homiez" by Ice Cube

== Later samples ==
"Psycho"

"That's How It Is: Psychic, Pt. 2" on the album Psychic Thoughtsby Ganksta N-I-P
"Fuck You" on the album Psychic Thoughts by Ganksta N-I-P
"Still Psycho" on the album Still Psycho by Ganksta N-I-P
"The Violence of the Lambs" on the album Acid Reflexby Paris

- "Paranoid"

"Skitso" on the album Little Big Man by Bushwick Bill

== Credits ==
- Engineer: Peter Reardon
- Mixed by: Bido
- Production co-ordinator: Tony Randle
- Producer: Crazy C, Doug King, Ganksta N-I-P*, John Bido, The Terrorists
- Written by: Dope E, Ganksta N-I-P, Scarface, Seagram, Willie D

== Charts ==
Chart (1992)	Peak position
Top R&B Albums	63
