= Collision Course (1989 film) =

1989 film by Lewis Teague

- The DVD artwork for Collision Course.
- Directed by: Lewis Teague
- Written by: Frank Darius Namei; Robert Resnikoff
- Produced by: Ted Field; Robert W. Cort
- Starring: Jay Leno; Pat Morita; Chris Sarandon; Al Waxman; Soon-Tek Oh; Tom Noonan
- Cinematography: Donald E. Thorin
- Music by: Ira Newborn
- Production company: Interscope Communications
- Distributed by: De Laurentiis Entertainment Group
- Release dates: April 27, 1989 (Germany); May 6, 1992 (United States)
- Running time: 100 minutes
- Country: United States
- Language: English
- Budget: $13 million

Collision Course is a 1989 American action comedy film starring Jay Leno as a Detroit police officer and Pat Morita as a Japanese officer forced to work together to recover a Japanese turbocharger stolen by a thief played by Chris Sarandon. It was directed by Lewis Teague and unreleased in the U.S. until 1992, when it debuted on home video.

The story plays upon the culture clash between Detroit - whose economy is largely built on automobile manufacturing - and Japan - whose trade policies and export of cars were blamed for Detroit job losses in the 1980s.

== Plot ==
Oshima attempts to sell a revolutionary turbo charger to an auto maker headed by Derek Jarryd. However, the deal is being brokered by two goons, Scully and Kosnic. When Oshima backs out at the last second, explaining he has hidden the turbo charger, he is tortured and hung upside down, where he has a fatal heart attack, dying before he can disclose the location of the turbo charger. The manager at the junkyard stumbles upon what is going on, and is shot with a rocket gun by Scully, killing him. Detective Tony Costas is called in to investigate, but is removed by his captain when they realize the junkyard manager is a former partner of Costas. Despite being told to back off the case, Costas enlists the help of his partner, Shortcut. Arriving in America at this time is Fujitsuka Natsuo, assigned by his boss, Kitao.

Racist homicide lieutenant Dingman basically refuses to investigate the murder of a Japanese national, so Costas takes it upon himself to search Oshima's hotel room and catches Natsuo there looking for the turbocharger. Costas and Dingman are both read the riot act by their inspector, but soon, Natsuo and Costas begin their own investigation after Natsuo finally admits the real reason he is in America.

After Natsuo poses as a reporter asking Jarryd about the new Turbo Charger, Jarryd is escorted away by Scully, tasked with watching over Jarryd by a corrupt crime boss named Madras. Jarryd had taken a loan from Madras, who now controls Jarryd in order to make sure he gets a solid return on his "investment".

After seeing Scully being rough with Jarryd, both Natsuo and Costas deem Scully as worth following. Thanks to police work by Shorty, they learn of Scully's address and Natsuo and Costas go to his home. They break in and find that Scully's home is an armed fortress. Scully arrives and notices Costas and Natsuo. After a quick phone call to Madras, it is determined both men are to be killed. As they are searching Scully's home, Natsuo notices Scully aiming a rocket launcher at his own home. Both men escape just before the house blows up. They engage Scully in a gun fight that ends when Natsuo, who had accidentally stolen a grenade from Scully's home, gives the grenade to Costas, who tosses it out of the train car in which the men are hiding. Scully, being told it was directions to the Turbo Charger's location wrapped around a rock, is killed when the grenade goes off.

An angered Costas confronts Madras, and he is suspended from the force and Natsuo is requested to return home, in disgrace. However, both Costas and Natsuo outwit Dingman, who had been assigned to see that Natsuo got on his plane back to Japan. Both men continue their investigation which leads them to an auto shop where Oshima placed it in the car he had rented. After a brief gun battle with Kosnic and some goons, Costas and Natsuo make their way the rental company and locate Oshima's car. This time, they are chased by Madras and his goons, briefly interrupting an auto race taking place on Detroit's streets. After they crash the car, Costas and Natsuo steal a motorcycle, which they later crash as well. With his goons stripping the car, Madras drives off in pursuit. After locating Costas and Natsuo, he shoots Costas and attempts to run down Natsuo, who despite Costas' plea has begun to run towards the car. Natsuo delivers a kamikaze attack on Madras, kicking through the windshield and hitting Madras so hard the force of the strike decapitates him. With the car going out of control, Costas rolls out of the way. He recovers in time to rescue Natsuo from the hood of the car, which has now crashed, right before the car explodes.

In an airport, Natsuo prepares to go home to Japan, with Oshima's body but no turbo charger. However, Costas has arranged for a police woman to deliver the part to him so he could in turn, help his partner save face with his boss in Japan. Both newfound friends then say their good-byes.

== Production ==
The film was made by Dino De Laurentiis' De Laurentiis Entertainment Group (DEG). Jay Leno was a popular stand up comic when approached to play the lead. He said, "I wanted to do a funny, commercial movie and I also wanted to do a PG movie." Leno added, "the character I play is not far from me except I beat up guys who are a lot bigger than I would beat up in normal circumstances. I'm kind of like Dean Martin playing Matt Helm."

Rehearsals began in April 1987. The original director was John Guillermin, who had made King Kong and King Kong Lives for De Laurentiis. He left the project in pre-production forcing the shoot to be pushed back for four weeks. Guillermin was replaced by Bob Clark, who had made From the Hip for De Laurentiis. Clark was on the film for nine days, including the start of production, before leaving. He was replaced in late May by Lewis Teague who had made Cat's Eye for De Laurentiis.

Leno said "When we saw the early film [that Clark shot]... it just wasn't funny... Lewis came in and everything was changed at the last minute," said Leno. "But he's been real good about being open to suggestions. I like Lewis. He's a good action director and I trust his sense of humor."

Much of the principal photography for the film was shot on location in Detroit, Michigan. Numerous local landmarks are shown in various scenes, including the now-defunct Trapper's Alley in the city's Greektown Historic District neighborhood and the Garden Bowl within the Majestic Theatre Centre—the United States' oldest continuously operating bowling alley. Other parts of the movie were filmed in Wilmington, North Carolina.

While making the film Leno was given a regular Monday night slot on The Tonight Show. He performed ten different stand up shows but his management said he did not miss a day of filming.

When Morita guest-starred on The Tonight Show in 1989, with Leno serving as guest host, they recalled that the movie had run out of money on the last day of filming, with key scenes yet to be shot and no budget left for editing and post-production.

When Dino de Laurentiis went bankrupt the film fell into the hands of Wells Fargo Bank. The film was given a video release in 1992 to cash in on Jay Leno taking over as permanent host of The Tonight Show.

== Cast ==
- Pat Morita as Inspector Fujitsuka Natsuo
- Jay Leno as Detective Tony Costas
- Chris Sarandon as Madras
- Tom Noonan as Scully
- Dennis Holahan as Derrick Jarryd
- Ernie Hudson as "Shortcut"
- John Hancock as Lieutenant Ryerson
- Al Waxman as Dingman
- Soon-Tek Oh as Chief Inspector Kitao
- Randall "Tex" Cobb as Kosnic
- Danny Kamekona as Oshima
- Angela Leslie as Girl At Photo Shop
- Mike Starr as Autoworker
- Ron Taylor as Autoworker #2
- Claudia Abel as Model At Auto Show

== Release ==
Filming started on Collision Course took place between May and August of 1987. Originally John Guillermin was hired to direct, but was replaced by Bob Clark. Clark would eventually leave the film which would be completed by credited director Lewis Teague.

Following the bankruptcy of production company De Laurentiis Entertainment Group the film premiered on HBO five years after the film had been completed. According to producer Robert W. Cort, following De Laurnetis Entertainment Group's bankruptcy the film ended up with Wells Fargo Bank who were looking to offload the film at full price but were unable to find any buyers. When Jay Leno took over The Tonight Show from Johnny Carson, HBO Video decided to take advantage of the publicity and acquired distribution rights. Both Leno and his manager Helen Kushnick were both displeased with the film's release with Kushnick publicly distancing Leno from the release and saying HBO Video was taking advantage of Leno's current position. In the one sheet and promotional materials for the film the film marketed itself as being "from the makers of The Jewel of the Nile, Airplane! and Airplane II: The Sequel, with a publicist for HBO saying the Airplane! connection came from Cort's work on those film's with Cort stating after the fact he'd never worked on the Airplane! films.

The film was released on direct-to-video on May 6, 1992 by HBO Video.
