= Juggalo Weekend 2024 =

2024 music festival

- Promotional poster
- Date: February 23–24, 2024
- Venue: Boeing Center at Tech Port
- Locations: San Antonio, Texas, United States
- Previous event: 2022
- Next event: 2025
- Organizer: Psychopathic Records

Juggalo Weekend
- promotional poster
- Promotion: Juggalo Championship Wrestling
- Date: February 23–24, 2024
- City: San Antonio, Texas
- Venue: Boeing Center at Tech Port

Juggalo Championship Wrestling event chronology
← Previous; Hallowicked	Next → Juggalos Strike Back

The 2024 Juggalo Weekend was a two-day music festival organized by Psychopathic Records, a record label owned by the horrorcore hip-hop duo, the Insane Clown Posse. The event took place from February 23, 2024 to February 24, 2024 at the Boeing Center at Tech Port in San Antonio, Texas. The event also featured professional wrestling from Juggalo Championship Wrestling (JCW) with one match airing on the second and fourth episodes of JCW Lunacy on YouTube.

== Background ==
The festival began in 2012 as a way to celebrate what was dubbed "Juggalo Day" which was February 17th. The day, according to the Insane Clown Posse, was meant to celebrate the identity of the juggalos. Over the years, the festival would also have special sets from Insane Clown Posse that were meant to represent their different setlists from previous shows. During the 2013 Juggalo Day weekend, the Insane Clown Posse performed a special "Riddle Box Show" set which featured all of the tracks from the Riddle Box album. In 2014, the Insane Clown Posse peformed a Great Milenko-themed set in Columbus, Ohio. In 2015, the Insane Clown Posse held a Take Me Home charity show during the Juggalo Day weekend at the Detroit Masonic Temple in Detroit.

2017 would see Juggalo Weekend make its debut in Florida at Jannus Live in St. Petersburg, Florida and in Canada at the Stampede Corral in Calgary, Alberta. In 2018, Juggalo Weekend made its debut on the West coast when the event took place at the Fremont Country Club in Las Vegas, Nevada.

On December 13, 2024, after a one-year absence, Psychopathic Records announced that Juggalo Weekend 2024 would take place from February 23–24, 2024 at the Boeing Center at Tech Port in San Antonio, Texas. On January 12, 2024, Psychopathic Records announced that Insane Clown Posse would be performing a Wicked Wonka Tour set during the festival. On January 23, 2024, Psychopathic Records announced that Juggalo Championship Wrestling (JCW) would be returning to Juggalo Weekend. On February 6, 2024, it was announced that Insane Clown Posse would be performing a Super Mix Juggalo Jukebox set which would feature tracks that had not been performed by ICP on any of their concerts up to that point. On February 12, 2024, Psychopathic Records announced that Darby O'Trill would be performing at the festival on the first day. On February 16, 2024, it was announced that the JCW events at the festival would be titled The Awakening.

== Performers ==
The lineup for Juggalo Weekend 2024 included Psychopathic Records artists Ouija Macc and Wakko The Kidd, Gloom Unit member Acetone, Motown Rage member Mr. Sadistic, Chapter 17 Records artist Darby O'Trill, Ear House Inc. owner and Bone Thugs-n-Harmony member Krizz Kaliko, Cleopatra Records artists the Kottonmouth Kings, Forilla, and Paranoid Records artist Shade. Both nights of the festival were headlined by the Insane Clown Posse.

Friday (February 14)	Saturday (February 15)
Mr. Sadistic; Ouija Macc; Wakko The Kidd; Darby O'Trill; Acetone; Insane Clown Posse's Super Mix Juggalo Jukebox Show	Shade; Forilla; Krizz Kaliko; Kottonmouth Kings; Layzie Bone; Insane Clown Posse Wicked Wonka Show

== Professional wrestling production ==
=== Storylines ===
Juggalo Weekend featured professional wrestling matches that involves different wrestlers from pre-existing scripted feuds and storylines. Wrestlers portrayed villains, heroes, or less distinguishable characters in scripted events that built tension and culminated in a wrestling match or series of matches. Storylines were produced on Juggalo Championship Wrestling's various events.

=== Results ===
Day 1 - February 23, 2024
No.	Results	Stipulations	Times
1	Nick Gage defeated Officer Colt Cabana by pinfall	Singles match	5:53
2	Willie Mack defeated Alex Taylor, Bino Bleu, Boss Baines, Caramel Lightning, Dyl Dempsey, Hurtful Kurt, James Ellsworth, Kerry Morton, Kobe Dalen Payne, Kongo Kong, Landon Chavez, Mosh Pit Mike, Mystii Marks, Painful Paul, Rodney Mack, Ruffo The Clown, Silas Mason, Sodapop and Stewy The Clown, The Executioner Verdugo, Xavier Gotti, Yabo The Clown, and Zusz	Battle royal for the vacant JCW Heavyweight Championship	—

Day 2 - February 24, 2024
No.	Results	Stipulations	Times
1	Mad Man Pondo defeated Dimitri Alexandrov by pinfall	Death match	9:34
