= Noir Leather =

Noir Leather is a Detroit-area leather and fetish gear shop.

== Overview ==
Noir has been a Detroit cultural icon since September 1981. Owned and operated by Keith Howarth since the beginning, it began as a wholesale leather company and expanded into a storefront on 3rd St. in Royal Oak Michigan USA, Opening on December 17, 1983. Throughout the years it has been an innovative advertiser and has had heavy involvement in the local fetish/goth scene. In the mid-90s, Keith owned 4 stores: Noir Leather, Vintage Noir, Faith Couture, and Noir Windsor Canada. Noir Leather Wholesale Division employed young creative punk-rockers who designed & created punk & S&M inspired leather items such as collars, wrist bands, boot straps & belts. A Gothic jewelry line of necklaces, cross earrings, rosary's & bracelets were also introduced. These products were sold to Punk Shops across North America, Asia, & Europe.

During this time Keith began doing live shows at the State Theatre in Detroit, which drew large attendances upwards of 2,500 people. As the years passed the Noir Leather empire has consolidated into a single store front, which was the original Vintage Noir location at 124 W 4th St, Royal Oak MI 48067 USA. Today Noir Leather continues as a brick & mortar boutique which is open 6 days week, closed Tuesdays. Noir continues to support the local fetish scene by sponsoring events and hosting its famed Hellbound fetish parties and Erotic Fashion Shows.
