= Psych' Swag: Da Horror Movie =

Studio album by Ganxsta N.I.P
- Released: February 8, 2010
- Recorded: 2009–2010
- Genres: Horrorcore; gangsta rap; hardcore hip hop
- Length: 53:17
- Label: Psych Ward Entertainment
- Producer: Ganxsta N.I.P

Ganxsta N.I.P chronology
Still Psycho (2008)	Psych' Swag: Da Horror Movie (2010)	H-Town Legend: Still Gettin It In (2012)

Psych' Swag: Da Horror Movie is the eighth studio album by Horrorcore rapper Ganxsta N.I.P and was released in 2010. It is his second album to be released on his independent record label 'Psych Ward Entertainment'. The album consists of 14 songs. It has no guests appeared on the album.

== Track list ==
1. "N.I.P. Is Coming" 3:33
2. "Rick Ross'n" 5:04
3. "Back From Da Grave" 4:11
4. "Once Upon A Time" 4:14
5. "Hustle Man" 3:43
6. "If Da Bullets Could Talk" 3:09
7. "Keep It Ganxsta" 3:26
8. "Psych Swag" 3:17
9. "Mail Man (Recession)" 3:17
10. "Strip Club" 3:36
11. "Don’t Be Scared" 3:25
12. "Da Reaper Is Back" 3:49
13. "F*ck You Haters" 3:51
14. "I'm A Psycho" 4:42

== Personnel ==
Artist	Credit
Bido 1	Producer
Candyman	Producer
Ganxsta N.I.P	Composer
J Blast	Engineer, Mixing
Mike B.	Producer
M.J. Williams	Executive Producer
N'tense Designz	Graphic Designer

== Samples ==
- Rick Ross’n
  - Hustlin' by Rick Ross
