= Psycho Thug =

Studio album by Ganxsta NIP
- Released: May 18, 1999
- Recorded: 1999
- Genres: Horrorcore; gangsta rap; hardcore hip hop
- Length: 50:57
- Label: Happy Alone Records
- Producers: 151 Productions; Bishop; Dope E; J Slash; J.B.; Scagnetti "Al" Capone

Ganxsta NIP chronology
Interview with a Killa (1998)	Psycho Thug (1999)	The Return!!! (of the Psychopath) (2003)

Psycho Thug is the fifth album released by rapper, Ganxsta NIP. It was released on May 18, 1999 through independent label, Happy Alone Records and was produced by 151 Productions, Bishop, Dope E, J Slash, J.B. and Scagnetti "Al" Capone. This was Ganxsta NIP's first album not released through Rap-a-Lot Records.

== Track listing ==
1. "Intro"- :50
2. "Keep Striving"- 4:09
3. "We Finna Come Up"- 3:38 (Feat. Dope-E)
4. "Lil Mama's"- 3:44 (Feat. 1-Shot, Bishop)
5. "Snitch Niggas"- 3:48 (Feat. Big Ron, Bishop)
6. "Keep It Real"- 4:02 (Feat. Point Blank)
7. "Pimp Niggas"- 3:58
8. "Psycho Thug!"- 4:03
9. "Candy Man Chant"- 4:11
10. "Do You Like Scary Movies"- 3:06
11. "Graveyard"- 3:03
12. "Insect Warground"- 3:16
13. "Mood Swings"- 4:56
14. "Psych' Ward"- 4:13 (Feat. 1-Shot, Big Ron, Bishop)

== Personnel ==
Executive Producer - Robert Guillerman

Producer - 151 Productions* (tracks: 7, 8, 12), J.B. (tracks: 2, 6, 9, 10)

== Samples ==
- Keep It Real
- "Keep It Real" By MC Ren
