= The Dark Roads =

Studio album by Seagram
- Released: June 1, 1992
- Recorded: 1991–1992
- Genre: Gangsta rap, horrorcore, G-funk, West Coast hip-hop
- Length: 57:31
- Label: Rap-A-Lot, Priority
- Producer: J. Prince (exec.), Mark Anthony, Troy White

Seagram chronology
The Dark Roads (1992)	Reality Check (1994)

Professional ratings
Review scores
Source	Rating
AllMusic	2.5/5 stars

The Dark Roads is the debut album by American rapper Seagram, released 1992 on Rap-A-Lot Records and Priority Records. The album features guest performances by labelmates Scarface, Ganksta N-I-P, Bushwick Bill and Willie D. It peaked at number 74 on the Billboard Top R&B/Hip-Hop Albums chart.

Along with a single, a music video was produced for the song, "The Vill".

== Background ==
The album features the violent but intelligent single "The Vill" in which Seagram raps about the hard lifestyle of Oakland G's. The album also showcases the song "Straight Mobbin" featuring Gangsta P which was a groundbreaking song for the izzle slang. Seagram and Gangsta P are two of the first known rappers to have recorded an entire song using only izz and izzle words. Rappers such as Snoop Dogg would later use this style into the new millennium.

== Track listing ==
1. "Straight Mobbin'" (featuring Gangsta P) - 5:53
2. "2 For 1" - 5:01
3. "Get Off My Zipper" - 3:36
4. "Reap What You Sew" (featuring Vell) - 3:53
5. "The Dark Roads" - 5:24
6. "Action Speaks Louder Than Words" (featuring Scarface, Ganksta NIP & Willie D) - 5:50
7. "I Got Em" (Skit) - 1:03
8. "The Vill" (featuring Vell) - 5:20
9. "Die Hard" - 4:06
10. "Dedication" - 3:57
11. "Squeeze the Trigger" - 5:02
12. "I Don't Give a Fuck" - 4:12
13. "Wages of Sin" (featuring Bushwick Bill & Ganksta NIP) - 4:07

== Samples ==
I Don't Give a F***

- "Genius of Love" by Tom Tom Club

Squeeze the Trigger

- "Get Up, Stand Up" by Bob Marley and The Wailers

The Dark Roads

- "The Message" By Grandmaster Flash and the Furious Five
- Contains dialogue from The Mack

== Chart history ==
Chart (1993)	Peak position
U.S. Top R&B/Hip-Hop Albums (Billboard)	74
