= The Return of the Psychopath =

The Return!!! (of the Psychopath)

Studio album by Ganxsta NIP
- Released: November 11, 2003
- Recorded: 2003
- Genres: Horrorcore, gangsta rap, hardcore hip hop
- Label: Rest In Peace Records / Black Market Records
- Producers: Mars, 151 Productions, Dope E, J.B. Money, K-Rino

Ganxsta NIP chronology
| Psycho Thug (1999) | The Return!!! (of the Psychopath) (2003) | Still Psycho (2008) |

The Return!!! (of the Psychopath) is the sixth album released by rapper, Ganxsta NIP. It was released on November 11, 2003, through Rest In Peace / Black Market Records and featured production from 151, Dope E, J.B. Money and K-Rino. The entire project was headed by Mars.

== Track listing ==
1. "Intro"
2. "The Return!!!"
3. "Fight & Fuck 2 Much" (skit)
4. "Any M-Fucker" (Feat. Dope-E)
5. "In the Mix"
6. "South Park"
7. "Psych' Ballin'"
8. "Born Genius"
9. "Fed Up!!"
10. "Originator"
11. "Regime Change" (Feat. Dope-E, Lil' Lo)
12. "Purchase a Ticket"
13. "Do You Like Scary Movies?"
14. "Insect Warground"
15. "Murderer"
16. "Bussin' Rounds" (Feat. A.C. Chill, DBX, Greek, K-Rino)

== Personnel ==
Executive Producer - Cedric Singleton
