= Garden Bowl =

- U.S. National Register of Historic Places
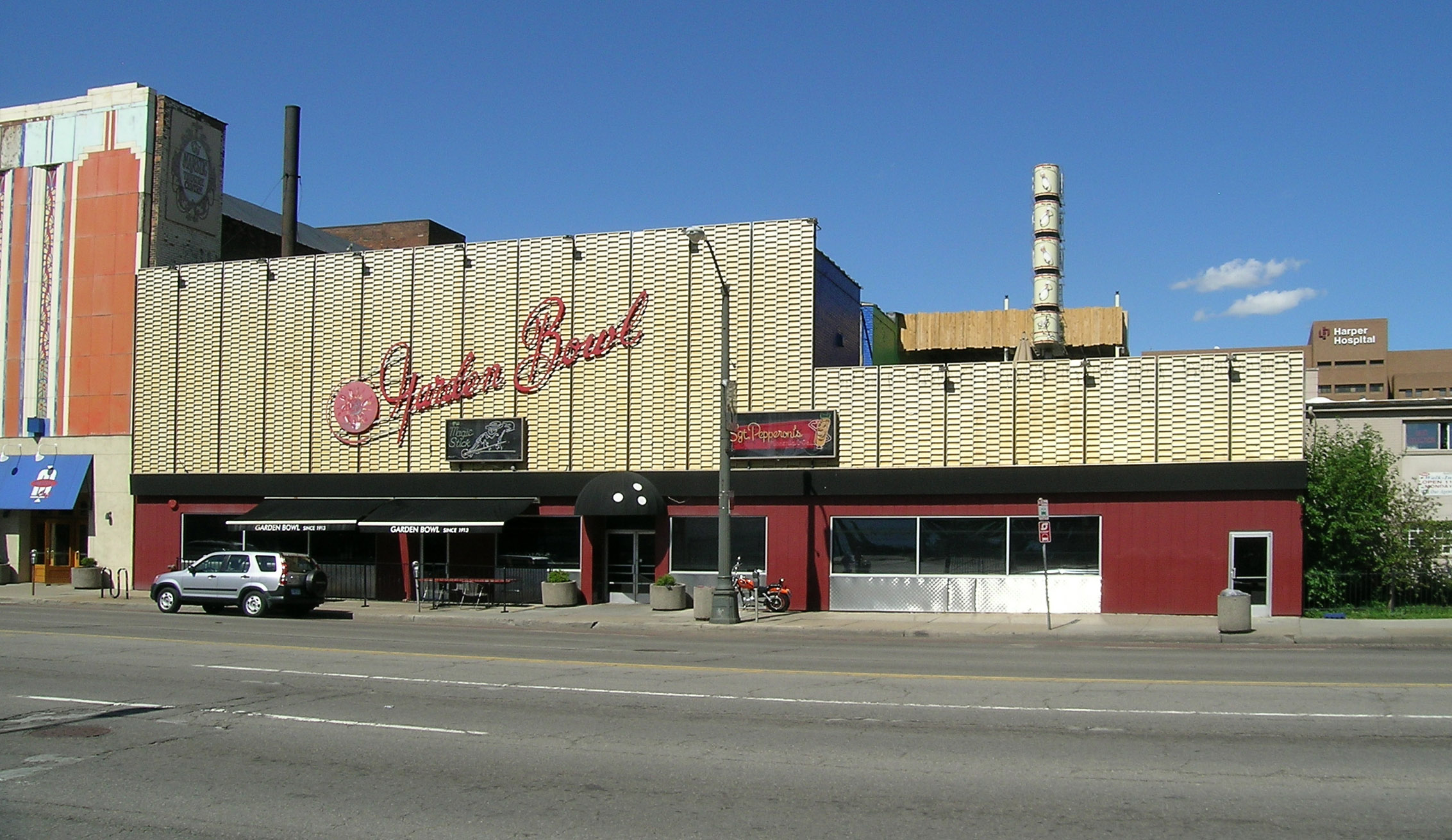
- Garden Bowl from across Woodward

- Location within Michigan Location within the United States
- Interactive map
- Location: 4104–4120 Woodward Avenue, Detroit, Michigan
- Coordinates: 42°21′4.5″N 83°3′36″W
- Built: 1913
- Part of: Majestic Theatre Center (Majestic Theatres)
- NRHP reference No.: 08000578
- Added to NRHP: July 3, 2008

The Garden Bowl is a 16-lane Brunswick bowling alley located at 4104–4120 Woodward Avenue in Midtown Detroit, Michigan. It is the oldest continuously operating bowling alley in the country. It was listed on the National Register of Historic Places in 2008.

== History ==
The Garden Bowl was built in 1913, and is Detroit's oldest continuously operating bowling alley. In 1934, the front 35 feet of the building were removed when Woodward Avenue was widened to its present size. The present appearance of the building is due in large part to changes made in 1966.

== Current use ==
The father of the current owner purchased the Garden Bowl in 1946. The Garden Bowl operates as part of the Majestic Theater Center, which includes the nearby Majestic Theatre, the Majestic Cafe, the Magic Stick (located upstairs in the same building as the Garden Bowl), and Sgt. Pepperoni's. It continues to operate as a bowling alley.

== Film and TV ==
Scenes from the 1989 direct-to-video film Collision Course were shot at the Garden Bowl.
