= My Homies =

Studio album by Scarface
- Released: March 3, 1998
- Genre: Hip hop
- Length: 136:33
- Label: Rap-A-Lot
- Producers: J. Prince (exec.); Scarface (exec.); Tony Randle (exec.); 88 Keys; Domo; Joe Bythewood; John Bido; Jo Jo; Mike Dean; Mr. Lee; N.O. Joe; Precise; Rag Tag; Tone Capone

Scarface chronology
The Untouchable (1997)	My Homies (1998)	The Last of a Dying Breed (2000)

Singles from My Homies
- 1. "Homies & Thuggs" Released: January 20, 1998; 2. "Sex Faces" Released: February 17, 1998; 3. "Win Lose Or Draw" Released: April 6, 1998

Professional ratings
Review scores
Source	Rating
AllMusic	3.5/5 stars
Chicago Tribune	3.5/4 stars
RapReviews	7/10
The Rolling Stone Album Guide	3/5 stars
The Source	4/5 stars

My Homies is the fifth studio album by an American rapper Scarface. It was released March 3, 1998, by J. Prince's Rap-A-Lot Records. The album features production by Mike Dean, Mr. Lee, N.O. Joe, Scarface, and Tone Capone. Upon its release, My Homies peaked at number 4 on the US Billboard 200, becoming a certified platinum by the Recording Industry Association of America (RIAA) as of April 6, 1998. The album features guest performances from 2Pac, Master P, Ice Cube, Devin the Dude, B-Legit, UGK, Too Short, Do or Die, and Willie D. Scarface appeared solo onto two out of thirty songs, while performing with others on thirteen (track 1-11 only having him talk over the beat) and does not contribute vocals on fifteen (Scarface is not on tracks 1-2, 1-3, 1-9, 1-10, 1-13, 1-14, 1-15, 2-1, 2-2, 2-4, 2-6, 2-10, 2-12, 2-13 & 2-15). The sequel to the album, My Homies Part 2, was released on March 7, 2006.

Along with singles, music videos were produced for the songs: "Homies & Thuggs", featuring 2Pac and Master P and "Sex Faces", featuring Too Short, Tela and Devin the Dude. In the original of "Homies & Thuggs", 2Pac's verse was later added. The song, "Sleepin' In My Nikes", was originally released on the Seagram album, Souls on Ice. The solo track, "Boo Boo'n", was later re-released on the Devin the Dude album, The Dude.

== Track listing ==
Disc 1
No.	Title	Writer(s)	Producer(s)	Length
1.	"My Homies" (Scarface solo)	B. Jordan	Scarface; Mike Dean; Domo	5:49
2.	"Hustler" (featuring Hoodlumz and F.L.A.J.)	B. Ware; T. McCollum	Mr. Lee	3:56
3.	"Do What You Do" (featuring Bushwick Bill, K.B., and B-Legit)	A. Gilmour; B. Jones; K. Brown	Tone Capone	3:08
4.	"Southside: Houston, Texas" (featuring Devin the Dude and Tela)	B. Jordan; D. Copeland; J. Bido	Scarface; John Bido	4:35
5.	"Don't Testify" (featuring Facemob and Hoodlumz)	B. Jordan; H. Armstrong; J. Dorcy	Scarface; Mr. Lee	3:51
6.	"Homies & Thuggs (The Remix)" (featuring Master P, Doracell, and 2Pac)	B. Jordan; J. Hutchins; L. Smith; P. Miller; T. Shakur	N.O. Joe	5:39
7.	"The Geto" (featuring Willie D, Ice Cube, and K.B.)	B. Jordan; K. Brown; O. Jackson; W. Dennis	N.O. Joe	5:20
8.	"Fuck Faces" (featuring Too Short, Tela, and Devin the Dude)	B. Jordan; D. Copeland; T. Shaw; W. Rogers	Scarface; Mike Dean	6:17
9.	"What's Goin' On" (featuring A-G-2-A-Ke)	B. Jordan; G. Talley; K. Kinlow	88 Keys	4:28
10.	"2 Real" (featuring Mr. 3-2, UGK, and F.L.A.J.)	B. Jordan; B. Freeman; C. Butler; C. Barriere	Scarface; Mr. Lee	4:43
11.	"Rules 4 the Real Niggas" (featuring Hoodlumz)	B. Jordan; B. Ware; T. McCollum	Scarface; Mr. Lee	3:56
12.	"Win Lose or Draw" (featuring Johnny P., DMG, and Lo-Ke)	B. Jordan; H. Armstrong; T. McCollum	Scarface; Mike Dean; Mr. Lee	5:16
13.	"Overnight" (featuring Do or Die, Rock Roc, and Snypaz)	B. Jordan; D. Warren; R. Flynn; C. Paxton; D. Round; J. Bythewood	Joe Bythewood	4:09
14.	"Small Time" (featuring Ghetto Twiinz)	B. Jordan; L. Edwards; T. Jupiter	Mike Dean; Precise	3:57
15.	"Krunch Time" (featuring K.B.)	B. Jordan; K. Brown	Mike Dean	3:59

Disc 2
No.	Title	Writer(s)	Producer(s)	Length
1.	"City Under Siege" (featuring Facemob)	B. Jordan; H. Armstrong; J. Dorcy; K. Brown	Mr. Lee	3:25
2.	"Do What You Want" (featuring Devin the Dude)	B. Jordan; D. Copeland; J. Hearne	N.O. Joe; Jo Jo	4:27
3.	"Dog These Ho's" (featuring E-Rock and C-Note)	B. Jordan; C. Smith; E. Taylor	Scarface; Mr. Lee	3:45
4.	"Boo Boo'n" (featuring Devin the Dude)	B. Jordan; D. Copeland; M. Poye	Domo	4:35
5.	"You Owe Me" (featuring Facemob)	B. Jordan; D. Copeland; H. Armstrong; J. Dorcy; K. Brown	Mr. Lee	3:16
6.	"In My Blood" (featuring Big Mike, DMG, and Yukmouth)	B. Jordan; H. Armstrong; J. Ellis; M. Barnett	Mike Dean	5:00
7.	"Sleepin' In My Nikes" (featuring Seagram)	B. Jordan; S. Miller	Mike Dean	4:24
8.	"Greed"	B. Jordan; J. Hearne	N.O. Joe; Jo Jo	4:15
9.	"Who Run This" (featuring 007)	B. Jordan; A. Barnes	Scarface; Mike Dean	4:46
10.	"Cocaine" (featuring A-G-2-A-Ke)	B. Jordan; G. Talley; K. Kinlow	88 Keys	3:59
11.	"All Night Long" (featuring F.L.A.J.)	B. Jordan; D. Hunter; D. Porter; G. Hunter; R. Buttrill	Scarface	4:36
12.	"Use These Ho's" (featuring Devin the Dude and K.B.)	B. Jordan; D. Copeland; K. Brown; M. Poye	Domo	4:35
13.	"Menace Niggas Never Die" (featuring Menace Clan and Caine)	B. Jordan; D. Miller; W. Adams	Mr. Lee	3:43
14.	"Homies & Thuggs (The Original)" (featuring Master P and 2Pac)	B. Jordan; P. Miller; T. Shakur	N.O. Joe; Mike Dean	5:34
15.	"Warriors" (featuring Rag Tag)	B. Jordan; B. Coronado; C. Stevens; M. Weatherly; P. Martinez; T. Henderson	Rag Tag	7:10

== Charts ==
=== Weekly charts ===
Chart (1998)	Peak position
US Billboard 200	4
US Top R&B/Hip-Hop Albums (Billboard)	1

=== Year-end charts ===
Chart (1998)	Position
US Billboard 200	146
US Top R&B/Hip-Hop Albums (Billboard)	23

== Certifications ==
Region	Certification	Certified units/sales
United States (RIAA)	Platinum	1,000,000^{^}
^{^} Shipments figures based on certification alone.

== See also ==
- List of number-one R&B albums of 1998 (U.S.)
