= Boeing Center at Tech Port =

Indoor arena and convention center located in San Antonio

- Interactive map of Boeing Center at Tech Port
- Former names: Tech Port Center + Arena (2022-2023)
- Address: 3331 General Hudnell Drive
- Location: 29°22′53″N 98°33′55″W
- Owner: Port San Antonio
- Operator: ASM Global
- Capacity: 3,100

Construction
- Opened: May 2, 2022
- Cost: $70 million

Website
- boeingcentertechport.com

The Boeing Center at Tech Port, formerly Tech Port Center + Arena, is a 130,000-square-foot innovation center located in San Antonio, Texas at the campus of Port San Antonio. The venue hosts concerts, conventions, educational activities and esports competitions, among other events. The venue also features a state-of-the-art arena with a capacity to host 3,100 guests, an R&D tech collaboration space, a technology museum/showroom, LAN gaming center, meeting space and a full-scale food hall.

== History ==
On February 26, 2019, Port San Antonio announced their plans to construct an innovation center which would host various eSports and various entertainment events. The venue opened on May 2, 2022 with the first events being a Smashing Pumpkins concert on opening day and an Overwatch League match between the Dallas Fuel and Houston Outlaws on May 6. In the fall of 2022, the venue provided expansion space for the San Antonio Museum of Science and Technology. In January 2023, the facility was renamed the Boeing Center at Tech Port following a $2.3 million investment and seven-year naming rights deal with The Boeing Company.

On September 19, 2025, San Antonio Museum of Science and Technology founder and entrepreneur, David Monroe, was killed after suffering blunt force injuries from a jet engine that had fell on him when the jet engine was being transported inside the building.

== Notable events ==
- From May 24 to 29, 2022, the venue hosted the inaugural ForceCon, a military-industry-tech convention which also hosted several eSports events between the eSports teams of the various branches of the United States Armed Forces.
- From February 23 to 24, 2024, Psychopathic Records, a record label owned by the horrorcore hip-hop duo, the Insane Clown Posse, held their annual Juggalo Weekend event at the venue which featured various music performances from the Insane Clown Posse themselves, Ouija Macc, Layzie Bone, the Kottonmouth Kings, Krizz Kaliko, Acetone, Mr. Sadistic, Darby O' Trill, Shade, and Forilla along with professional wrestling matches from Juggalo Championship Wrestling (JCW).
- On September 13, 2024, Total Nonstop Action Wrestling (TNA) hosted their Victory Road TNA+ livestreaming event at the venue, which featured Nic Nemeth defending the TNA World Championship against Moose. Its weekly show Impact! also held tapings at the venue on January 23 and 24, 2025 and on September 24 and 25, 2026.
- On November 18, 2025, Texas governor Greg Abbott spoke at a Texas Association of Business one-day business and policy summit ahead of his mid-term election.
- On December 6, 2025, WWE hosted its NXT Deadline premium live event at the venue in which the main event match was an Iron Survivor Challenge for an NXT Championship match between Je'Von Evans, Leon Slater, Joe Hendry, Dion Lennox, and Myles Borne.
