= Reality Check (Seagram album) =

Studio album by Seagram
- Released: May 31, 1994
- Recorded: 1993–1994
- Genre: Gangsta rap, G-funk, West Coast hip hop
- Label: Rap-A-Lot, Priority
- Producer: Jeff Gray, J. Prince (exec.), Seagram (exec.), Troy White

Seagram chronology
The Dark Roads (1992)	Reality Check (1994)	Souls on Ice (1997)

Reality Check is the second studio album by American rapper Seagram, released on May 31, 1994, via Rap-A-Lot Records and Priority Records. The album was produced by Jeff Gray, Seagram and Troy White. It was Seagram's last album during his lifetime. It peaked at number 53 on the Billboard Top R&B/Hip-Hop Albums chart and number 31 on the Top Heatseekers chart.

== Track listing ==
1. "The Town" (featuring Gangsta P, Angie & Y-D) - 4:55
2. "Gangsta Livin" - 4:19
3. "It Don't Stop" (featuring Gangsta P) - 3:42
4. "Can't Win for Losin" - 4:38
5. "Bustas, Tricks & Thangs" - 2:07
6. "Birth" - 5:26
7. "Where Do We Go From Here" - 4:31
8. "Eastside" - 3:28
9. "13 Deep" (featuring Gangsta P) - 4:40
10. "No Matter the Cost" - 6:02
11. "Gangstas & Players" (featuring Too Short) - 5:05
12. "The Old School" - 4:37
13. "69" - 3:12
14. "Peace to You" (featuring Down by Law) - 3:41

== Samples ==
Birth

- "For the Love of You" by The Isley Brothers

The Old School

- "Love T.K.O." by Teddy Pendergrass

The Town

- "Haboglabotribin'" by Bernard Wright

== Chart history ==
Chart (1994)	Peak position
U.S. Top Heatseekers (Billboard)	31
U.S. Top R&B/Hip-Hop Albums (Billboard)	53
