= Interview with a Killa =

Studio album by Ganksta NIP
- Released: June 30, 1998
- Studios: Work Camp Studio (Houston, TX)
- Genres: Horrorcore; gangsta rap
- Length: 1:03:00
- Label: Rap-A-Lot
- Producers: J.B. Money; Lakewood

Ganksta NIP chronology
Psychotic Genius (1996)	Interview with a Killa (1998)	Psycho Thug (1999)

Professional ratings
Review scores
Source	Rating
AllMusic	4/5 stars
XXL	S (1/5)

Interview with a Killa is the fourth solo studio album by American rapper Ganksta N-I-P. It was released on June 30, 1998, through Rap-A-Lot Records, marking his final album for the label. Recording sessions took place at Work Camp Studio in Houston. Production was handled by JB Money and Lakewood. It features guest appearances from Tah-Tah and Teresa Keyes.

The album peaked at number 57 on the Top R&B/Hip-Hop Albums and number 34 on the Heatseekers Albums charts in the United States. The album sold 19,515 units up to the year 2005.

== Track listing ==
No.	Title	Writer(s)	Producer(s)	Length
1.	"Intro"	Rowdy Williams; M. Doucett	Lakewood	3:25
2.	"Psycho Club"	Williams; Doucett	Lakewood	3:34
3.	"Move Something"	Williams; Doucett	Lakewood	2:55
4.	"I Don't Know Why"	Williams; Joseph Bythewood	JB	3:14
5.	"Why the Psych. Can't Do It"	Williams; Bythewood	JB	3:54
6.	"Erotic" (featuring Tasha)	Williams; Doucett	Lakewood	3:47
7.	"Murda Rush"	Williams; Bythewood	JB	2:54
8.	"Video Games"	Williams; Bythewood	JB	3:39
9.	"2 Minutes to Kill"	Williams; Bythewood	JB	2:47
10.	"Psycho on the Loose"	Williams; Bythewood	JB	3:04
11.	"What Makes This Boy Tick" (featuring Teresa Keyes)	Williams; Bythewood	JB	4:06
12.	"Psych Zone"	Williams; Doucett	Lakewood	3:51
13.	"Psycho Funk"	Williams; Doucett	Lakewood	3:40
14.	"Sic"	Williams; Doucett	Lakewood	3:16
15.	"1st Nigga from South Park"	Williams; Bythewood	JB	3:12
16.	"Acid Heads"	Williams; Bythewood	JB	4:25
17.	"Texas Chain Saw"	Williams; Doucett	Lakewood	3:52
18.	"Outtro"	Williams; Doucett	Lakewood	3:25
Total length:				1:03:00

== Personnel ==
- Rowdy "Ganksta N-I-P" Williams – vocals
- Tasha a.k.a. Tah-Tah – vocals (track 6)
- Teresa Keyes – vocals (track 11)
- M. "Lakewood" Doucett – producer (tracks: 1–3, 6, 12–14, 17, 18), engineering
- Joseph "J.B. Money" Bythewood – producer (tracks: 4, 5, 7–11, 15, 16), engineering
- Leroy "Mr. Lee" Williams – mixing
- Mike Dean – mastering
- James "J. Prince" Smith – executive producer
- Tony "Big Chief" Randle – production supervisor
- Anzel Jennings – production coordinator
- Donavin "Kid Styles" Murray – photography

== Charts ==
Chart (1998)	Peak position
US Top R&B/Hip-Hop Albums (Billboard)	57
US Heatseekers Albums (Billboard)	34
