= Psychotic Genius =

Studio album by Ganksta NIP
- Released: February 20, 1996
- Recorded: 1995–1996
- Studio: Ultimate Sounds; Mike's House
- Genre: Hip-hop
- Length: 1:01:03
- Label: Noo Trybe; Rap-A-Lot
- Producer: Gregory Jackson; Mezeio Jackson; Mike B.; N.O. Joe; Swift

Ganksta NIP chronology
Psychic Thoughts (1993)	Psychotic Genius (1996)	Interview with a Killa (1998)

Professional ratings
Review scores
Source	Rating
AllMusic	3/5 stars
RapReviews	7.5/10

Psychotic Genius is the third studio album by American rapper Ganksta N-I-P. It was released on February 20, 1996, via Noo Trybe/Rap-A-Lot Records. Production was handled by Swift, Mike B., Gregory Jackson, Mezeio Jackson and N.O. Joe. It features a lone guest appearance from Point Blank.

The album debuted at number 32 on the Top R&B/Hip-Hop Albums and number 19 on the Heatseekers Albums charts in the United States.

== Track listing ==
No.	Title	Writer(s)	Producer(s)	Length
1.	"Uncle Sam"	Rowdy Williams; Jonathan Catalon	Swift	5:51
2.	"Psychotic Genius"	Williams; Michael Banks	Mike B.	4:25
3.	"Small Town Killas" (featuring Point Blank)	Williams; Reginald Gilland; Gregory Jackson	Gregory Jackson	5:58
4.	"Peep da Game"	Williams; Banks	Mike B.	5:32
5.	"Slaughterhouse"	Williams; Catalon	Swift	5:26
6.	"Goin to da Death"	Williams; Mezeio Jackson	Mezeio Jackson	4:59
7.	"Psychflow"	Williams; Catalon	Swift	3:47
8.	"Hood Talez"	Williams; Banks	Mike B.	4:16
9.	"Peace to da Young G's"	Williams; Catalon	Swift	5:24
10.	"Crime Wave"	Williams; G. Jackson	Gregory Jackson	5:10
11.	"Hollograms"	Williams; Joseph Johnson	N.O. Joe	4:55
12.	"Murda After Midnite"	Williams; G. Jackson	Gregory Jackson	5:20
Total length:				1:01:03

== Personnel ==
- Rowdy "Ganksta N-I-P" Williams – vocals
- Reginald "Point Blank" Gilland – vocals (track 3)
- John "Swift" Catalon – producer (tracks: 1, 5, 7, 9)
- Michael "Mike B." Banks – producer (tracks: 2, 4, 8)
- Gregory Jackson – producer (tracks: 3, 10, 12)
- Mezeio Jackson – producer (track 6)
- Joseph "N.O. Joe" Johnson – producer (track 11)
- Mike Dean – engineering, mixing, mastering
- Jeff Griffin – engineering assistant
- Anthony Valcic – mastering
- James "J Prince" Smith – executive producer
- Jason Clark – art direction
- Donavin "Kid Styles" Murray – illustration
- Mario Castellanos – photography

== Charts ==
Chart (1996)	Peak position
US Top R&B/Hip-Hop Albums (Billboard)	32
US Heatseekers Albums (Billboard)	19
