= Seagram (rapper) =

American rapper (1970–1996)

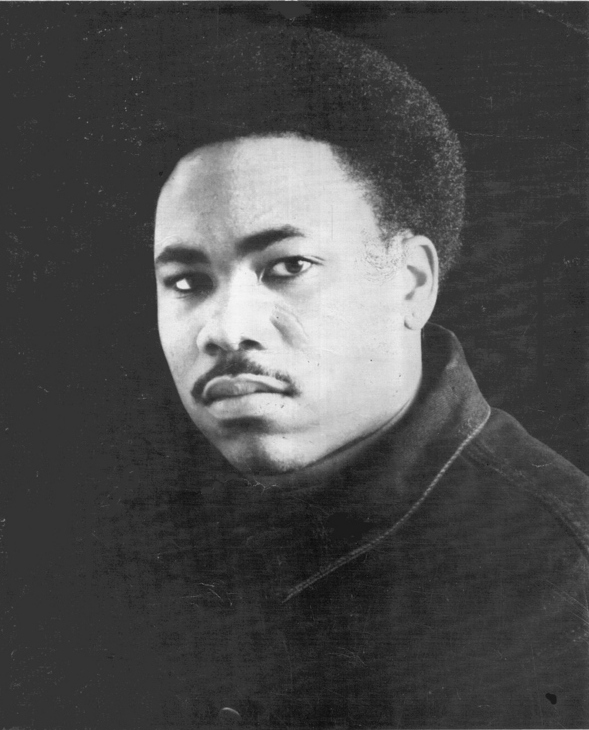

Background information
- Born: Seagram Miller; April 13, 1970
- Origin: Oakland, California, U.S.
- Died: July 31, 1996 (aged 26) Oakland, California, U.S.
- Occupation: Rapper
- Years active: 1989–1996
- Labels: Rap-A-Lot, Virgin

Seagram Miller (April 13, 1970 – July 31, 1996) was an American rapper from Oakland, California, United States.

Seagram released two albums, The Dark Roads (1992) and Reality Check (1994). He was killed in a drive-by shooting on July 31, 1996, which remains unsolved. He is interred in Oakland. A posthumous album, Souls on Ice, was released in 1997.

== Discography ==
=== Studio albums ===
- The Dark Roads (1992)
- Reality Check (1994)

=== Posthumous studio albums ===
- Souls on Ice (1997)
- Death of a Soldier (2024)

=== Compilation albums ===
- Greatest Hits (2009)
- Bay Business Soundtrack (2016)

=== Singles ===
- "The Vill" (from the album The Dark Roads) (1992)
- "The Dark Roads" (from the album The Dark Roads) (1992)
- "Eastside" (from the album Reality Check) (1994)
- "If the World Was Mine" (from the album Souls on Ice) (1997)

=== Guest appearances ===
Year	Album	Song
1992	Street Life	"Break Yourself" (Kool Rock Jay featuring Seagram)
1992	The South Park Psycho	"Action Speaks Louder Than Words" (Ganksta N-I-P featuring Scarface, Willie D & Seagram)
1993	Player's Choice	"Jack Mission" (Too Much Trouble featuring Seagram)
1993	Till Death Do Us Part	"Bring it On" (Geto Boys featuring Seagram, DMG, 3–2, Too Much Trouble, 5th Ward Boyz, Devin the Dude & Ganksta N-I-P)
1995	Bad N-Fluenz	"Dirty Work" (Rappin' Ron & Ant Diddley Dog featuring Mr. Ill, Seagram & Too Short)
1995	Sick-O	"Sick-O" (3X Krazy featuring Seagram & Gangsta P)
1996	Message to the Black Man	"3 Strikes" (Askari X featuring 3X Krazy, Bad N-Fluenz, Brotha Moe, The Delinquents, Mike Mike, Mr. Ill & Seagram)
1996	Cell Block Compilation	"Out to Be the Boss" (Seagram & Luniz)
1997	Stackin Chips	"Can't Fuck With This" (3X Krazy featuring Harm & Seagram)
1997	Put It Down	"5150" (Big Toine featuring Seagram & Yobe)
1997	State Vs. Pooh-Man Straight from San Quentin	"Don't Fuck Wit My Money" (Pooh-Man featuring Seagram & Big Mack)
1997	International Blunt Funk Compilation	"East Side Soldier" (Seagram, Yukmouth, Dru Down & Pooh-Man)
1997	Notorious: Pimps, Playa's & Hustlas Compilation	"Real Hoggs" (Seagram, 20 Sack & G-Nut)
1998	My Homies	"Sleepin' In My Nikes" (Seagram featuring Scarface)

== Videography ==
=== Music videos ===
- "The Vill" (from the album The Dark Roads) (1992)
- "The Dark Roads" (from the album The Dark Roads) (1992)
- "Eastside" (from the album Reality Check) (1994)
- "If the World Was Mine" (from the album Souls on Ice) (1997)

== See also ==
- List of murdered hip hop musicians
