= Psychic Thoughts =

Psychic Thoughts (Are What I Conceive?)

Studio album by Ganksta NIP
- Released: July 6, 1993
- Recorded: 1992–1993
- Studios: Jungle Style Studios (Houston, TX); Digital Services (Houston, TX)
- Genres: Horrorcore; gangsta rap; hardcore hip hop
- Label: Rap-A-Lot
- Producers: J. Prince (also exec.); Crazy C; Ganksta NIP; John Bido; K-Rino; Landmine Productions

Ganksta NIP chronology
The South Park Psycho (1992)	Psychic Thoughts (Are What I Conceive?) (1993)	Psychotic Genius (1996)

Professional ratings
Review scores
Source	Rating
AllMusic	3/5 stars

Psychic Thoughts (Are What I Conceive?) is the second studio album by American rapper Ganksta NIP. It was released on July 6, 1993, through Rap-A-Lot Records. Recording sessions took place at Jungle Style Studios and at Digital Services in Houston. Production was handled by Crazy C, John Bido, Landmine Productions, K-Rino, Ganksta NIP, and J. Prince, who also served as executive producer. It features guest appearances form Dope-E, K-Rino, Lez Moné and Point Blank. The album peaked at number 151 on the Billboard 200, number 30 on the Top R&B/Hip-Hop Albums and number 5 on the Top Heatseekers.

== Track listing ==
No.	Title	Length
1.	"SPC Shoutout"
2.	"Trance"
3.	"Psychic Thoughts"
4.	"Reporter from Hell"
5.	"Set up Bitches" (featuring Lez Moné)
6.	"Only Nip Can Do It"
7.	"Now Watch 'Em Drop"
8.	"Strictly for the Club"
9.	"Come into My World"
10.	"That's How It Is: Psychic, Pt. 2"
11.	"Fuck You" (featuring K-Rino, Dope-E, Point Blank)

== Personnel ==
- Rowdy "Ganksta NIP" Williams – main performer, producer
- Leslie "Lez Moné" Hall – featured performer (track 5)
- Eric "K-Rino" Kaiser – featured performer (track 11), producer
- Al-Khidr Zodoqyah Israel – featured performer (track 11), producer, mixing
- Reginald "Point Blank" Gilliand – featured performer (track 11)
- Simon "Crazy C" Cullins – producer, mixing
- John Okuribido – producer, mixing
- Egypt E – producer, mixing
- James A. Smith – producer, executive producer, project coordinator, management
- Mike Dean – engineering, mixing, mastering
- John Moran – mastering
- Troy "Pee Wee" Clark – engineering assistant
- Jungle Style Productions – engineering assistant
- Tony "Big Chief" Randle – project coordinator, management
- Leroy Robinson, Jr. – art direction, design
- In A Flash Photography – photography

== Charts ==
Chart (1993)	Peak position
US Billboard 200	151
US Top R&B/Hip-Hop Albums (Billboard)	30
US Heatseekers Albums (Billboard)	5
