= Souls on Ice =

Studio album by Seagram
- Released: August 12, 1997
- Recorded: 1996; Find-A-Way Studios (Alameda, California), The Enterprise (Burbank, California)
- Genres: Gangsta rap, G-funk, West Coast rap
- Label: Rap-A-Lot/Noo Trybe/Virgin/EMI Records
- Producers: J. Prince (exec.), Mike Dean, Terry T, Tone Capone

Seagram chronology
Reality Check (1994)	Souls on Ice (1997)

Souls on Ice is the third and final studio album by American rapper Seagram. It was released posthumously on August 12, 1997, by Rap-A-Lot/Noo Trybe Records, a year after Seagram's passing. Seagram was murdered by gunfire on July 31, 1996, while shielding his long-time friend and fellow rapper Gangsta P. The album features guest appearances by Spice 1, Yukmouth and Scarface.

The album was produced by Mike Dean, Terry T and Tone Capone. It peaked at number 66 on the Billboard Top R&B/Hip-Hop Albums chart and number 40 on Top Heatseekers.

Along with a single, a music video was produced for the song, "If the World Was Mine", although Seagram only appears briefly in it. The song "Sleepin In My Nikes" also appeared on the 1998 Scarface album My Homies.

== Critical reception ==
Professional ratings
Review scores
Source	Rating
The Source	3/5 stars

Souls on Ice received positive reviews upon its release. Akwanza Gleaves of Rap Pages wrote: "Souls on Ice gives uncompromising insight on the conditions of growing up poor in urban America and the activities some use as methods and means of survival." The Source's Spence Dookey called it an "often poignant piece of work", commending Seagram for his "gritty tales of the East O streets" and narratives unique to gangsta rap genre. The journalist criticized "unspectacular" production for its "dated-sounding synthesized keyboards". Carlos Nino, in a review for Vibe, also criticized the production. "The rapper's passion for his music is clear, but unfortunately, the album doesn't display the innovation or progression to match it," wrote the journalist.

== Track listing ==
1. "Sleepin In My Nikes" (featuring Scarface) – 4:27
2. "S.E.A.G." – 3:51
3. "Slingin The Yea" – 4:58
4. "If the World Was Mine" – 4:15
5. "Don't Stop" (featuring Spice 1) – 3:47
6. "Off the Hook" – 4:25
7. "One 2 the Two" – 4:10
8. "Like This Like That" – 4:09
9. "Flintstones" – 4:50
10. "S.E.A.G. & Yuk Is Ridin" (featuring Yukmouth) – 4:51
11. "Gotta Stay Down" – 4:47
12. "Straight Mobbin" – 4:03

== Charts ==
Chart (1997)	Peak position
U.S. Top Heatseekers (Billboard)	40
U.S. Top R&B/Hip-Hop Albums (Billboard)	66
