= Little Big Man (album) =

Studio album by Bushwick Bill
- Released: September 8, 1992
- Recorded: 1992
- Studios: Digital Services (Houston, Texas)
- Genre: Gangsta rap
- Length: 52:29
- Label: Rap-A-Lot
- Producers: J. Prince; John Bido; Crazy C (co.); Goldfinger (co.); Mike Dean (co.); Roland (co.)

Bushwick Bill chronology
Little Big Man (1992)	Phantom of the Rapra (1995)

Little Big Man is the debut solo studio album by American rapper Bushwick Bill, of the Geto Boys. It was released on September 8, 1992, through Rap-A-Lot Records. The recording sessions took place at Digital Services in Houston. The album was produced by John Bido and J. Prince, with co-producers Crazy C, Roland, Goldfingers, and Mike Dean. It features guest appearances from Ganksta NIP and MC L.

The album peaked at number 32 on the Billboard 200 and number 15 on the Top R&B/Hip-Hop Albums chart in the United States.

== Critical reception ==
Professional ratings
Review scores
Source	Rating
AllMusic	3/5 stars
Robert Christgau	C+
Los Angeles Times	1.5/4 stars

The Los Angeles Times concluded that "some poignant confessions, catchy beats and fierce rapping don't compensate for the steady stream of unsavory, humorless venom."

== Track listing ==
No.	Title	Length
1.	"Intro"	3:19
2.	"Little Big Man"	3:34
3.	"Stop Lying"	3:55
4.	"Call Me Crazy"	4:32
5.	"Chuckwick" (featuring Ganksta NIP)	4:56
6.	"Don't Come to Big"	3:19
7.	"Ever So Clear"	5:58
8.	"Copper to Cash"	4:27
9.	"Dollars and Sense"	4:16
10.	"Letter from KKK"	4:20
11.	"Take Em' Off" (featuring MC L)	4:45
12.	"Skitso"	5:00
Total length:		52:29

== Personnel ==
- Richard Stephen Shaw – main artist
- Rowdy Williams – featured artist (track 5)
- Linc "MC L" Vanderhorst – featured artist (track 11)
- John Okuribido – producer, mixing, mastering
- James H. Smith – producer
- Michael George Dean – co-producer, engineering, mastering
- Simon Cullins – co-producer, mixing
- Roland Smith Jr. – co-producer
- Victor "Goldfingers" Diaz – co-producer
- Roger Tausz – mastering
- Donavin "Kid Styles" Murray – cover illustration
- J. Patrick Smith – design
- Shawn Brauch – design
- Okee Stewart – photography
- Pen and Pixel Graphics – layout

== Charts ==
Chart (1992)	Peak position
US Billboard 200	32
US Top R&B/Hip-Hop Albums (Billboard)	15
