= Still Psycho =

Studio album by Ganxsta N.I.P
- Released: November 29, 2008
- Recorded: 2007–2008
- Genres: Horrorcore; gangsta rap; hardcore hip hop
- Label: Psycho Ward Entertainment
- Producers: X-Productions; Mike B; Candyman; Jerry X

Ganxsta N.I.P chronology
The Return of the Psychopath (2003)	Still Psycho (2008)	Psych' Swag: Da Horror Movie (2010)

Still Psycho is the seventh album released by rapper Ganxsta N.I.P. It was released in 2008 by his own label, Psycho Ward Entertainment. The album was released after five years after his last album "The Return of the Psychopath". The only guest on the album is K-Rino. Producers on the album are X-Productions, Mike B, Candyman, Jerry X.

== Track listing ==
1. "We Can Rebuild Ganxsta Nip"- 4:53
  - Producer - Mike B
2. "Brought Me Back from da Dead!"- 3:41
  - Producer - Candyman
3. "Nip Is Back!!!"- 3:15
  - Producer - Mike B*
4. "Nip-U-Later"- 4:27
5. "Blood Thirsty"- 3:13
6. "Down South"- 3:35
7. "Still Psycho"- 3:21
8. "Bob Ya Head"- 3:06
9. "Go Crazy"- 3:27
10. "Fuck Dem Cops!"- 4:22
11. "Take Over"- 4:40 (Featuring K-Rino)
12. "Real Talk"- 3:19
13. "Conversation with the Reaper"- 3:50
  - Producer - Candyman (9)
14. "Streets of South Park"- 3:14
  - Producer - Jerry X
15. "Outro"- 1:15

== Personnel ==
Engineer - J-Blast

Mixed By - J-Blast

Photography - Peter Beste

Producer - X-Production* (tracks: 4 to 12)

Written-By - Ganxsta N.I.P
