= Ganksta N-I-P =

American rapper

Ganxsta NIP
- Also known as: Ganksta NIP; Psycho N.I.P.; Ganxsta NIP; Brother N.I.P.
- Born: Rowdy Lewayne Williams; August 28, 1969 (age 57)
- Origin: South Park, Houston, Texas, United States of America
- Genres: Gangsta rap; horrorcore; hardcore hip hop
- Occupation: Rapper
- Years active: 1986–present
- Labels: Rap-a-Lot; Happy Alone; Rest In Peace; Blackmarket; Psych Ward

Rowdy Lewayne Williams (born August 28, 1969), better known as Ganxsta NIP (pronounced Gangsta Nip), is an American rapper from South Park, Houston, Texas and a member of the South Park Coalition, which he co-founded in 1987 with Houston rapper K-Rino. In 1992 he released his debut album South Park Psycho. This record also helped put the South Park Coalition name on the map due to world wide distribution from Rap-a-Lot. He also wrote the Geto Boys hit "Chuckie". NIP stands for "Nation of Islam Is Powerful"; he is also a part of the Nation of Islam. Williams is also looked at as one of the creators of the horrorcore rap genre.

== Biography ==
Ganxsta NIP's first album The South Park Psycho was released in 1992. There was no single to promote the album but it charted at #63 on the Top R&B/Hip-Hop Albums and sold almost 100,000 copies in the area to land him a deal with Priority Records. His second solo album Psychic Thoughts (Are What I Conceive) charted on the Billboard 200 at #151, at #30 on the Top R&B/Hip-Hop Albums and at #5 on the Top Heatseekers. His style of rap was hardcore gangsta rap with gory lyrical content, which is called horrorcore.

After his 2003 album The Return!!! (of the Psychopath) NIP took a break before making a comeback with Still Psycho five years later. Ganxsta NIP’s most recent album, Psych' Swag: Da Horror Movie, consists of 14 songs and was released on the artist's own record label Psych Ward Entertainment.

== Discography ==
=== Studio albums ===
- 1992: The South Park Psycho
- 1993: Psychic Thoughts (Are What I Conceive?)
- 1996: Psychotic Genius
- 1998: Interview with a Killa
- 1999: Psycho Thug
- 2003: The Return!!! (of the Psychopath)
- 2008: Still Psycho
- 2010: Psych' Swag: Da Horror Movie
- 2012: H-Town Legend: Still Gettin It In
- 2014: God of Horrorcore Rap
- 2016: Street Messiah (as Brother N.I.P)
- 2017: Souljaz Only (as Brother NIP)
- 2018: Creator of Horrorcore
- 2019: Conversation with the Gangstas (as Brother NIP)
- 2020: The Great Adventures of NIP Turner (as Brother NIP)
- 2023: Street Messiah 2 (Da 2nd Coming) (as Brother NIP)
- 2025: South Park Psycho 2: Back to the Beginning

=== Other albums ===
- 2003: Originator of the Psycho Sound

=== With South Park Coalition ===
- 2003: Packin' Heat
- 2004: Family Bizness
- 2006: Personal Vendetta

=== Guest appearances ===
Year	Artist(s)	Title	Album
1991	Bushwick Bill	"Chuckwick"	Little Big Man
1993	Seagram (Featuring Bushwick Bill & Ganksta N-I-P)	"Wages Of Sin"	The Dark Roads
1993	Geto Boys (Featuring 2-Low, Seagram, Too Much Trouble, 007, E-Rock, Devin the Dude, Jugg Mugg, Ganksta N-I-P, DMG, 3-2, Big Mello)	"Bring It On"	Till Death Do Us Part
1995	K-Rino	"Do Or Die"	Danger Zone
2003	Murder One	"For The Haters Part 1"	Rhythm For Thugs
2006	Mars	"Red Planet"	Mars Attacks
2006	Mars	"White Noise"	Mars Attacks
2007	K-Rino	"Bussin Rounds"	A Lyrical Legend
