= The Fillmore Detroit =

Multi-use entertainment venue in Detroit

Coordinates: 42°20′15″N 83°3′7″W

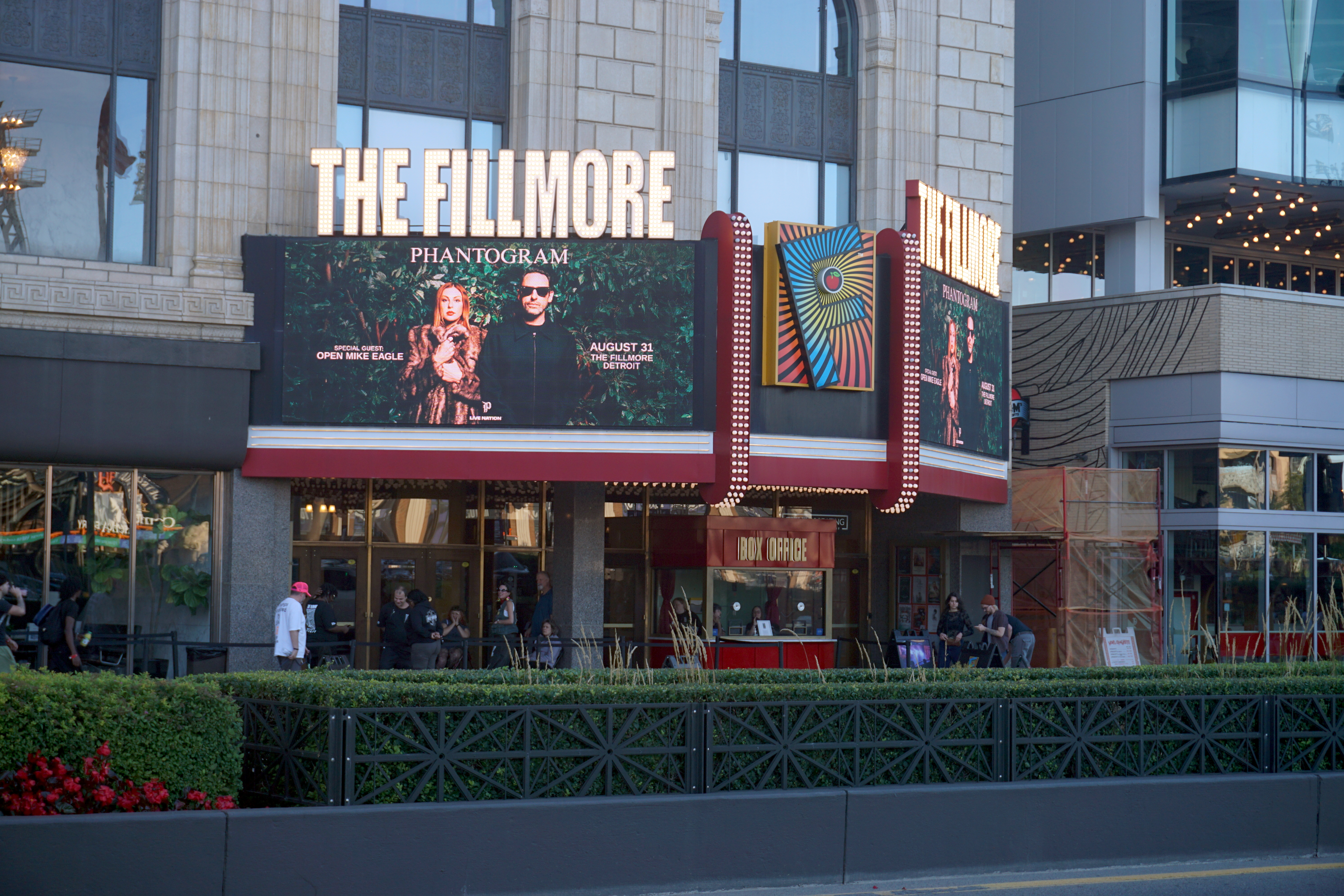
- Exterior view of the venue (2025)
- Interactive map of The Fillmore Detroit
- Former names: State Theatre (1925-37; 1982-89; 1991-2007); Palms Theatre (1937-82); Clubland (1989-91)
- Address: 2115 Woodward Ave; Detroit, MI 48201-3469
- Owner: Jim Forbes
- Operator: Live Nation
- Capacity: 2,900
- Public transit: Grand Circus Park; Montcalm Street; SMART FAST Woodward 461, 462; DDOT 4 D2A2

Construction
- Opened: October 29, 1925
- Renovated: 2007, 2018
- Reopened: June 13, 2007

Website
- Venue Website
- Francis Palms Building & State Theater
- U.S. National Register of Historic Places
- Architect: C. Howard Crane
- Architectural style: Beaux Arts
- NRHP reference No.: 82000551
- Added to NRHP: November 24, 1982

The Fillmore Detroit is a multi-use entertainment venue operated by Live Nation. Built in 1925, the Fillmore Detroit was known for most of its history as the State Theatre. It is located near the larger Fox Theatre in the Detroit Theatre District along Woodward Avenue across from Comerica Park and Grand Circus Park.

The Fillmore Detroit features a theatre with a Grand Lobby and three levels of seating, as well as the State Bar & Grill which has a separate entrance and is open when the theatre is not hosting events. In April, The Detroit Music Awards are held annually at The Fillmore Detroit. The building was listed on the National Register of Historic Places in 1982.

== History ==
The site of the Fillmore was previously home to an earlier theatre known as the Central and then, from 1913-1923, as the Grand Circus Theatre. This theatre was demolished to make way for the 1925 construction of what was then called the Francis Palms Building. The building was named for Francis Palms, a First French Empire native who moved to Detroit in 1832 and made his fortune in real estate development. Palms' descendants continued in real estate as the Palms Realty Company, and constructed this building at a time when Detroit's population and the popularity of movies was booming.

The theatre was constructed in 1925 as a movie house in the Renaissance Revival style of architecture. C. Howard Crane was the original architect, and the building is still called the Francis Palms Building.

The theatre was originally called the State Theatre when it opened in 1925. It was renamed the Palms-State Theatre in 1937 and the Palms Theatre in 1946. In 1982 it was renamed back to the State Theatre. And in 2007 (as a national re-branding) it was renamed, this time the Fillmore Theatre.

The building is twelve stories high and covered with terra cotta, with an eight-story auditorium extending to the rear of the building. The office tower has elaborate Beaux-Arts Italian Renaissance decorations on all but the ground floor, which was modernized in about 1960.

== Current use ==
The Fillmore Detroit is a concert venue for popular music acts as well as hosting many special events. The venue's current seating capacity is 2,900, 2,084 for reserved seating. The mezzanine and balcony levels still contain their original theatre seating.

In March 2007, Live Nation announced that the State Theatre would become the Fillmore Detroit as part of a multi-city extension of the Fillmore brand, similar to what has been done previously with the House of Blues franchise. Various changes were implemented to evoke the Fillmore's iconic venue in San Francisco, California. The official inaugural show under the Fillmore Detroit re-branding was Fergie's June 13, 2007, performance.

Live Nation has continued the gradual restoration of the Italian Renaissance theatre. The outer lobby and rotunda lobby were restored in the 1990s. The grand foyer columns and auditorium proscenium arch were more recent restorations. Live Nation has restored the barrel vaulted ceiling of the three-story grand foyer, and has plans to work on the upper reaches of the auditorium in increments.

== American Idol ==
In 2015, the fourteenth season of American Idol held semi-finals at The Fillmore Detroit. Pre-recorded episodes were aired on Fox starting on February 25, followed by two live episodes, the series' first broadcast from outside Los Angeles, on March 3 and 4.

== Gallery ==
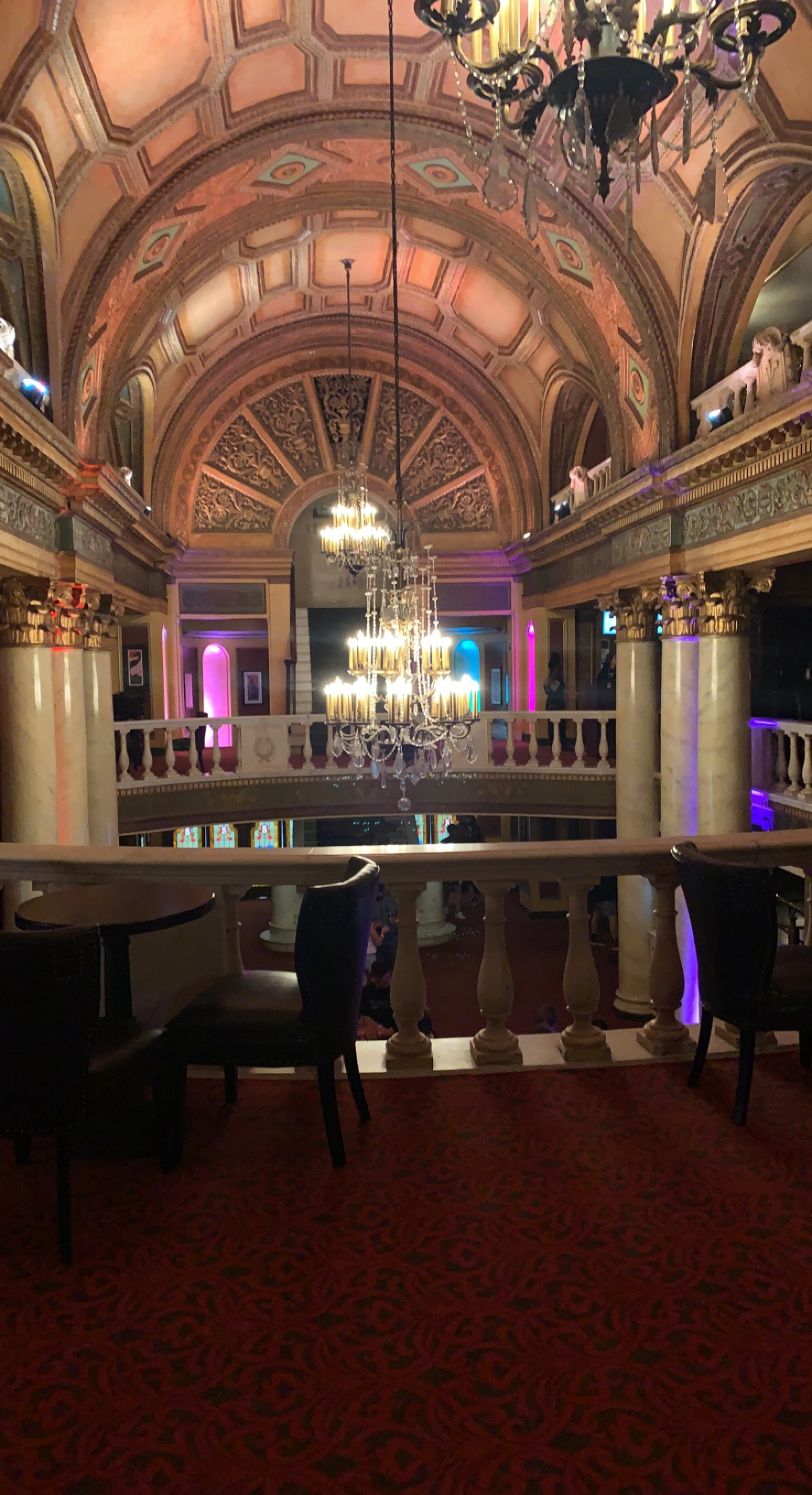
the Fillmore from the second floor balcony.

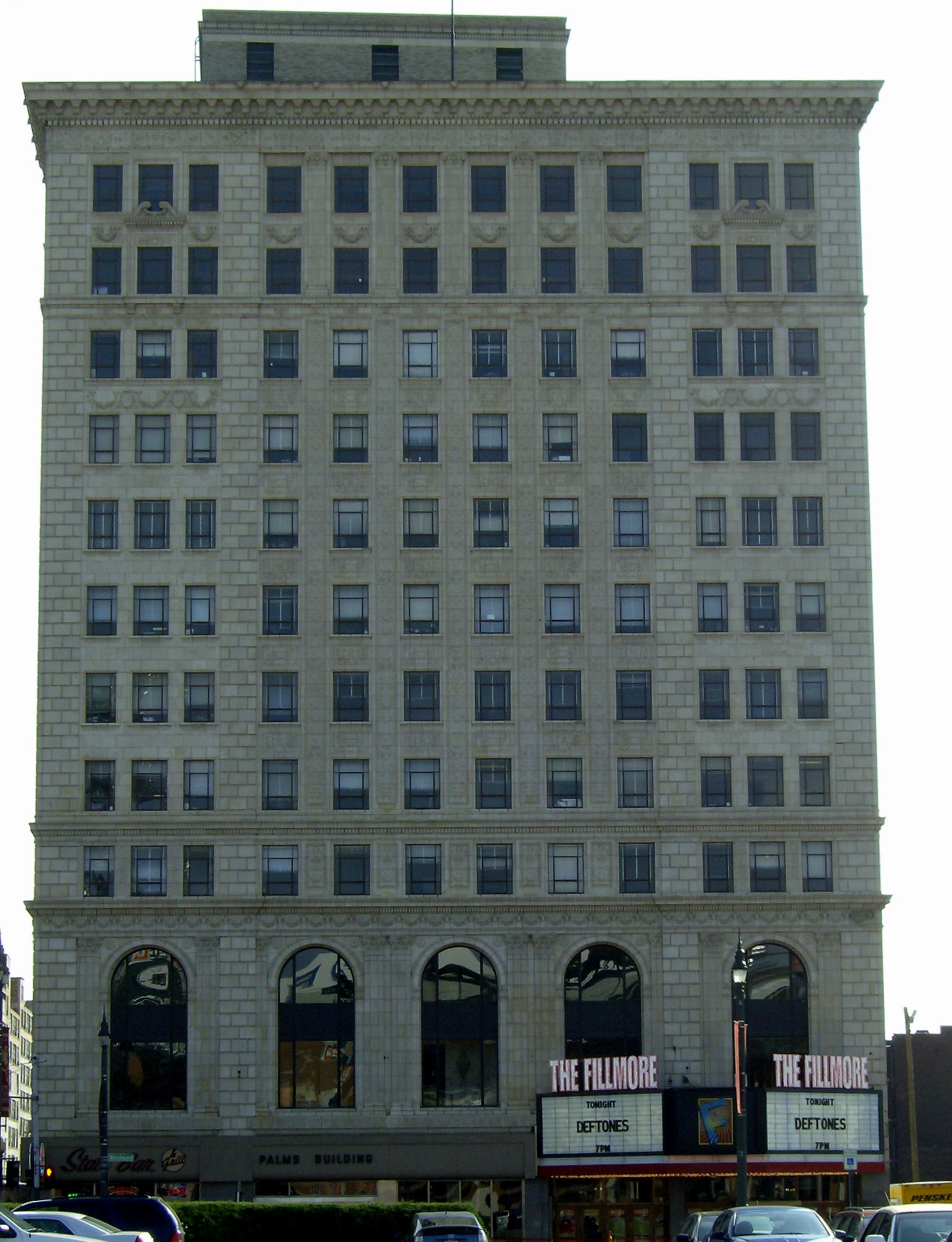
The Palms Building houses the Fillmore Detroit theatre

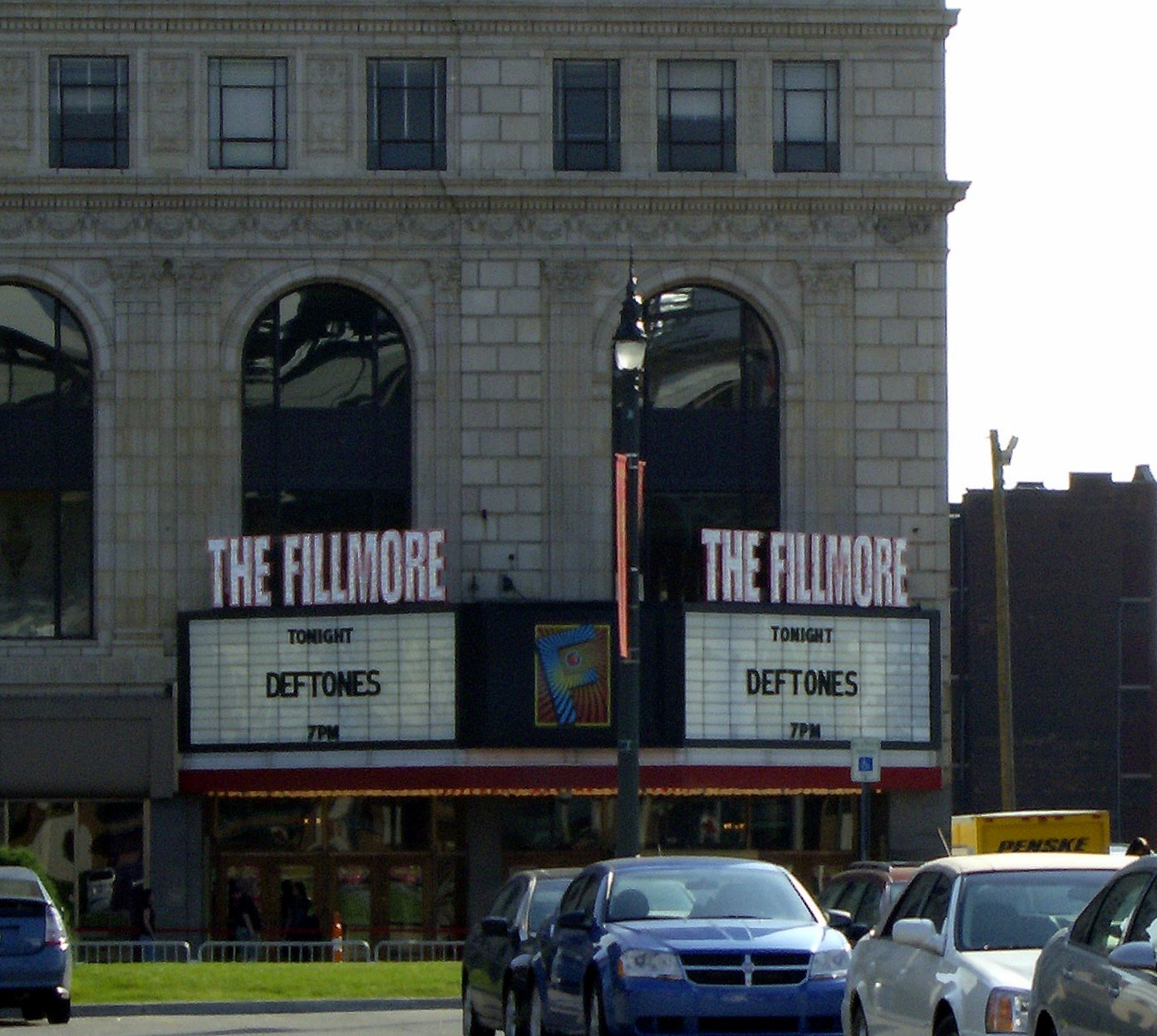
The marquee extends over Woodward Avenue

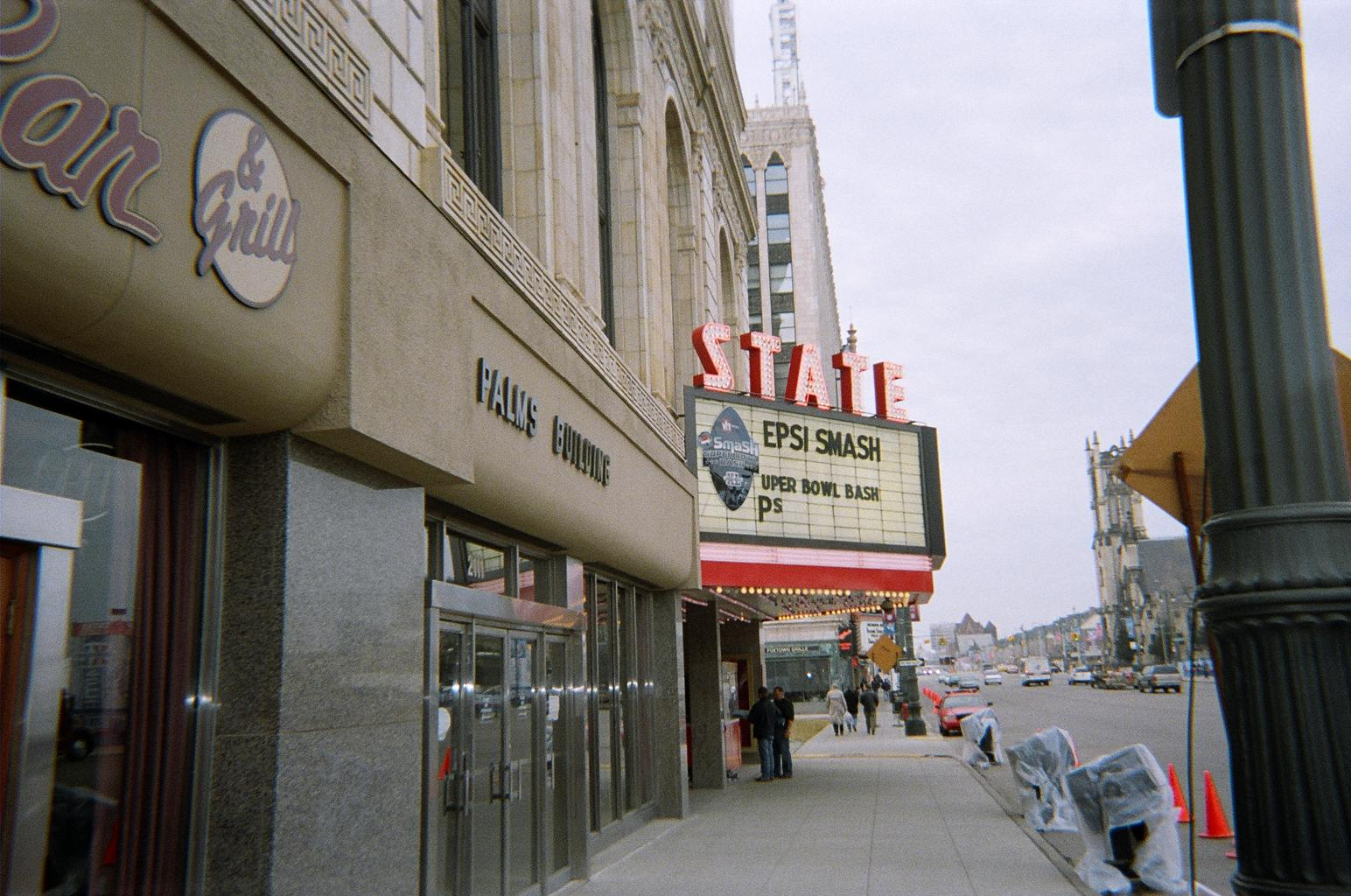
The Fillmore Detroit was known for most of its history as the State Theatre

== See also ==
- Fox Theatre
- House Of Blues
