= Majestic Theatre (Detroit) =

- The Majestic Theatre
- U.S. National Register of Historic Places
- Michigan State Historic Site
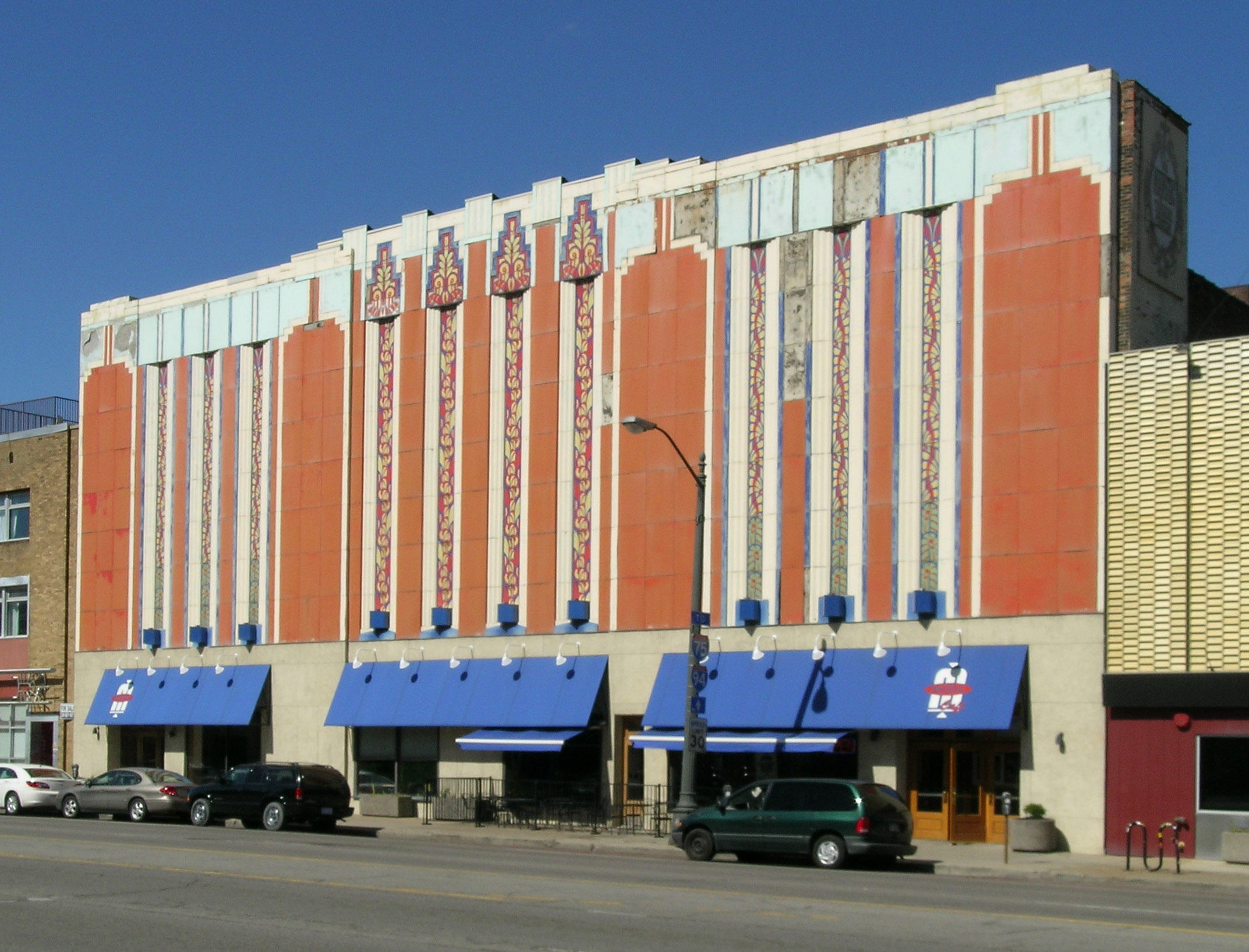
- Majestic Theatre in 2008
- Michigan
- Interactive map
- Location: 4120-4140 Woodward Avenue; Detroit, Michigan
- Nearest city: Woodward Avenue
- Coordinates: 42°21′5″N 83°3′37″W
- Built: 1915
- Architect: C. Howard Crane; Bennett & Straight
- Architectural style: Art Deco
- Restored: 1984; 2018
- Restored by: Majestic Theatre Center
- Visitation: 1100 (2019–2021)
- Part of: Majestic Theatre Center (Majestic Theatres)
- NRHP reference No.: 08000577

Significant dates
- Added to NRHP: July 02, 2008
- Boundary increase: $1,000,000 (renovations)

The Majestic Theatre is a theatre located at 4126-4140 Woodward Avenue in Midtown Detroit, Michigan. It was listed on the National Register of Historic Places in 2008.

Today, the theatre is mainly a music venue. It hosts a variety of musical concerts in three separate areas of the building: The Majestic, The Majestic Cafe, and The Magic Stick.

== History ==
The Majestic Theatre, designed by C. Howard Crane, opened on April 1, 1915. The theatre originally seated 1,651 people (at the time the largest theatre in the world built for the purpose of showing movies), and the facade was designed in an arcaded Italian style. In 1934, the front 35 feet (11 m) of the theatre were removed when Woodward Avenue was widened to its present size. The entire facade was redesigned into its current striking Art Deco motif by the firm of Bennett & Straight. The theater now boasts the largest enameled metal panel Art Deco facade in the Detroit metropolitan region.

The theatre eventually closed, and the building was used as a church for a time, and later as a photographic studio. It lay vacant for ten years. The present owner purchased the building in 1984.

There is a myth that legendary magician Harry Houdini gave his last performance on stage here, on Halloween night 1926. In fact, Houdini last performed at the Garrick Theatre in Detroit and died a few days later of peritonitis at Detroit's Grace Hospital on October 31, 1926.

The Majestic Theatre was placed on the National Register of Historic Places in 2008. In 2018 the venue's owners announced a renovation plan and pledged to put $1,000,000 into the building. On October 25, 2019, The Majestic Theatre unveiled its new marquee facing Woodward Avenue.

== Current use ==
The Majestic Theatre operates as part of the Majestic Theatre Center, which includes the attached Garden Bowl bowling alley, The Majestic Cafe, The Magic Stick, and Sgt. Pepperoni's.
