= Detroit Masonic Temple =

Masonic building in Detroit, Michigan

Coordinates: 42°20′29″N 83°03′37″W

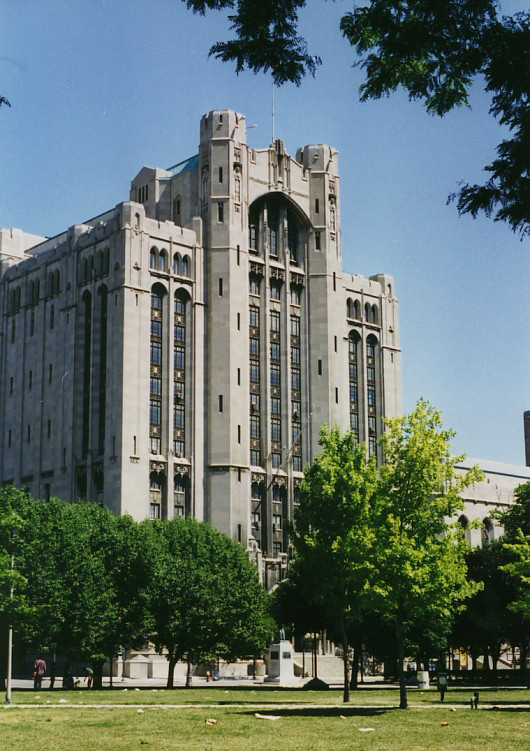
- Exterior view of the Ritualistic Tower seen from Cass Park (c. 2007)
- Interactive map of the Detroit Masonic Temple area

General information
- Architectural style: Gothic Revival
- Location: Cass Park Historic District, Midtown, 500 Temple St; Detroit, MI
- Groundbreaking: November 25, 1920
- Opened: February 22, 1926
- Inaugurated: November 25, 1926
- Cost: $6.5 million ($104 million in 2025 dollars)
- Owner: Detroit MTA, Detroit Lodge No. 2

Technical details
- Floor count: 14

Design and construction
- Architect: George D. Mason

Other information
- Seating capacity: 4,635 (Masonic Temple Theatre); 1,725 (Masonic Jack White Theatre); 1,080 (Fountain Ballroom); 550 (Crystal Ballroom); 400 (The Chapel)
- Number of rooms: 1,037

Website
- themasonic.com
- Detroit Masonic Temple
- U.S. National Register of Historic Places
- U.S. Historic district – Contributing property
- Michigan State Historic Site
- NRHP reference No.: 80001920
- MSHS No.: P25067

Significant dates
- Added to NRHP: November 11, 1980
- Designated MSHS: January 24, 1964

The Detroit Masonic Temple is the world's largest Masonic Temple. Located in the Cass Corridor neighborhood of Detroit, Michigan, at 500 Temple Street, the building serves as a home to various masonic organizations including the York Rite Sovereign College of North America. The building has been listed on the National Register of Historic Places since 1980.

The Detroit Masonic Temple contains a variety of public spaces, including three theaters, three ballrooms and banquet halls, and a 160-by-100-foot (49 m × 30 m) clear-span drill hall. Recreational facilities include a swimming pool, a handball court, a gymnasium, a bowling alley, and a pool hall. The building also features numerous lodge rooms, offices, and dining spaces.

Architect George D. Mason designed the whole structure as well as the Masonic Temple Theatre, a venue for concerts, Broadway shows, and other special events in the Detroit Theater District. It contains a 55-by-100-foot (17 m × 30 m) stage, one of the largest in the country.

The Detroit Masonic Temple was designed in the neo-gothic architectural style, using a great deal of limestone. The ritual building features 16 floors, stands 210 feet (64 m) tall, with 1,037 rooms. It dominates the skyline in an area known as Cass Corridor, across Temple Street from Cass Park, and Cass Technical High School. It is within walking distance of the Little Caesars Arena and the MotorCity Casino Hotel.

== History ==
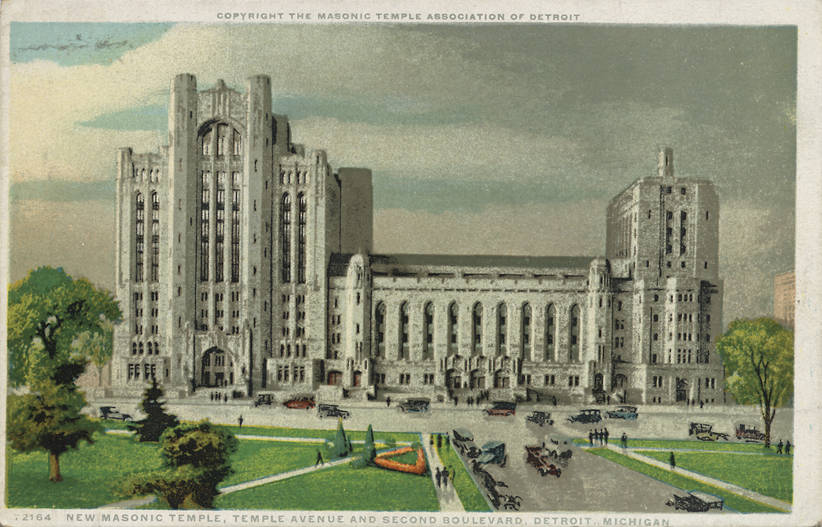
Masonic Temple, circa 1920s

The Masonic Temple Association was incorporated in Detroit in 1894. It moved into its first temple, on Lafayette Boulevard at First Street, in 1896. Outgrowing these quarters, the Association purchased land on Bagg Street (now Temple Avenue) to build a new temple that would also include a public theater. Fund-raising for construction of the building raised $2.5 million (equivalent to $40.18 million in 2025), and ground-breaking took place on Thanksgiving Day, 1920.

The cornerstone was placed on September 19, 1922, using the same trowel that George Washington had used to set the cornerstone of the United States Capitol in Washington D.C. The building was dedicated on Thanksgiving Day, 1926.

The original Masonic tenants following the dedication in 1926 included: Army & Navy Lodge No. 512, F&AM; Friendship Lodge No. 417, F&AM; Kilwinning Lodge No. 297, F&AM; Oriental Lodge No. 240, F&AM; Union Lodge of Strict Observance No. 3, F&AM; Zion Lodge No. 1, F&AM; and Monroe Chapter No. 1, RAM; Peninsular Chapter No. 16, RAM. The first lodge to be constituted, consecrated, and dedicated in the new Masonic Temple was Archives Lodge No. 456 on June 28, 1927, because it was the first to receive a dispensation on January 10, 1927.

The horseshoe-shaped auditorium originally had a capacity of 5,000. Due to poor sight lines along the sides of the stage, nearly 600 seats were removed (or never used), reducing maximum seating to 4,404.

It was listed on the National Register of Historic Places in 1980, and is part of the Cass Park Historic District, which was established in 2005.

In April 2013, the building was reported to be in foreclosure over $152,000 in back taxes owed to Wayne County. The debt was paid off in May 2013, and in June 2013, it was revealed that $142,000 of the bill was footed by singer-songwriter Jack White, a Detroit native known for his work with The White Stripes. He wanted to help the temple in its time of need as they had helped his mother in a time of need: the temple gave her a job as an usher in the theater when she was struggling to find work. In response, the Detroit Masonic Temple Association renamed its Scottish Rite cathedral the Jack White Theater. In April 2022, after performing, White proposed to his partner Olivia Jean at the temple and later married her.

== Architecture ==
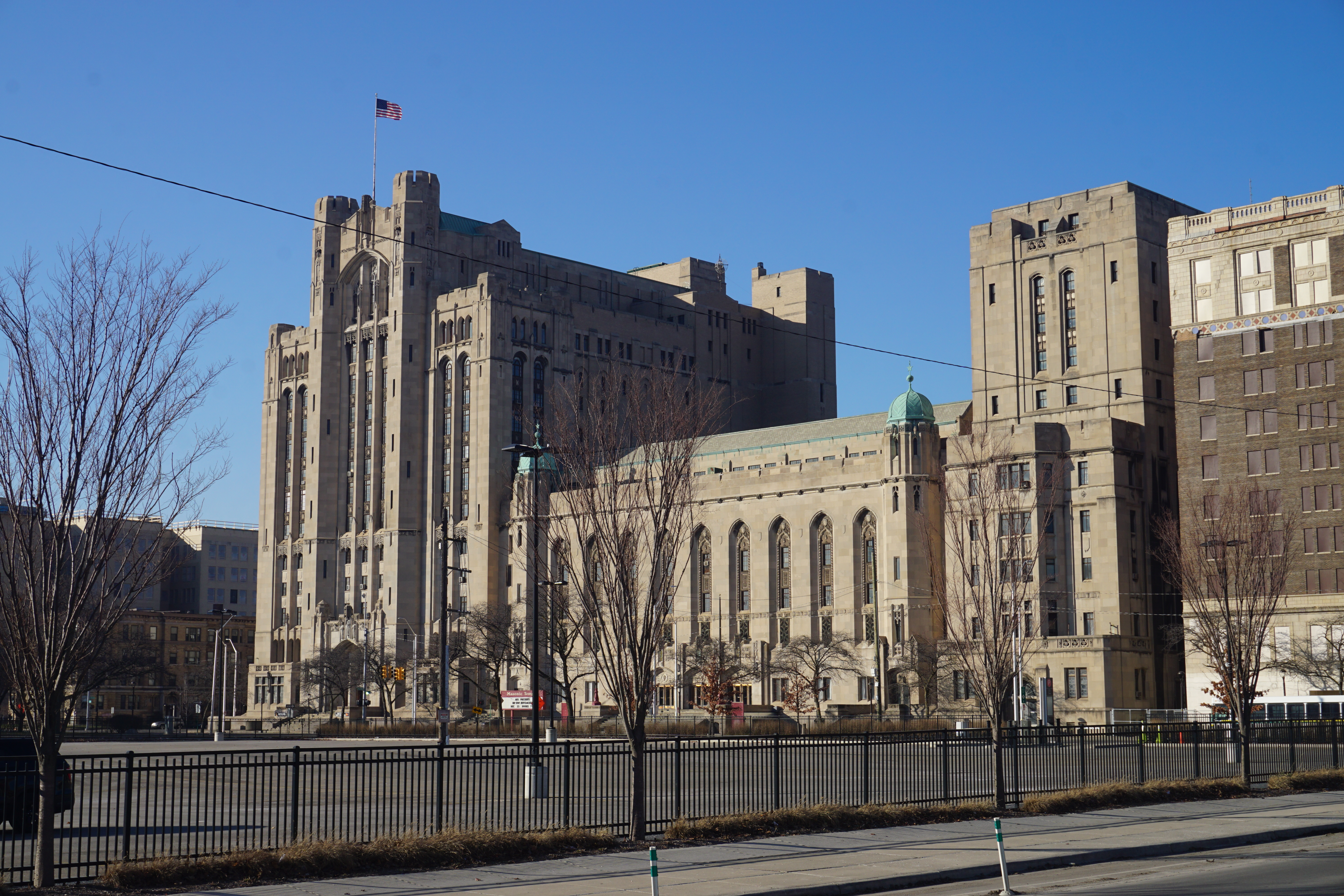
Masonic Temple, 2019

The Detroit Masonic Temple has been the largest Masonic Temple in the world since 1939, when the Chicago Masonic Temple was demolished. The stage of the auditorium is the second largest in the United States, having a width between walls of 100 feet (30 m) and a depth from the curtain line of 55 feet (17 m).

The large complex includes a 16-story 210-foot (64 m) ritual building connected to a 10-story wing for the Ancient Arabic Order of the Nobles of the Mystic Shrine, now known as Shriners International, by the 7-story Auditorium Building. In between these areas are a 1,586-seat Scottish Rite Cathedral, and a 17,500-square-foot (1,630 m^{2}) drill hall used for trade shows and conventions. The drill hall is also home to Detroit Roller Derby. The drill hall has a floating floor, where the entire floor is laid on felt cushions. This type of construction, also known as a sprung floor, provides 'give' to the floor which tends to relieve the marchers.

The building houses two ballrooms: the Crystal Ballroom; and the Fountain Ballroom, the latter of which measures 17,264 square feet (1,603.9 m^{2}) and accommodates up to 1,000 people. An unfinished theatre located in the top floor of the tower would have seated about 700.. Ford Motor Company founder Henry Ford would also visit the Masonic Temple for panoramic photographs on his 75th birthday on July 30, 1938.

Seven "Craft Lodge Rooms" all have different decorative treatments, the motifs of decoration being taken from the Egyptian, Doric, Ionic, Corinthian, Italian Renaissance, Byzantine, Gothic, and Romanesque styles. All of the artwork throughout the building, especially the decorated ceilings, was done under the direction of Italian artists. The building includes Royal Arch room, as well as a Commandery Asylum for the Knights Templar.

The Scottish Rite Cathedral has a seating capacity of 1600. Its stage is 64-feet (19.5 m) wide from wall to wall, with a depth of 37 feet (11 m) from the foot lights.

Architect George D. Mason designed the theatre, which contains a 55-foot-by-100-foot (17 x 30 m) stage. Detroit Masonic Temple was designed in the neo-gothic architectural style, and is faced with Indiana limestone. Although few Masonic buildings are in the Gothic style, the architect believed that Gothic best exemplified Masonic traditions.

Much of the stone, plaster, and metal work in the interior of the building was designed and executed by architectural sculptor Corrado Parducci. The three figures over the main entrance were by Leo Friedlander, while the rest of the considerable architectural sculpture on the exterior was by Bill Gehrke.

== Gallery ==
Architectural details

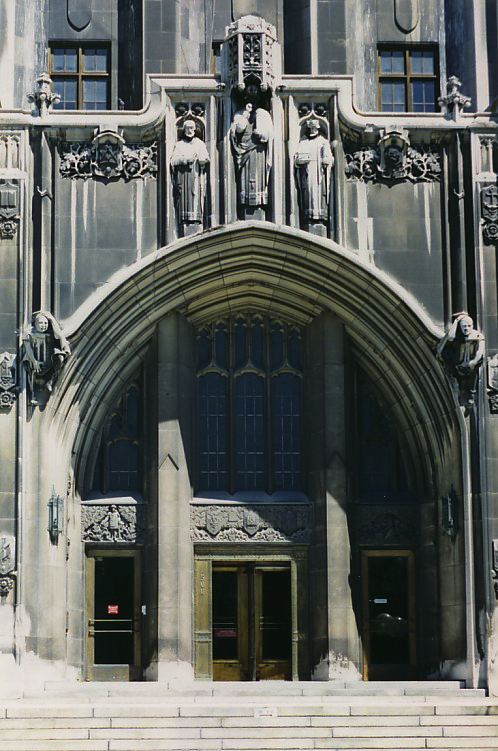

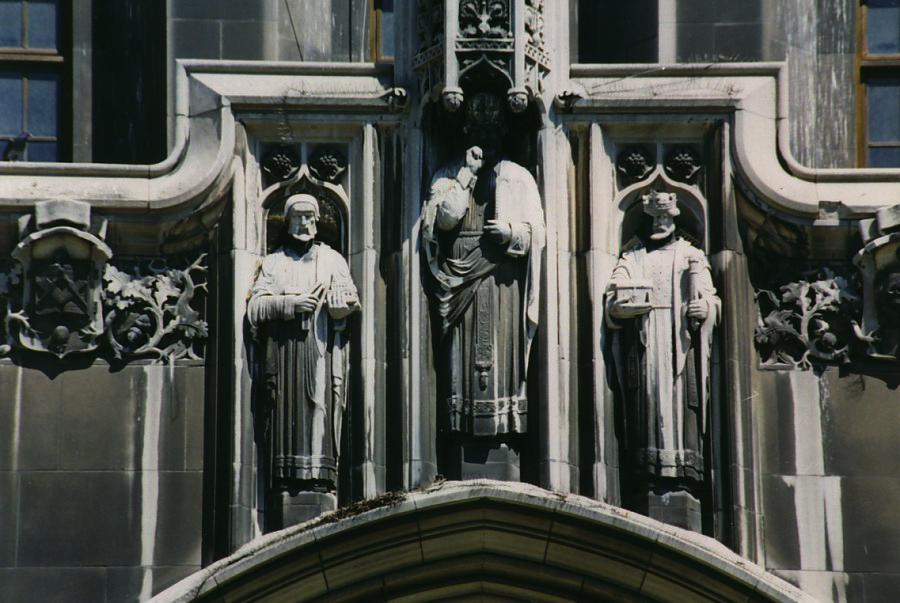

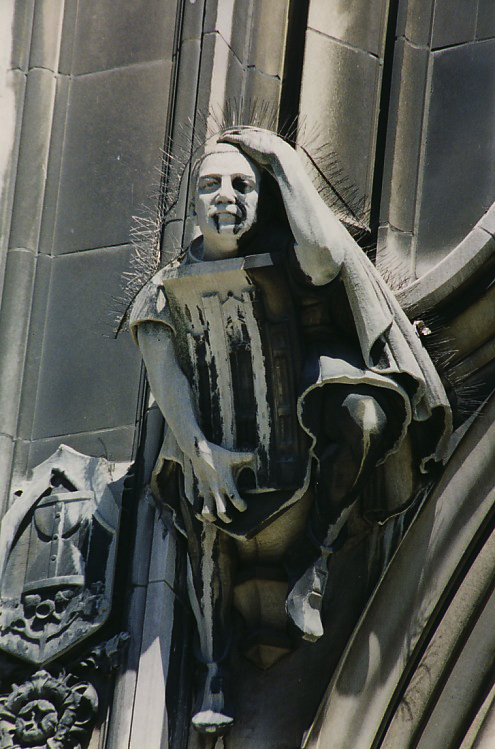

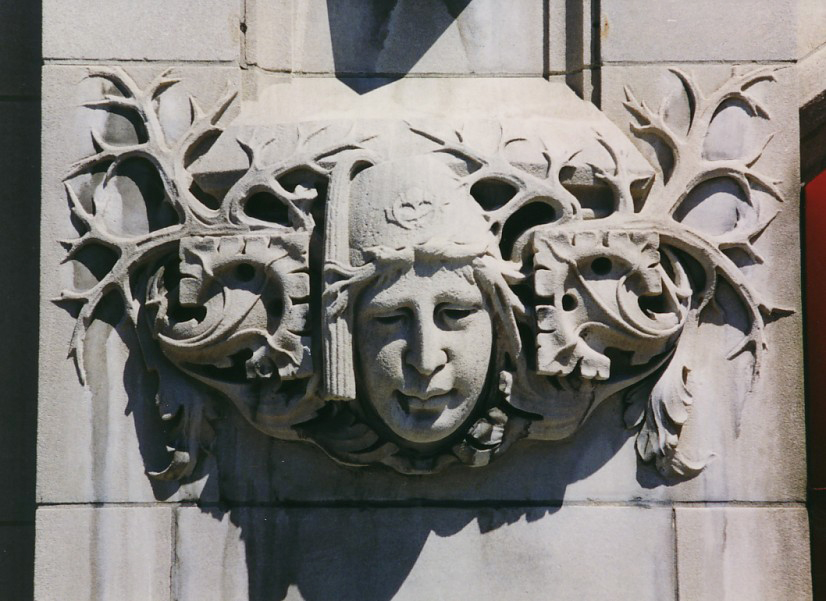

== Bibliography ==
- Hill, Eric J.; John Gallagher (2002). AIA Detroit: The American Institute of Architects Guide to Detroit Architecture. Wayne State University Press. ISBN 0-8143-3120-3.
- Kvaran, Einar Einarsson. Architectural Sculpture in America. unpublished.
- Lundberg, Alex; Greg Kowalski (2006). Detroit's Masonic Temple. Arcadia Publishing. ISBN 073854034X.
- Meyer, Katherine Mattingly and Martin C.P. McElroy with Introduction by W. Hawkins Ferry, Hon A.I.A. (1980). Detroit Architecture A.I.A. Guide Revised Edition. Wayne State University Press. ISBN 0-8143-1651-4.
- Masonic Temple Association of Detroit (1926). Masonic Temple: A.D. 1926, A.L. 5926. 32-page pamphlet. OCLC 23367822.
