= Esham discography =

- Studio albums: 21
- Extended plays: 9
- Compilation albums: 9
- Singles: 23
- Music videos: 50+
- Mixtapes: 6

Esham is an American rapper from Detroit currently signed to Reel Life Productions, a label he co-founded in 1989. His discography consists of 21 solo studio albums, eight studio albums as a member of NATAS, three as a member of Soopa Villainz where he is known as "Black Spade", and two as a member of 3 Headed Monster. His solo discography also includes multiple EPs, compilations, mixtapes, singles, and over 50 music videos.

Esham initially recorded and released the self-financed album Boomin' Words from Hell in 1989. After co-founding Reel Life Productions, Esham released three more albums independently: Judgement Day and KKKill the Fetus. His next album, Closed Casket, was distributed by Warlock Records.

In 1997, he began a production agreement with Overcore Records, which co-produced his discography with the re-branded Gothom Records until Overcore went defunct. Esham's Gothom/Overcore releases were distributed internationally by TVT Records. In 2002, Esham signed with Psychopathic Records, where he achieved his highest level of success and released his album with the most consecutive charts, A-1 Yola. He departed from Psychopathic afterwards and continued to release his music on Reel Life Productions.

== Albums ==
=== Studio albums ===
Title	Album details	Peak chart positions				
Title	Album details	US	US Heat	US Indie	US Rap	US R&B
Boomin' Words from Hell	Released: 1989; Label: Reel Life; Format: CD, LP, cassette, digital download	—	—	—	—	—
Judgement Day	Released: April 9, 1992; Label: Reel Life; Format: CD, LP, cassette, digital download	—	—	—	—	—
KKKill the Fetus	Released: June 16, 1993; Label: Reel Life; Format: CD, cassette, digital download	—	—	—	—	—
Closed Casket	Released: November 22, 1994; Label: Reel Life, Warlock; Format: CD, cassette, digital download	—	—	—	—	—
Dead Flowerz	Released: April 24, 1996; Label: Reel Life; Format: CD, LP, cassette, digital download	—	—	—	—	38
Bruce Wayne: Gothom City 1987	Released: June 1997; Label: Gothom, Overcore; Format: CD, cassette, digital download	—	—	—	—	57
Mail Dominance	Released: February 26, 1999; Label: Gothom, Overcore; Format: CD, cassette, digital download	—	—	—	—	—
Tongues	Released: June 19, 2001; Label: Gothom, Overcore; Format: CD, cassette, digital download	195	—	7	—	46
Repentance	Released: November 18, 2003; Label: Psychopathic; Format: CD, digital download	—	9	10	—	71
A-1 Yola	Released: April 19, 2005; Label: Psychopathic; Format: CD, digital download	176	6	12	23	48
Sacrificial Lambz	Released: August 26, 2008; Label: Reel Life; Format: CD, digital download	—	50	—	21	42
Suspended Animation	Released: August 3, 2010; Label: Reel Life; Format: CD, digital download	—	—	—	—	—
DMT Sessions	Released: June 21, 2011; Label: Reel Life; Format: CD, digital download	—	—	—	—	—
Venus Flytrap	Released: December 4, 2012; Label: Reel Life; Format: CD, digital download	—	—	—	—	—
Dichotomy	Released: July 31, 2015; Label: Reel Life; Format: CD, digital download	—	—	—	—	—
Scribble	Released: May 26, 2017; Label: Reel Life; Format: CD, digital download	—	—	—	—	—
Dead of Winter	Released: February 2, 2018; Label: Reel Life; Format: Digital download	—	—	—	—	—
She Loves Me	Released: February 2, 2020; Label: Reel Life; Format: Digital download	—	—	—	—	—
She Loves Me Not	Released: February 20, 2020; Label: Reel Life; Format: Digital download	—	—	—	—	—
Psyops	Released: December 17, 2021; Label: Reel Life; Format: CD, digital download	—	—	—	—	—
Purgatory	Released: July 7, 2023; Label: Reel Life; Format: CD, digital download	—	—	—	—	—
The Golden Age	Released: November 28, 2025; Label: Reel Life; Format: CD, digital download	—	—	—	—	—

=== Compilation albums ===
Title	Album details	Peak chart positions				
Title	Album details	US	US Heat	US Indie	US Rap	US R&B
Detroit Dogshit	Released: 1996; Label: Reel Life; Format: CD, cassette, digital download	—	—	—	—	—
Bootleg: From the Lost Vault, Vol. 1	Released: March 28, 2000; Label: Gothom, Overcore; Format: CD, cassette, digital download	—	—	—	—	—
Hatchet History: 10 Years Of Terror	Released: August 6, 2002; Label: Psychopathic; Format: CD, digital download	—	—	—	—	—
Acid Rain	Released: 2002; Label: Psychopathic; Format: CD, digital download	—	—	—	—	—
Insane Clown Posse - 20th Anniversary Hallowicked Collection	Released: October 31, 2015; Label: Psychopathic; Format: CD, digital download	—	—	—	—	—
Reel Life Hits & Acid Trips	Released: 2016; Label: Reel Life; Format: CD, digital download	—	—	—	—	—
The EP Collection (1991-1994)	Released: January 15, 2016; Label: Reel Life; Format: CD, digital download	—	—	—	—	—
Bloody Screamz Of '17	Released: October 31, 2017; Label: Psychopathic; Format: CD, digital download	—	—	—	—	—
Soopa Villainz - The Hit List	Released: July 26, 2020; Label: Reel Life; Format: CD, digital download	—	—	—	—	—

== Extended plays ==
Title	EP details	Peak chart positions				
Title	EP details	US	US Heat	US Indie	US Rap	US R&B
Erotic Poetry	Released: 1991; Label: Reel Life; Format: CD, digital download	—	—	—	—	—
Homey Don't Play	Released: 1991; Label: Reel Life; Format: CD, digital download	—	—	—	—	—
Hellterskkkelter	Released: 1993; Label: Reel Life; Format: CD, digital download	—	—	—	—	—
Maggot Brain Theory	Released: 1994; Label: Reel Life; Format: CD, digital download	—	—	—	—	—
Lamb Chopz	Released: 2007; Label: Reel Life; Format: Digital download	—	—	—	—	—
Esham 4 Mayor	Released: October 28, 2008; Label: Reel Life; Format: Digital download	—	—	—	—	—
I Ain't Cha Homey	Released: July 28, 2009; Label: Reel Life; Format: Digital download	—	—	—	—	—
Holy Black Mamba	Released: November 3, 2011; Label: Reel Life; Format: Digital download	—	—	—	—	—
Amuse-Bouche	Released: June 21, 2024; Label: Reel Life; Format: CD, digital download	—	—	—	—	—

== Mixtapes ==
Title	Mixtape details	Peak chart positions				
Title	Mixtape details	US	US Heat	US Indie	US Rap	US R&B
The Butcher Shop	Released: March 25, 2008; Label: Reel Life; Format: CD, digital download	—	—	—	—	86
DET (Doin Every Thang) - The Mixtape	Released: 2009; Label: Reel Life; Format: Digital download	—	—	—	—	—
The Dark Knight: The Return Of Bruce Wayne	Released: 2009; Label: Reel Life; Format: Digital download	—	—	—	—	—
Hellaween: Pure Horror	Released: October 13, 2009; Label: Reel Life; Format: Digital download	—	—	—	—	—
Secret Society Circus	Released: January 25, 2011; Label: Reel Life; Format: Digital download	—	—	—	—	—
Death of an Indie Label	Released: July 27, 2011; Label: Reel Life; Format: Digital download	—	—	—	—	—

== Singles ==
Year	Title	Album
1994	"Sunshine"	KKKill the Fetus
1994	"Stop Diggin' On The D-L"	Closed Casket
1994	"The Fear (Morty's Theme)"	The Fear (soundtrack)
1995	"Mental Stress"	Closed Casket
1996	"You Better Ask Somebody"	Dead Flowerz
1999	"Twirk Yo Body"	Mail Dominance
2001	"Silence Of The Hams"	Hallowicked 2001 Sampler
2001	"All Night Everyday"	Tongues
2003	"Pay" (Feat. Bone Thugs-n-Harmony)	Repentance
2003	"Woo Woo Woo"	Repentance
2003	"In Detroit"	Repentance
2003	"Thug Pit" (Feat. ICP, Kottonmouth Kings, Bone Thugs N' Harmony & Tech N9ne) "	Hallowicked 2003 Sampler
2008	"World Hustle"	Sacrificial Lambz
2010	"SSMD"	Suspended Animation
2011	"DMT Sessions"	DMT Sessions
2011	"Comatose"	DMT Sessions
2012	"Bath Salts"	Venus Fly Trap
2015	"Cosmic Car"	Dichotomy
2017	"Black Sheep"	Scribble
2017	"Trust No One"	Scribble
2020	"Bag Of Demons"	She Loves Me Not
2020	"Shark Food"	Single
2020	"Everybody Wants To Go To Heaven"	Single
2025	"Countdown To Zero"	Single

== Guest appearances ==
Year	Song	Artist(s)	Album
1992	"Taste"	Insane Clown Posse	Carnival of Carnage
1993	"Chop! Chop!"	Insane Clown Posse	Beverly Kills 50187
1993	"My Man, My Man, My Man (Bubble Gum Gangster Remix)"	Esham	Dance on the Wild Side (compilation)
1994	"The Fear (Morty's Theme)"	Esham	The Fear (soundtrack)
1995	"Losin It"	Project Born	Born Dead
1995	"Bitcheshate"	Mastamind	Lickkuidrano
1995	"Poemz"	Dice	The Neighborhoodshittalka
1996	"Player Hater"	The Dayton Family	F.B.I
1996	"Live"	Kid Rock	Early Mornin' Stoned Pimp
2000	"Traffic"	The Workhorse Movement	Sons of the Pioneers
2000	"Cunt Killers"	Esham	Race Riot (compilation)
2000	"Aftermath"	Know Good	Aftermath
2000	"Nite N Day"	Mastamind	Themindzi
2000	"Deep or Dolo"	Mastamind	Themindzi
2000	"Questions"	Insane Clown Posse	Bizzar
2001
2001	"Still Going Thru a Thang"	Ghetto E	Ghetto Theater
2001	"Resume Of A Killa"	Ghetto E	Ghetto Theater
2001	"Yes Yes Y'all"	Kool Keith	Spankmaster
2001	"Dark Vader"	Kool Keith	Spankmaster
2002	"Soopa Villains"	Insane Clown Posse	The Wraith: Shangri-La
2003	"Conquer"	Esham	Psychopathics from Outer Space 2 (compilation)
2003	"Oldie But Goodie"	Esham	Psychopathics from Outer Space 2 (compilation)
2003	"Demon Faces"	Esham	Psychopathics from Outer Space 2 (compilation)
2003	"24's on a '84"	Esham	Psychopathics from Outer Space 2 (compilation)
2003	"Wicked Wild"	Esham	Psychopathics from Outer Space 2 (compilation)
2003	"Bitch Shut Up"	Esham	Psychopathics from Outer Space 2 (compilation)
2003	"Killin' Spree"	Esham	Psychopathics from Outer Space 2 (compilation)
2003	"Enjoy Life"	Bedlam	Bedlamitez Rize
2003	"Don't Be"	Lavel	Nutty
2003	"Sticky Icky Situations"	Anybody Killa	Hatchet Warrior
2003	"World Is Hell"	Twiztid	The Green Book
2004	"Roll"	MC Breed	The New Prescription
2004	"Shotgun"/"Climbing"	Blaze Ya Dead Homie	Colton Grundy: The Undying
2004	"Outta My Way"	Monoxide	Chainsmoker LP
2005	"Deadbeat Moms"	Insane Clown Posse	The Calm
2005	"Bonus Flavor"	Twiztid	Man's Myth Vol. 1
2005	"Wicked Rappers Delight"	Insane Clown Posse	Forgotten Freshness Volume 4
2005	"Thug Pit"	Insane Clown Posse	Forgotten Freshness Volume 4
2006	"All Night Everyday"	Kool Keith	Collabs Tape
2008	"2Getha4eva"	Trick Trick	The Villain
2008	"Think Global"	T1	Technology
2008	"Human Tornado 2008"	Daniel Jordan	Daniel Jordan's Greatest Anti-Hits
2008	"I Murder"	DJ Clay	Let 'Em Bleed: The Mixxtape, Vol. 1
2008	"In Love With A Hooker"	DJ Clay	Let 'Em Bleed: The Mixxtape, Vol. 2
2008	"Can't Hold Me Back '08"	DJ Clay	Let 'Em Bleed: The Mixxtape, Vol. 3
2009	"Murder You Remix"	Mike E. Clark	Psychopathic Murder Mix Volume 1
2009	"The Riddler"	Daniel Jordan	Daniel Jordan's Essential Rarities Vol. 2
2009	"Van Helsing"	Daniel Jordan	Daniel Jordan's Essential Rarities Vol. 2
2009	"Fight Club"	Violent J	The Shining
2009	"MM Bang"	Mastamind	Toxsic Avenger
2010	"No Justice No Peace"	SickTanicK	From The Vault
2011	"Lasttemptation"	Mastamind	Last Temptation Of Christ
2011	"Bloodstainstheground"	Mastamind	Last Temptation Of Christ
2012	"Big Thangs"	J Dilla	Rebirth Of Detroit
2015	"Devil"	Scum & Q Strange	Snuff HD
2017	"Wolves"	Bukshot	Weirdo: Full Moon
2018	"C2H5OH" (Unofficial Test 400 Remix)	Damien Quinn	I'd Hang Out In My Garage But My Mom's A Hoarder
2018	"This Life"	Scum	Zippers Creepers
2018	"Still 7 Mile"	Flagrant Musick	Tha Dark

== Production credits ==
Year	Artist	Album	Song(s)	Record label(s)
1989	Esham	Boomin' Words from Hell		Self-released
1991	Esham	Erotic Poetry		Reel Life
1991	Esham	Homey Don't Play		Reel Life
1992	Esham	Judgement Day		Reel Life
1992	Insane Clown Posse	Carnival of Carnage	"Carnival of Carnage" and "Taste"	Psychopathic
1992	Natas	Life After Death		Reel Life
1993	Insane Clown Posse	Beverly Kills 50187	"17 Dead", "Chop! Chop!"	Psychopathic
1993	Esham	KKKill the Fetus		Reel Life
1993	Esham	Hellterskkkelter		Reel Life
1994	Natas	Blaz4me		Reel Life
1994	Esham	Maggot Brain Theory		Reel Life
1994	Esham	Closed Casket		Reel Life/Warlock
1995	Natas	Doubelievengod		Reel Life
1995	Mastamind	Lickkuidrano		Reel Life
1996	Dice	The Neighborhoodshittalka	"Rainz Itz Pourz", "Whatitbelike", "Gettin' High", "They Fucked Up", "Welcome2mygeto", "Immagangsta", "Funny How People Change", "Growing up as a Kid", "Poemz", "Everydog", "They Murdered My Brother", "Lonely Ruthless", "Theneighborhoodshittalka"	Reel Life
1996	Esham	Dead Flowerz		Reel Life
1997	Esham	Bruce Wayne: Gothom City 1987		Gothom
1997	20 Dead Flower Children	Candy, Toy Guns & Television	Untitled Hidden Track, "The Safety Dance"	Gothom/Overcore
1997	Natas	Multikillionaire: The Devil's Contract		Gothom/Overcore
1999	Esham	Mail Dominance		Gothom/Overcore
1999	Natas	WicketWorldWide.COM		Gothom/Overcore
2001	Kool Keith	Spankmaster	"I Wanna Play", "Drugs", "Blackula", "Dark Vader", "Spankmaster (Take Off Your Clothes)"	Gothom/Overcore
2001	Esham	Tongues		Gothom/Overcore
2002	Natas	Godlike		Number 6
2003	Anybody Killa	Hatchet Warrior	"Hollowpoint"	
Esham	Repentance		Psychopathic	
2004	Insane Clown Posse	Hell's Pit	Psychopathic	"The Night of the .44", "Bowling Balls", "24", "Basehead Attack", "Angels Falling", "Manic Depressive", "Real Underground Baby"
2004	MC Breed	The New Prescription	"Intro"	UMZ
2005	Esham	A-1 Yola	"Since Day One", "Turbulence", "Bolivia", "Bird After Bird", "Justa Hustler", "Yoca Cola", "Fall Into The Fire", "Wicket", "Enemies", "Help Me", "Servin'", "Bangin' Dope", "Unhappy", "?", "Smiley Faces"	Psychopathic
2005	Twiztid	Man's Myth (Vol. 1)	"The Argument"	Psychopathic
2006	Natas	N of tha World		Reel Life/Gothom/Warlock
2007	Esham	Lamb Chopz		Reel Life/Gothom
2008	Esham	The Butcher Shop	"Lamb Chopz", "American Psycho", "Deadbeat Mom", "Forgot About E", "Mr. Honeynut Cheerioz", "I Got Flow", "Reel Life, "?????", "Monster"	Reel Life/Gothom
2008	Esham	Sacrificial Lambz		Reel Life/Gothom
2009	Mastamind	Toxsic Avenger		Reel Life/Gothom
2009	Daniel Jordan	Daniel Jordan's Essential Rarities Vol. 2	"The Riddler", "Van Helsing"	Kill All Idols
2009	Esham	I Ain't Cha Homey		Reel Life/Gothom
2009	Esham	Hellaween: Pure Horror		Reel Life/Gothom
2010	Esham	Suspended Animation		Reel Life
2011	Esham	Secret Society Circus		Reel Life
2011	Esham	DMT Sessions		Reel Life
2011	Chupacabra	Drug Addict		Reel Life
2011	Daniel Jordan	The Stranger		Reel Life
2011	Esham	Holy Black Mamba		Reel Life

== Video albums ==
Year	DVD
2005	A-1 Yola (bonus DVD): Released: April 19, 2005; Label: Psychopathic; Notes: Contains music videos for each of the album's songs, including hidden tracks.

== Music videos ==
Year	Title	Director(s)	Album
1989	"Don't Trip"	—	Boomin Words From Hell
1993	"Hellterskkkelter"	—	KKKill the Fetus
1994	"Mental Stress"	—	Closed Casket
1994	"The Fear (Morty's Theme)"	—	The Fear (soundtrack)
2003	"Woo Woo Woo"	Roy Knyrim	Repentance
2003	"In Detroit"	Esham	Repentance
2005	"Since Day One"	Esham	A-1 Yola
2005	"Turbulance"	Esham	A-1 Yola
2005	"Bolivia"	Esham	A-1 Yola
2005	"Bird After Bird"	Esham	A-1 Yola
2005	"Justa Hustla"	Esham	A-1 Yola
2005	"Yoca Cola"	Esham	A-1 Yola
2005	"Fall Into The Fire"	Esham	A-1 Yola
2005	"Wicket"	Esham	A-1 Yola
2005	"Help Me"	Esham	A-1 Yola
2005	"Servin'"	Esham	A-1 Yola
2005	"Bangin' Dope"	Esham	A-1 Yola
2005	"One Hundred"	Esham	A-1 Yola
2005	"Unhappy"	Esham	A-1 Yola
2005	"Smiley Faces"	Esham	A-1 Yola
2006	"Detroit Stand Up"	Esham	Judgement Day (box set)
2006	"Fortune Teller"	Esham	—
2007	"American Psycho"	Esham	Lamb Chopz
2008	"World Hustle"	Esham	—
2008	"Zeitgest"	Esham	Sacrificial Lambz
2008	"Livin Legend"	Esham	Sacrificial Lambz
2008	"Dead Rappers"	Esham	Sacrificial Lambz
2008	"Fallen Down"	Esham	Sacrificial Lambz
2008	"Keys to the City"	Esham	—
2009	"Zombieland"	Esham	Hellaween: Pure Horror
2009	"Happy Happy Joy Joy"	Esham	I Ain't Cha Homey
2010	"Stop Selling Me Drugs"	Esham	Suspended Animation
2010	"Gumball 3000 - Detroit Pony Wars"	Esham	Suspended Animation
2011	"A 6iccness"	Esham	Secret Society Circus
2011	"Comatose"	Esham	DMT Sessions
2011	"sildenafil citrate, skrewberry kush, codeine phosphate promethazine"	Esham	DMT Sessions
2011	"lysergic acid diethylamide oxycontin clonazepam"	Esham	DMT Sessions
2011	"Clonazepam"	Esham	DMT Sessions
2011	"Pricele$$ Ble$$ing$"	Esham	Death of an Indie Label
2011	"Scante"	Esham	DMT Sessions
2011	"Police"	Esham	Suspended Animation
2011	"Holy Black Mamba"	Esham	Holy Black Mamba
2020	"Bag of Demons"	Esham	She Loves Me Not
