= Reel Life Productions discography =

Reel Life Productions, also known as Gothom, is an independent record label formed in 1990. Based in Detroit, Michigan in the United States, it was formed by rapper Esham and his older brother James H. Smith.

== Catalog ==
| Year | Artist | Title | Peak chart positions | | | | | RIAA Certification (sales thresholds) | Co-labels |
| Year | Artist | Title | US Rap | US | US Indie | US R&B | US Heat | RIAA Certification (sales thresholds) | Co-labels |
|---|---|---|---|---|---|---|---|---|---|
| 1989 | Esham | Boomin Words From Hell | — | — | — | — | — | — | — |
| 1991 | Esham | Erotic Poetry EP | — | — | — | — | — | — | — |
| 1991 | Esham | Homey Don't Play EP | — | — | — | — | — | — | — |
| 1992 | Esham | Judgement Day Vol. 1 & 2 | — | — | — | — | — | — | — |
| 1992 | NATAS | Life After Death | — | — | — | — | — | — | — |
| 1993 | Esham | KKKill The Fetus | — | — | — | — | — | — | — |
| 1993 | Esham | Hellterskkkelter EP | — | — | — | — | — | — | — |
| 1994 | NATAS | Blaz4me | — | — | — | — | — | — | — |
| 1994 | Esham | Maggot Brain Theory EP | — | — | — | — | — | — | — |
| 1994 | Esham | Closed Casket | — | — | — | — | — | — | — |
| 1995 | Mastamind | Lickkuiddrano EP | — | — | — | — | — | — | — |
| 1995 | NATAS | Doubelievengod? | — | — | — | — | — | — | — |
| 1996 | Dice | The Neighborhoodshittalka | — | — | — | — | — | — | — |
| 1996 | Esham | Dead Flowerz | — | — | — | 38 | — | — | — |
| 1997 | Esham | Detroit Dogshit | — | — | — | — | — | — | — |
| 1997 | Esham | Bruce Wayne: Gothom City 1987 | — | — | — | 57 | — | — | — |
| 1997 | 20 Dead Flower Children | Candy, Toy Guns & Television | — | — | — | — | — | — | Overcore Records |
| 1997 | NATAS | Multikillionaire: The Devil's Contract | — | — | — | — | — | — | Overcore Records |
| 1998 | The Workhorse Movement | Rhythm & Soul Cartel | — | — | — | — | — | — | Overcore Records |
| 1999 | Esham | Mail Dominance | — | — | — | — | — | — | Overcore Records |
| 1999 | NATAS | WicketWorldWide.com | — | — | — | — | — | — | Overcore Records |
| 2000 | Esham | Bootleg: From the Lost Vault, Vol. 1 | — | — | — | — | — | — | Overcore Records |
| 2000 | Mastamind | Themindzi | — | — | — | — | — | — | Overcore Records |
| 2001 | Ghetto E | Ghetto Theater | — | — | 11 | 54 | 17 | — | Overcore Records |
| 2001 | Shoestring | Cross Addicted | — | — | — | — | — | — | Overcore Records |
| 2001 | Kool Keith | Spankmaster | — | — | 11 | 48 | 16 | — | Overcore Records |
| 2001 | Bootleg | Hated By Many Loved By Few | — | 174 | 6 | 38 | — | — | Overcore Records |
| 2001 | Esham | Tongues | — | 195 | 7 | 46 | 14 | — | Overcore Records |
| 2002 | NATAS | Godlike | — | — | — | — | — | — | — |
| 2006 | NATAS | N of tha World | — | — | — | — | — | — | Warlock Records |
| 2006 | Esham | Martyr Sity | — | — | — | — | — | — | — |
| 2007 | Esham | Lamb Chopz EP | — | — | — | — | — | — | — |
| 2008 | Esham | Esham Presents: The Butcher Shop | — | — | — | 86 | — | — | — |
| 2008 | Esham | Sacrificial Lambz | — | — | — | 42 | 50 | — | — |
| 2008 | D.E.T | Doin Every Thang | — | — | — | — | — | — | — |
| 2009 | Mastamind | Toxsic Avenger | — | — | — | — | — | — | — |
| 2009 | Esham | I Aint Cha Homey | — | — | — | — | — | — | — |
| 2009 | Esham | Hellaween: Pure Horror | — | — | — | — | — | — | — |
| 2009 | NATAS | The Vatican EP | — | — | — | — | — | — | — |
| 2010 | Esham | Suspended Animation | — | — | — | — | — | — | — |
| 2010 | Esham | Suspended Extended | — | — | — | — | — | — | — |
| 2010 | Mastamind | Mastercard EP | — | — | — | — | — | — | — |
| 2010 | King Solomon | 1 Shot Deal | — | — | — | — | — | — | — |
| 2010 | DeadBoy | Anubis Wisdom | — | — | — | — | — | — | — |
| 2011 | Esham | Secret Society Circus | — | — | — | — | — | — | — |
| 2011 | Esham | DMT Sessions | — | — | — | — | — | — | — |
| 2011 | Esham | Death of an Indie Label | — | — | — | — | — | — | — |
| 2011 | Chupacabra | Drug Addict | — | — | — | — | — | — | — |
| 2011 | Daniel Jordan | The Stranger | — | — | — | — | — | — | — |
| 2011 | Esham | Holy Black Mamba EP | — | — | — | — | — | — | — |
| 2011 | Doc Hollywood Hustle | RLP Will Never Die | — | — | — | — | — | — | — |
| 2012 | Esham | Venus Flytrap | — | — | — | — | — | — | — |
| 2014 | NATAS | FUQERRBDY | — | — | — | — | — | — | — |
| 2015 | Esham | Dichotomy | — | — | — | — | — | — | — |
| 2017 | Esham | Scribble | — | — | — | — | — | — | — |
| 2018 | Esham | Dead Of Winter | — | — | — | — | — | — | — |
