= Bootleg: From the Lost Vault, Vol. 1 =

Greatest hits album by Esham
- Released: March 28, 2000
- Label: Gothom/Overcore

Esham chronology
| Detroit Dogshit (1997) | Bootleg: From the Lost Vault, Vol. 1 (2000) | Acid Rain (2002) |

Professional ratings
Review scores
| Source | Rating |
|---|---|
| Allmusic | link |

Bootleg: From the Lost Vault, Vol. 1 is the second compilation album by Esham, released on March 28, 2000.

== Reception ==
Allmusic reviewer Jason Birchmeier wrote that "Bootleg [...] [is] by no means a definitive roundup, but it makes for an adequate introduction to his music."

== Track listing ==
| No. | Title | Lyrics | Music | Length |
|---|---|---|---|---|
| 1. | "Kkkill The Fetus" | | KKKill the Fetus | 4:43 |
| 2. | "As I Rock-n-Roll" | | original | 1:31 |
| 3. | "Redrum" | | Boomin' Words from Hell | 4:02 |
| 4. | "Fallen Angel" | | Judgement Day, Vol. 1: Day | 3:19 |
| 5. | "Thinking To Myself" | | Judgement Day, Vol. 1: Day | 2:27 |
| 6. | "Dumb Bitch" | | Judgement Day, Vol. 2: Night | 1:33 |
| 7. | "Morty's Theme" | | The Fear Soundtrack | 3:35 |
| 8. | "Black Orchid" | | Dead Flowerz | 4:48 |
| 9. | "Outcha Atmosphere" | | Mail Dominance | 3:34 |
| 10. | "Midnight Hour" | | Doubelievengod | 3:19 |
| 11. | "Price On Ya Head" | | Multikillionaire: The Devil's Contract | 3:07 |
| 12. | "Watch Ya Back" | | Boomin' Words from Hell (1989 version) | 2:30 |
| 13. | "What" | | Dead Flowerz | 2:39 |
| 14. | "Comerica" | | Bruce Wayne: Gothom City 1987 | 2:36 |
| 15. | "Suffer The Consequences" | | original | 2:56 |
| 16. | "Monkey Mix" | "Twirk Yo Body" from Mail Dominance | original | 3:42 |
