= Detroit Dogshit =

Greatest hits album by Esham
- Released: 1997
- Label: Reel Life
- Producer: Esham

Esham chronology
Detroit Dogshit (1997)	Bootleg: From the Lost Vault, Vol. 1 (2000)

Professional ratings
Review scores
Source	Rating
Allmusic	link

Detroit Dogshit is a compilation album by the rapper Esham. Released in 1997, it is the first compilation album by the rapper, and contains tracks from Esham's albums and extended plays from the years 1989–1994.

== Track listing ==
No.	Title	Music	Length
1.	"Mental Stress (remix)"	originally from Closed Casket	5:03
2.	"Fear"	previously unreleased	4:08
3.	"Rocks Off! (remix)"	originally from Hellterskkkelter	3:36
4.	"4 All The Suicidalists"	originally from Boomin' Words from Hell	4:00
5.	"Get My Head Together"	originally from Life After Death	4:16
6.	"Acid"	originally from Judgement Day, Vol. 1: Day)	3:38
7.	"Losin my Religion"	originally from Judgement Day, Vol. 1: Day	1:58
8.	"I'd Rather be Dead"	originally from Judgement Day, Vol. 1: Day	2:50
9.	"Momma Was a Junkie"	originally from Judgement Day, Vol. 1: Day	4:16
10.	"Out Cha Mind"	originally from Homey Don't Play	4:25
11.	"Word After Word"	originally from Boomin' Words from Hell	3:45
12.	"The Wicket Shit Will Never Die"	originally from Closed Casket	3:33
13.	"Pussy Ain't Got No Face"	originally from Boomin' Words from Hell	3:34
14.	"Devil's Groove"	originally from Boomin' Words from Hell	3:07
15.	"Maggot Brain Theory"	originally from Maggot Brain Theory	2:47
16.	"I'll be Glad When You Dead"	originally from Closed Casket	2:51
17.	"30 Birdz"	previously unreleased	4:08
18.	"S.O.M.D"	originally from Blaz4me	3:29
19.	"Flatline"	originally from Closed Casket	3:03
20.	"Wake Da Dead"	originally from Judgement Day, Vol. 2: Night	3:59
Total length:			69:06
