= Judgement Day (Esham album) =

Studio album by Esham
- Released: April 9, 1992
- Recorded: 1991–92
- Genre: Horrorcore
- Length: 92:30
- Label: Reel Life
- Producer: Esham

Esham chronology
Boomin' Words from Hell (1989)	Judgement Day (1992)	KKKill the Fetus (1993)

Judgement Day is the second studio album by American rapper Esham, released April 9, 1992. On June 6, 2006, a Judgement Day box set was issued, containing both original volumes and previously unreleased material.

== Production ==
Reel Life Productions founder and Esham's brother James Smith decided that Esham should record a double album following the release of Prince's Love Symbol Album. Smith thought that if an R&B artist could record a double album, a rapper should record a double album. However, it is not the first double album in hip hop, as previously DJ Jazzy Jeff & The Fresh Prince released He's the DJ, I'm the Rapper, which was a double album in its original vinyl configuration.

== Music ==
While the lyrical content of Judgement Day is similar to that of Esham's debut, Boomin' Words from Hell, the music features a heavier use of rock samples.

== Release history ==
Judgement Day was released separately in two volumes, Day and Night, on April 9, 1992. On June 6, 2006, a Judgement Day box set was released, featuring both original volumes remastered, two volumes of previously unreleased material, the exclusive album Martyr City, an illustrated booklet with a short autobiography written by Esham detailing the days of the original Judgement Day release as well as a background story for Martyr City, a live concert DVD, deluxe packaging and a Certificate of Authenticity.

== Reception ==
Allmusic's Jason Birchmeier wrote that Judgement Day, Vol. 1 "may not be his most well-crafted work, but it certainly stands as his most inspired work of the '90s", while Vol. 2 "isn't quite as strong as the first volume, suffering mostly from a number of weak tracks [...] the first volume doesn't rely quite so much on cheap shock, instead focusing on evocative horror motifs, making Judgement Day, Vol. 2 the less important of the two."

== Judgement Day Vol. 1 ==
=== Track listing ===
Professional ratings
Review scores
Source	Rating
Allmusic	Vol. 1:

Vol. 1: Day (1992)
No.	Title	Length
1.	"Nine Dead Bodies"	2:15
2.	"The Boogieman"	1:58
3.	"How Do I Plead to Homicide"	3:54
4.	"I'd Rather Be Dead"	2:50
5.	"Momma Was a Junkie"	4:05
6.	"Once You Go Black"	4:30
7.	"Makin' More Music"	3:15
8.	"Hit and Run"	2:51
9.	"Thinking to Myself"	2:27
10.	"Fallen Angel"	3:19
11.	"I Met This Little Girlie"	3:13
12.	"Acid"	3:30
13.	"Devilish Mood"	2:27
14.	"My Last Words"	3:12
15.	"Losin My Religion"	1:55
Total length:		46:26

== Judgement Day Vol. 2 ==
=== Track listing ===
Professional ratings
Review scores
Source	Rating
Allmusic	Vol. 2

Vol. 2: Night (1992)
No.	Title	Length
1.	"Judgement Day"	3:29
2.	"Living in Incest"	3:37
3.	"Play Dead"	2:43
4.	"13 Ways"	3:26
5.	"Finger in the Cake Mix"	4:12
6.	"The Devil Gets Funky"	3:38
7.	"Crib Death"	2:07
8.	"Dead By Day"	2:00
9.	"Wake the Dead"	3:57
10.	"Dumb Bitch"	1:31
11.	"U Wanna Know Somethin"	1:18
12.	"Hoe Role"	3:41
13.	"Dyin' to Be Down"	3:23
14.	"Sell Me Yo' Soul"	3:53
15.	"We Got Some Nonbelievers"	2:18
Total length:		46:04

== Judgement Day Vol. 3 ==
=== Track listing ===
Vol. 3: Ascending (2006)
No.	Title	Length
1.	"The Devil's in Da House"	3:19
2.	"How Much is Ya Life Worth"	4:18
3.	"Preacherz Daughter"	2:39
4.	"Deathwish"	4:38
5.	"Memories of Abuse"	3:06
6.	"Nice with my Hands"	3:41
7.	"Original 24/7"	3:46
8.	"Save the Drama 4 Ya Mama"	2:44
9.	"Fucked Up in the Head" (feat. T-N-T)	3:38
10.	"Hold on Tight"	2:54
11.	"Would U Die 4 Me"	2:36
12.	"Suck My Dick"	1:10
13.	"Jokers Wild"	4:58
14.	"Listen 2 a Deadman Speak"	5:01
15.	"Toejam"	2:57
16.	"Pussycat"	4:15
17.	"Bloody Mary"	3:26
18.	"Just Another Pretty Face"	3:06
Total length:		62:12

== Judgement Day Vol. 4 ==
=== Track listing ===
Vol. 4: Descending (2006)
No.	Title	Length
1.	"Unbelievable"	3:00
2.	"2 A Funky Azz Beat"	4:07
3.	"Freakbone"	3:34
4.	"All My Friends Are Dead"	3:49
5.	"Talk Dirty to Em"	2:15
6.	"Youz A Bitch"	3:03
7.	"Unholy Rock & Roll"	3:48
8.	"Heartburn"	2:16
9.	"Where U From Fool"	2:47
10.	"Erotic Poetry 3"	3:33
11.	"Gimmy My"	2:44
12.	"Nappy Head"	3:06
13.	"Shitlist"	3:25
14.	"When I Say Bitch"	4:26
15.	"Don't Need Ya Hoe"	4:24
16.	"'89 Freestyle"	3:18
17.	"'91 Osborn H.S. Talent Show"	3:04
18.	"Soopamack"	5:11
19.	"Keep On Twerkin"	5:29
20.	"Musical Madness"	5:41
Total length:		73:00

== Martyr Sity ==
=== Track listing ===
Martyr Sity (2006)
No.	Title	Length
1.	"Intro"	1:52
2.	"Hate Me"	1:46
3.	"Here Comes the Antichrist"	3:00
4.	"My Life"	3:58
5.	"Workin' for the Devil"	3:40
6.	"Detroit Stand Up"	2:43
7.	"Get Guap"	3:19
8.	"Cocaine"
9.	"What Up Doe" (feat. Doc "Hollywood" Hustle)	5:18
10.	"Automatic"	5:15
11.	"Fuck Y’all"	3:28
12.	"E-S-H-A-M (Every Shooter Has A Motive)"	2:42
13.	"Understanding"	4:21
14.	"Martyr Sity"	2:42

== Bonus DVD: Live at the 2004 Gathering of the Juggalos ==
=== Track listing ===
Bonus DVD: Live at the 2004 Gathering of the Juggalos (2006)
No.	Title	Length
1.	"Woo Woo Woo Woo (Repentance)"
2.	"Comerica (Bruce Wayne: Gothom City 1987)"
3.	"Esham Hype Up 1"
4.	"Charlie Manson (from Dead Flowerz)"
5.	"Foodstamp (from Dead Flowerz)"
6.	"Devil Shit (from Tongues)"
7.	"Esham Hype Up 2"
8.	"Midnight (from Doubelievengod)"
9.	"The Wicket Shit Will Never Die (from Closed Casket)"
10.	"Maggot Brain Theory (from Maggot Brain Theory)"
11.	"Esham Hype Up 3"
12.	"Migraine Headache"
13.	"Boom!" (feat. Insane Clown Posse (from Repentance))
14.	"Brain Surgery (from Tongues)"
15.	"Esham Hype Up 4"
16.	"Slug Froma .45 (from Closed Casket)"
17.	"In Detroit" (feat. T-N-T (from Repentance))
18.	"Boss Up (from Repentance)"
