= WicketWorldWide.COM =

Studio album by Natas
- Released: October 26, 1999
- Recorded: May–July, 1999
- Genre: Hip hop
- Length: 69:04
- Label: Gothom/Overcore
- Producer: Esham

Natas chronology
Multikillionaire: The Devil's Contract (1997)	WicketWorldWide.COM (1999)	Godlike (2002)

Professional ratings
Review scores
Source	Rating
Allmusic	4.5/5 stars

WicketWorldWide.COM is the fifth album by Natas. Released in 1999, it is the group's last release on Reel Life Productions (then known as Gothom/Overcore) until 2006's N of tha World. WicketWorldWide.com is credited as one of the greatest hip hop albums of 1999 by XXL magazine.

== Music and lyrics ==
WicketWorldWide.COM differentiates itself from previous Natas albums in showcasing live instrumentation courtesy of the $500,000.00 advance Esham was given by TVT Records when he signed a distribution deal with TVT in October 1999. TVT even provided a studio with help from Johnathon Scott Santos, who has produced and mixed albums for bands including Circle Jerks and former Esham backing bands 20 Dead Flower Children and The Workhorse Movement. Esham took advantage of the live band instead of the focus on heavy sampling that previous group’s albums featured. Allmusic described the sound as "a potent collage of gritty hip-hop beats with an aggressive rock tone", noting the relevance of this sound in relation to the group's influence on rap rock artists like Kid Rock and Limp Bizkit. Murder Dog magazine rated this album #1 of all rap albums released in 1999.

Allmusic also noted a step forward in lyrical content, writing "It's just far too hard to stomach his group's blatant theatrics of old—raunchy sex, Satanic baiting, unnecessary morbidity, an overall sense of utter irresponsibility, violent gang mentality".

== Cover art ==
Hieronymus Bosch, The Garden of Earthly Delights, oil on oak panels, 220 x 389 cm, Museo del Prado, Madrid

The album cover was designed by Myron Matthew Kozuch-Rea. The design features the iconic "NATAS" logo along with the "Wicket World Wide.COM" strategically placed in front of the middle part of Hieronymus Bosch's famous oil painting The Garden of Earthly Delights. When asked about the cover in an interview in 2008 when promoting his album Sacrifical Lambz. Esham stated that "The painting matched the concept of the album's title and gave the album its true identity."

== Release and reception ==
Natas released the album on October 26, 1999, during "The Armageddon Show". The concert gained attention from TVT records and they re-released the album on January 4, 2000, with a different cover. The original cover contained red letters where the TVT release was purple letters. TVT also sponsored a tour for Esham and Natas which featured other midwest horrorcore rap groups Halfbreed and Bedlam. The TVT Records edition of WicketWorldWide.COM was released in a limited edition, which contained a bonus EP featuring 2 Natas songs from their previous album Multikillionaire: The Devil's Contract, an old esham song "The Fear (Morty's Theme), and an unreleased song titled "I Wind". Allmusic reviewer Jason Birchmeier wrote "It may have taken Esham nearly a decade to guide his group to this point, but the slow evolution and persistence on his part finally pays off: This is an important album, even if it didn't sell many copies." MTV often played part of the instrumental for the song "Like A Spirit" in a loop for promotional commercial's for the final season of their show Undressed.

== Track listing ==
No.	Title	Performer(s)	Length
1.	"Telly Savales"	Esham, Mastamind	2:19
2.	"Kill Me"	Mastamind	2:32
3.	"The One"	Esham, T-N-T, Mastamind	4:18
4.	"Another Enemy"	Esham, Mastamind	3:18
5.	"Oriental Spas"	Esham	2:57
6.	"Like A Spirit"	Mastamind	2:47
7.	"Football"	Mastamind, Esham, T-N-T	3:40
8.	"Levitation"	Esham, Mastamind, T-N-T	3:18
9.	"Cyberkill"	T-N-T	3:33
10.	"Forever Fly"	Esham, Mastamind, T-N-T	4:54
11.	"Metropolis"	Esham, T-N-T, Mastamind	4:10
12.	"The Truth"	Mastamind, Esham, T-N-T	3:42
13.	"Party People"	Mastamind, T-N-T	2:16
14.	"WWW.Com"	Mastamind	4:05
15.	"Funeral Parlor"	Esham, T-N-T	3:57
16.	"The Biggest"	Mastamind, Esham	2:13
17.	"Let It Flow"	Mastamind	2:10
18.	"Virgin Mary"	Mastamind, Esham, T-N-T	2:48
19.	"Bite It"	Esham, Mastamind, T-N-T	2:53
20.	"Cancun"	Mastamind, T-N-T, Esham	3:16
21.	"Motivate"	Mastamind	5:04
Total length:			70:05

Special limited edition collectors item
No.	Title	Performer(s)	Length
1.	"We All Die"	Esham, Mastamind, T-N-T, Moebadis	3:19
2.	"Morty's Theme"	Esham	3:59
3.	"Multikillionaire"	Mastamind	3:13
4.	"I Wind"	Esham	2:46
Total length:			13:17

== Personnel ==
=== Musicians ===
- Esham: Performer
- Mastamind: Performer
- TNT: Performer

=== Production ===
- Producer: Esham
- Producer: Santos
- Programming: Esham, Santos
- Arranger: Esham
- Liner notes: Esham
