= Black Monday (album) =

Studio album by Dice
- Released: October 24, 2000
- Genres: Gangsta rap; Midwest hip hop
- Label: Fallen Angelz Entertainment

Dice chronology
The Neighborhoodshittalka (1996)	Black Monday (2000)	Red Rain (2005)

Black Monday is the third album by Detroit rapper Dice. The album contains a diss track aimed at Esham, "Kkkill the Fetus". The album sold 8,000 units.

== Track listing ==
No.	Title	Writer(s)	Length
1.	"Entro"	Adams; Boyd	0:28
2.	"Black Monday"	Adams; Boyd	3:50
3.	"Apt. 3, Pt. 1"	Adams; Boyd	4:21
4.	"Whut Up Doe"	Boyd; Wilson	4:26
5.	"Fiendz (Skit 1)"	Boyd	0:21
6.	"Set Up Shop"	Adams; Boyd; McWilliams; Vernon	2:44
7.	"Dope (Skit 2)"	Boyd	0:08
8.	"Ride Dat"	Boyd; Wilson	3:06
9.	"Geto Luv"	Adams; Boyd; Colvin	3:35
10.	"Gloria"	Adams; Boyd	3:44
11.	"Pay 2 Play"	Boyd; Wilson	3:23
12.	"Snorting [Skit 3]"	Boyd	0:18
13.	"Cocaine"	Boyd; Wilson	4:04
14.	"Apt. 3, Pt. 2"	Boyd; Rahim	3:06
15.	"Last Summa"	Adams; Boyd; Hansberry	4:15
16.	"Dime"	Boyd; Crosby; Johnson	4:19
17.	"Imma Dog"	Adams; Boyd	3:41
18.	"Kkkill the Fetus"	Boyd; Wilson	2:40
19.	"Fallen Angelz"	Adams; Bell; Boyd; Raymaey; Shabazz	5:01
20.	"Rainy Dayz"	Boyd	4:31
21.	"Fallen Down [Skit 4]"	Boyd	0:06
22.	"My Life"	Adams; Boyd	5:04
Total length:			67:55
