= FUQERRBDY =

Album by Natas

Studio album by Natas
- Released: July 15, 2014
- Recorded: 2013–2014
- Genre: Hip-hop
- Length: 52:21
- Label: Reel Life Productions
- Producer: Esham, Mastamind

Natas chronology
N of tha World (2006)	FUQERRBDY (2014)

FUQERRBDY is the eighth and final studio album by Detroit rap group Natas. This is the group's first studio album as a trio since 2002's Godlike and the first Natas album since 2006's N of tha World. It was released in 2014, on the newly relaunched Reel Life Productions. This is the final Natas album with TnT, who was killed in a car accident on December 20, 2014.

== Background and recording ==
In 2013, it was announced on Mastamind's official Facebook account that a new Natas album was planned for release after the release of his next album, The Ultimate Price. This was later confirmed by Esham and then later by Mastamind's label, Lyrikal Snuff Productionz. On December 8, 2013, once again via his official Facebook account, Mastamind announced that recording of the new Natas album was completed and was in the mixing stages. Esham, Mastamind, and the official Natas Facebook confirmed that "FUQERRBDY" would be released on July 15, 2014.

== Track listing ==
No.	Title	Length
1.	"Fuqerrbdy"	3:31
2.	"I Love You"	3:33
3.	"On Some"	3:56
4.	"N.I.K.E."	2:41
5.	"Question Mark"	2:32
6.	"Dead Woke"	2:31
7.	"Convulsions"	3:19
8.	"The World Iz Natas"	3:18
9.	"Smokkk En Drankkk"	3:51
10.	"Future Kill"	5:37
11.	"Burn"	2:40
12.	"But Not Us"	3:29
13.	"Where Yo Hood @"	3:02
14.	"Lord Have Mercy"	3:47
15.	"747"	4:32
Total length:		53:08
