= The Neighborhoodshittalka =

Studio album by Dice
- Released: 1996
- Genres: Gangsta rap; Midwest hip hop
- Label: Reel Life Productions
- Producer: Esham

Dice chronology
The 40 Made Me Do It (1992)	The Neighborhoodshittalka (1996)	Black Monday (2000)

The Neighborhoodshittalka is the second album by Detroit rapper Dice. Released in 1996, the album is Dice's only release on Reel Life Productions, following appearances on other albums by the label, including Natas' Doubelievengod and Mastamind's EP Lickkuidrano, Dice estimated that the album sold 20,000 copies, and claims to have received no royalties from the album.

== Legacy ==
The album was reissued in 1999 with distribution by Overture Music, the parent company to Reel Life's successor, Gothom/Overcore. Russell Culvin, the founder of Fallen Angelz Entertainment, which Dice cofounded in 2000, stated in a 2006 interview that he wanted to purchase the rights to the album from Reel Life cofounder James Smith, who was in prison at the time. As of 2011, The Neighborhoodshittalka is now available at http://dicestore.bigcartel.com/.

== Track listing ==
No.	Title	Lyrics	Music	Length
1.	"Rainz Itz Pourz"	Dice	Esham	3:48
2.	"The Life Dat I Lived"	Dice	Wilson	3:28
3.	"Whatitbelike" (with Razzaq)	Dice; Razzaq	Esham	4:08
4.	"Gettin' High"	Dice	Esham	4:25
5.	"They Fucked Up"	Dice	Esham	3:10
6.	"Welcome2mygeto"	Dice	Esham	3:06
7.	"Immagangsta" (with Razzaq)	Dice; Razzaq	Esham; Razzaq	3:18
8.	"Funny How People Change"	Dice	Esham	2:37
9.	"Growing up as a Kid"	Dice	Esham	2:36
10.	"Poemz" (with Esham & Razzaq)	Dice; Esham	Esham; Razzaq	4:10
11.	"Everydog"	Dice	Esham	3:35
12.	"Behind Bars"	Dice	Wilson	1:44
13.	"They Murdered My Brother"	Dice	Esham	2:10
14.	"Lonely Ruthless"	Dice	Esham	3:04
15.	"Theneighborhoodshittalka" (with Razzaq)	Dice	Esham; Razzaq	4:08
