= Death of an Indie Label =

Death of An Indie Label
- Starring: Esham; James Smith; Mastamind
- Music by: Esham
- Production company: Reel Life
- Release date: July 27, 2011
- Country: United States
- Language: English

Death of An Indie Label is a documentary & soundtrack about the independent record label Reel Life Productions, founded by James H. Smith and his younger brother, rapper Esham, in Detroit in 1990. The film, which was uploaded onto the label's YouTube channel, features appearances by James Smith, Esham and Mastamind. The soundtrack for the film features Seven the General and Poe Whosaine.

== Summary ==
James Smith and his younger brother, Esham, a rapper, found the independent record label Reel Life Productions in 1988. In 1989, Esham records his debut album, Boomin' Words from Hell in one day. In 1992, Esham founds a group, Natas, who release their debut album, Life After Death on Reel Life. Natas and Reel Life Productions are the subject of much controversy when a 17-year-old fan killed himself while smoking cannabis and playing Russian roulette while listening to Life After Death. Esham goes on to influence local artists Kid Rock, Eminem and Insane Clown Posse. James Smith, the CEO of Reel Life Productions, is diagnosed with schizophrenia following a prison sentence. Smith's deteriorating mental state is depicted. Due to the poor living conditions of his apartment, James is evicted by his landlady, and moves in with Esham.

== Reception ==
The Metro Times describes the film as "compelling viewing".

== Soundtrack ==
Death of an Indie Label

Mixtape by Esham
- Released: September 1, 2011
- Genre: Midwest hip hop, hardcore hip hop, indie hip hop
- Label: Reel Life

Esham chronology
Hellaween: Pure Horror (2009)	Death of an Indie Label (2011)

Death of an Indie Label is the third mixtape by Esham. Released in 2011, it is the soundtrack to the documentary film of the same name and features Detroit emcees "Poe Whosaine" & Seven the General

No.	Title	Length
1.	"Comatose"
2.	"Denouement"
3.	"Reignin"
4.	"Odd Future"
5.	"Orgy Orange"
6.	"Priceless Blessings"
7.	"Cheddaphile" (feat. Seven the General)
8.	"Time Machine"
9.	"Sayonara"
10.	"U Aint Got Nuthin On Me" (feat. Poe Whosaine)
11.	"Serious Business"
12.	"House 4 Rent"
13.	"Daniel Jordan Skit"
14.	"Beautiful Girl"
15.	"Let The System Bump"
16.	"Another Flight"
17.	"Death Of An Indie Label"
18.	"Amy Winehouse"
19.	"Indubitably"
20.	"Big Thangs"
