= Lamb chop =

Lamb chop or Lambchop may refer to:

- Meat chop of lamb
  - Lamb meat
- Lamb Chop (puppet), a sock puppet sheep created by Shari Lewis and now played by her daughter Mallory
  - Lamb Chop's Play-Along!, the television series featuring the puppet
- Lambchop (band), an American alternative-country group
- Lamb Chop (horse) (1960-1964), an American Thoroughbred racehorse
- Lambchops (film), a 1929 Burns and Allen comedy short film
- Lamb Chopz, an EP by Esham
