= The 40 Made Me Do It =

Studio album by Dice
- Released: 1992
- Genres: Gangsta rap; Midwest hip hop
- Labels: World One Records; Raw Dogg Records

Dice chronology
The 40 Made Me Do It (1992)	The Neighborhoodshittalka (1996)

The 40 Made Me Do It is the debut album of Detroit rapper Dice. Released in 1992 by World One Records, the album was distributed by Raw Dogg Records. Extensive touring with Ultramagnetic MCs, Ice Cube and Da Lench Mob led to this album being a success, and Dice released his next album, The Neighborhoodshittalka, with Reel Life Productions.

== Track listing ==
No.	Title	Length
1.	"Craptable (Intro)"	0:42
2.	"Niggas Don't Know"	3:58
3.	"Mafia Queen"	2:58
4.	"Holdontomy D!"	3:38
5.	"Ya Woman IZ Fuckin'"	1:39
6.	"Past the 40"	4:48
7.	"Homie Don't"	3:54
8.	"Daddy Longstroke"	3:57
9.	"Smoketown U.S.A."	1:06
10.	"Shoot Da Boosters"	1:15
11.	"Head 2 Bed"	3:22
12.	"Mr. Bowinko"	3:41
13.	"Twas the Night"	0:45
14.	"Caught Up in a Game"	2:14
15.	"760 A.D."	4:01
16.	"No Answer"	0:20
17.	"Eyes of a Blind Man"	3:32
Total length:		46:24
