= No Rest for the Wicked =

No Rest for the Wicked may refer to:

- A proverb from the Book of Isaiah which has developed a humorous secular meaning in addition to the original biblical meaning

== Music ==
=== Albums ===
- No Rest for the Wicked (AZ Chike album) (2026)
- No Rest for the Wicked (Helix album) (1983)
- No Rest for the Wicked (New Model Army album) (1985)
- No Rest for the Wicked (Ozzy Osbourne album) (1988)
- No Rest for the Wicked, a 1992 album by Mentallo and the Fixer

=== Songs ===
- "No Rest for the Wicked" (song), a 2014 song by Lykke Li from I Never Learn
- "No Rest for the Wicked", a 1982 song by Nomeansno from Mama
- "No Rest for the Wicked", a 1995 song by Cypress Hill from Cypress Hill III: Temples of Boom
- "No Rest for the Wicked", a 1995 song by Leæther Strip from Legacy of Hate and Lust
- "No Rest for the Wicked", a 1995 song by Bloodhound Gang from Use Your Fingers
- "No Rest for the Wicked", a 2006 song by Godsmack from IV
- "No Rest for the Wicked", a 2010 song by (hed) p.e. from Truth Rising
- "No Rest for the Wicked", a 2011 song by a Hawk and a Hacksaw from Cervantine
- "No Rest for the Wicked", a 2011 song by Saxon from Call to Arms
- "No Rest for the Wicked", a 2016 song by Yngwie Malmsteen from World on Fire

== Other uses ==
- No Rest for the Wicked (2011 film), a Spanish film
- No Rest for the Wicked (2026 film), a Danish film
- No Rest for the Wicked (webcomic), a webcomic by Andrea L. Peterson
- "No Rest for the Wicked" (Supernatural), a 2008 episode of Supernatural
- No Rest for the Wicked, a novel by Kresley Cole
- No Rest for the Wicked (video game), a video game by Moon Studios

== See also ==
- "Ain't No Rest for the Wicked", a 2008 song by Cage the Elephant
- "No Peace for the Wicked", a 1975 episode of TV sitcom Porridge
- "No Peace for the Wicked", a 1978 song by Rory Gallagher from Defender
- "No Peace for the Wicked", a 1984 song by Thompson Twins from Into the Gap
- "No Rest 4 The Wicket", a 2009 song by Esham from I Ain't Cha Homey
