= Hellaween: Pure Horror =

Mixtape by Esham
- Released: October 13, 2009
- Recorded: 2009
- Genre: Midwest hip hop, horrorcore, indie hip hop
- Label: RLP/Gothom
- Producer: Esham, Essman, Daniel Jordan, Poe Whosaine, Doyem

Esham chronology
The Butcher Shop (2009)	Hellaween: Pure Horror (2009)	Death of an Indie Label (2011)

Hellaween: Pure Horror is the second mixtape presented by Esham A. Smith. Released on October 13, 2009, it is a concept album inspired by multiple horror films and the radio drama format of programs such as The War of the Worlds.

== Track listing ==
No.	Title	Artist(s)	Length
1.	"Jack Lantern"	Esham	6:01
2.	"The Mummy"	Esham	4:31
3.	"Invisible Man"	Esham	2:58
4.	"You Wouldn't Like Me When I'm Angry"	Esham	1:28
5.	"Attack of the Blob"	Esham	3:46
6.	"Evil Dead"	Daniel Jordan	1:40
7.	"Freddy Krueger"	Doc Hollywood Hustle	1:03
8.	"Se7en"	Kagah	1:32
9.	"Dr. Jekyll and Mr Hyde"	King Solomon	3:55
10.	"Ghetto Werewolf"	Esham	3:51
11.	"Do You Like Me?"	Esham	2:07
12.	"Pinhead"	Mastamind	1:25
13.	"Seed of Chucky"	Poe Whosaine	1:35
14.	"Van Helsing"	Daniel Jordan	2:50
15.	"Frankenstein"	Esham	2:11
16.	"Zombieland"	Esham	2:52
17.	"Michael Myers"	Esham	4:56
Total length:			48:06
