= Dog shit =

Dog shit or Dogshit may refer to:

- Feces expelled from dogs
- "Dog Shit", a song by Wu-Tang Clan from their 1997 album Wu-Tang Forever
- "Dog Shit", a song by 21 Savage from his 2025 album What Happened to the Streets?
- Detroit Dogshit, 1997 compilation album by rapper Esham
- "Dogshit" a term used to call out poorly made things (such as: games, movies, products)
