= Erotic Poetry =

EP by Esham
- Released: April 15, 1991
- Length: 16:28
- Label: Reel Life Productions
- Producer: Esham, Mike Clark

Esham chronology
Erotic Poetry (1991)	Homey Don't Play (1991)

Professional ratings
Review scores
Source	Rating
AllMusic	link

Erotic Poetry, released in 1991, is the first extended play (EP) album by Esham A. Smith. It followed his 1989 LP album Boomin' Words from Hell, as his second release overall. Much like Boomin' Words from Hell, an earlier version was released including alternative artwork and instrumentals, however it was released in limited numbers and is considered a collector's item by Esham fans.

== Track listing ==
No.	Title	Length
1.	"Erotic Poetry"	4:42
2.	"The Jaw Bone!"	4:16
3.	"The Real Feel"	4:34
4.	"Pleaze"	3:36
Total length:		16:28
