= Dead Flowers =

Dead Flowers may refer to:

- Dead Flowers, a 1990s New Zealand band signed to Wildside Records
- "Dead Flowers" (Miranda Lambert song), a 2009 song by Miranda Lambert
- "Dead Flowers" (Rolling Stones song), a 1971 song by the Rolling Stones

== See also ==
- Dead Flowerz, an album by Esham
