= The Butcher Shop =

Mixtape by Esham
- Released: March 25, 2008
- Recorded: 2008
- Genre: Midwest hip hop, hardcore hip hop, horrorcore, indie hip hop
- Label: Reel Life Productions
- Producer: Esham

Esham chronology
The Butcher Shop (2008)	Hellaween: Pure Horror (2009)

The Butcher Shop is the first mixtape presented by rapper Esham. Released in 2008, the album contains tracks from Detroit rappers such as Big Herk, L.A.R.S., Insane Clown Posse, Royce da 5'9" and Trick Trick. The album also features the entirety of Esham's extended play Lamb Chopz, previously released as a digital download on October 30, 2007. The Butcher Shop peaked at #86 on the Billboard Top R&B/Hip-Hop Albums chart.

== Track listing ==
No.	Title	Performer(s)	Length
1.	"Lamb Chopz"	Esham	1:45
2.	"American Psycho"	Esham	2:28
3.	"Deadbeat Mom"	Esham	3:22
4.	"Forgot About E"	Esham	1:37
5.	"Mr. Honeynut Cheerioz"	Esham	2:12
6.	"I Got Flow"	Esham	2:45
7.	"Reel Life"	Mastamind	2:59
8.	"?????"	L.A.R.S. ft. Esham	3:51
9.	"Monster"	Poe Whosaine	3:17
10.	"Global Warming"	Insane Clown Posse	4:20
11.	"The Game Got Rules"	Big Herk	4:08
12.	"What You Sayin'"	Stretch Money	4:15
13.	"What It Is"	East Side Chedda Boy Malik	3:45
14.	"Gunfire"	Supa Emcee	3:08
15.	"On Fire"	Doc Hollywood Hustle	3:01
16.	"Pussy Connoisseur"	Don Mel	2:57
17.	"Count the Money"	Filthy Rockwell	3:34
18.	"90 Degreez"	Lil Mike Mike	3:50
19.	"Hustle Hard"	Dinky Dawson ft. Trick Trick	4:02
20.	"Black Orchid" (Remix)	Bossalini ft. Esham	4:22
21.	"Pussy Good"	Drunken Master ft. Esham and Royce da 5'9"	4:27
22.	"So Far Gone"	Street Lord Juan	4:01
23.	"Still Don't"	East Side Chedda Boy Tuff Tone	3:55
Total length:			77:58
