= Lamb Chopz =

EP by Esham
- Released: October 30, 2007
- Label: RLP/Gothom
- Producer: Esham

Esham chronology
Maggot Brain Theory (1994)	Lamb Chopz (2007)	I Ain't Cha Homey (2009)

Lamb Chopz is the fifth extended play by Esham A. Smith, released as a digital download. The EP's six tracks were incorporated into the 2008 mixtape The Butcher Shop.

== Track listing ==
No.	Title	Length
1.	"Lamb Chopz"	1:45
2.	"American Psycho"	2:28
3.	"Deadbeat Mom"	3:22
4.	"Forgot About E"	1:37
5.	"Mr. Honeynut Cheerioz"	2:12
6.	"I Got Flow"	2:45
Total length:		14:09
