= DMT Sessions =

Studio album by Esham
- Released: June 21, 2011
- Genre: Hip hop
- Length: 67:06
- Label: Reel Life
- Producers: Skywlkr; Abjo and Pitchbull

Esham chronology
Suspended Animation (2010)	DMT Sessions (2011)	Venus Fly Trap LP (2012)

Singles from DMT Sessions
- 1. "DMT Sessions" Released: May 17, 2011

DMT Sessions is the fourteenth studio album by Esham.

== Release ==
The album was released on June 21, 2011. A deluxe edition was announced, which was supposed to feature bonus tracks and a documentary entitled Death of an Indie Label, but the documentary and the bonus track "Comatose" were instead uploaded to Gothom Inc.'s YouTube channel.

== Track listing ==
No.	Title	Length
1.	"Oooooooooooohhhhhwwwwwwweeeeeeeeeee!!!"	3:53
2.	"DMT Sessions" (featuring Danny Brown)	3:10
3.	"Valhalla Rising"	4:47
4.	"China White"	2:02
5.	"Lysergic Acid Diethylamide"	3:25
6.	"Oxycontin"	4:31
7.	"Clonazepam"	3:36
8.	"Sildenafil Citrate"	3:44
9.	"Skrewberry Kush"	3:12
10.	"Codeine Phosphate Promethazine"	2:05
11.	"Scante" (featuring Mastamind)	3:39
12.	"Psilocybin"	2:44
13.	"A-thujone"	1:32
14.	"Phencyclidine"	4:27
15.	"Yellow Jackets"	3:10
16.	"Methylenedioxymethamphetamine"	3:33
17.	"Lophophora Williams II"	1:40
18.	"Dimethyltryptamine"	5:13
19.	"Jack3d"	2:54
20.	"Coma"	3:49
Total length:		67:06
