= Repentance (Esham album) =

Studio album by Esham
- Released: November 18, 2003
- Length: 61:22
- Label: Psychopathic
- Producer: Esham

Esham chronology
Tongues (2001)	Repentance (2003)	A-1 Yola (2005)

Singles from Repentance
- 1. "Woo Woo Woo" Released: 2003

Professional ratings
Review scores
Source	Rating
Allrovi	3/5 stars

Repentance is the ninth studio album by Esham. Released in 2003, it is his first album of new material to be released on Psychopathic Records, and his second album on the label overall, after the compilation Acid Rain.

== Lyrics and music ==
Because much of Smith's most well-known material had contained lyrics that were Satanic in nature, he had long been accused of Satanism and had long attempted to shed such perceptions. Repentance was produced as an attempt to "set the [...] record straight" and leave his former "Unholy" stage persona behind him. The album was originally announced under the title Redemption.

The song "Woo Woo Woo Woo" was released as a single, and a music video for the song was filmed by Roy Knyrim. In both instances, the song is identified as "Woo Woo Woo", even though it is referred to as "Woo Woo Woo Woo" on the album itself, and in the chorus. Although the video aired in rotation on BET and MTV 2, Esham decided to direct his own music videos because he disliked the way this video turned out.

== Reception ==
Repentance peaked at #9 on the Top Heatseekers chart, #10 on the Top Independent Albums chart, and #71 on the Top R&B/Hip-Hop Albums chart. In his review of the album, Allrovi's Jason Birchmeier wrote that "Repentance is a small step forward for Esham. He seems very confident here, comfortable with himself as an artist" and that "when he pulls everything together [...] he makes some of the best music of his long, fruitful, yet largely unacknowledged career."

(All songs written by Esham except tracks 6, 8 and 14, which were written by Puwal)

== Track listing ==
#	Title	Featured guest(s)	Length
1	Bang		3:18
2	Can't Take That		2:49
3	Woo Woo Woo Woo		3:26
4	Pay	Bone Thugs-n-Harmony	3:55
5	No More Dyin'		2:55
6	Soopa Doopa	Soopa Villainz	2:05
7	Back in da Day		4:09
8	Mommy		2:21
9	Hard Times	Insane Clown Posse	3:09
10	Ex-Girlfriend		2:55
11	Look at Me	Twiztid	2:38
12	Brick	TNT	2:59
13	Get Doe		1:59
14	Boom!	Violent J	3:26
15	In Detroit	TNT	2:50
16	Boss Up		3:25
17	Out Cold		2:34
18	Dem Boyz	Violent J	3:37
19	No War	Jumpsteady	3:19
20	All of My Life		3:33

== Personnel ==
- Esham – performer
- Mike Puwal – guitar

== Production ==
- Producer: Esham
- Engineers: Esham, Fritz "the Cat" Van Kosky, Mike P.
- Mixing: Esham, Fritz "the Cat" Van Kosky, Mike P.
- Arranger: Esham

== Charts ==
Album - Billboard (North America)

Year	Chart	Position
2003	Top Heatseekers	9
2003	Top Independent Albums	10
2003	Top R&B/Hip-Hop Albums	71

=== Singles ===
Year	Song	U.S. Hot 100	U.S. R&B	U.S. Rap	Album
2003	"Woo Woo Woo"	-	-	-	Repentance
