= Red Rain (album) =

Studio album by Dice
- Released: 2002
- Genres: Gangsta rap; Midwest hip hop; horrorcore
- Label: Fallen Angelz Entertainment

Dice chronology
Black Monday (2000)	Red Rain (2002)	Drug Abuse (2008)

Red Rain is the fourth album by Detroit rapper Dice, released in 2002 by Fallen Angelz Entertainment. On October 31, 2006, the album was reissued with a second disc, Evil Angelz Runnin Thru Hell.

== Production ==
After recording the album, Dice claims that Fallen Angelz founder Russell Colvin took his name off the Fallen Angelz ownership papers and did not fairly compensate him for his service: "I gave Dice $10,000 in advance and was broke 2 months later". Colvin claims that Dice agreed to put up $30,000 to bankroll the label, but never came up with his half.

== Track listing ==
Red Rain
No.	Title	Length
1.	"Entro/Red Rain"	3:40
2.	"Apt. 3, Pt. 3" (featuring Razzaq)	4:49
3.	"Spiritual Warfare"	3:56
4.	"Apt. 3, Pt. 4" (featuring Razzaq)	4:21
5.	"Smoketown USA 2006/Han-Out Skit 1"	2:40
6.	"Cocaine [Remix]"	4:03
7.	"So Many Rainy Dayz" (featuring Debbie Wright)	3:51
8.	"Yae Yo" (featuring Kweenie Lox)	4:28
9.	"Whut'z Really Goin Down" (featuring Supa MC)	3:14
10.	"Nemphomaniac" (Razzaq solo)	4:33
11.	"Baby Daddy"	3:09
12.	"Dice"	4:04
13.	"Neighborhood Watch"	2:41
14.	"Apt. 3, Pt. 5 (Son of a Junkie)"	3:46

Evil Angelz Runnin Thru Hell
No.	Title	Length
1.	"Entro/Death Angelz"	1:36
2.	"Tha World on Fire"	4:39
3.	"Punish tha Wicket Skit 1"	0:39
4.	"Shattered Dreamz"	4:38
5.	"N tha Ghetto"	3:00
6.	"Dead Manz Dream"	3:44
7.	"I Don't Want 2 Die Skit 2"	0:30
8.	"Life Iz Parallel 2 Hell"	3:32
9.	"E.A.R.T.H."	3:41
10.	"Angel Fernandez"	4:44
11.	"Blessed But Cursed"	2:58
12.	"Phuck Yo LP"	4:00
13.	"Mother'z Call"	3:38
14.	"Gimme Whut U Got"	3:57
15.	"Fallen Angelz, Pt. 2"	4:10
16.	"Me & My Nigguz"	3:39
17.	"Tha Illest"	0:44
18.	"Outro"	2:58
19.	"Crack in the Wall"	2:42
20.	"Sum Old Wicketshit"	5:45
21.	"Screaming"	4:01

iTunes track listing
No.	Title	Length
1.	"Entro"	3:42
2.	"Apt. 3 Pt. 3" (featuring Razzaq)	4:51
3.	"Spiritual Warfare"	3:58
4.	"Apt. 3 Pt. 4" (featuring Razzaq)	4:23
5.	"Cocaine (Remix)"	4:05
6.	"So Many Rainy Dayz" (featuring Debbie Wright)	3:53
7.	"Yea Yo" (feat. Kweenie Lox)	4:30
8.	"Whutz Really Goin Down" (featuring Supa MC)	3:16
9.	"Nemphomaniac" (Razzaq solo)	4:34
Total length:		37:12
