= Mail Dominance =

Studio album by Esham
- Released: March 2, 1999
- Genre: Hardcore hip-hop
- Length: 65:39
- Label: Overcore
- Producers: Esham; Santos

Esham chronology
Bruce Wayne: Gothom City 1987 (1997)	Mail Dominance (1999)	Tongues (2001)

Singles from Mail Dominance
- 1. "Twirk Yo Body" Released: 1999

Professional ratings
Review scores
Source	Rating
AllMusic	2/5 stars
The Source	2.5/5 stars

Mail Dominance is the seventh studio album by the American rapper Esham, released in 1999.

== Critical reception ==
AllMusic wrote that "Unfortunately, on Mail Dominance it's not his delivery or flow that seems questionable but rather his lyrics and the production. When not rapping about nihilistic themes, Esham struggles to find engaging lyrics; here he's best when he raps indecipherably." The Village Voice thought that "it’s intermittently irritating or annoying—the production is mega-chintzy, and boy does he hate women (hook of 'Ozonelayer': 'You bitch/you bitch/you bitch you bitch you bitch you bitch you bitch')—but it doesn’t get anywhere near boring, or overfamiliar." The Windsor Star opined that the album "provides more musical variety than most radio stations, with rap, dance, rock and even corny '50s- sitcom-influenced tracks." Miguel Burke of The Source praised Esham's "tight flow", but was dissatisfied with the lyrical content of the album and "strange production", with some of the tracks reminding him the soundtracks of "cheesy futuristic flicks from '70s and '80s like Rollerball and Tron".

== Track listing ==
No.	Title	Writer(s)	Length
1.	"We Cumin' for U"	Smith	2:14
2.	"Slow Motion"	Santos; Smith	3:14
3.	"Outcha Atmosphere"	Santos; Smith	3:41
4.	"E-Mail"	Jones; Smith	2:50
5.	"Reload"	Smith	1:23
6.	"Au Revoir"	Jones; Reed; Santos; Smith	3:44
7.	"I'm Lovin It"	Santos; Smith	2:29
8.	"Youknowucantride"	Smith	3:57
9.	"King of Hearts"	Santos; Smith	4:04
10.	"Whoa"	Smith; Santos	1:57
11.	"Obiest"	Santos; Smith	3:01
12.	"Twirk Yo Body"	Santos; Smith	3:32
13.	"Night Vision"	Santos; Smith	3:58
14.	"Getthefugoutmyface"	Smith	3:16
15.	"Ozone Layer"	Jones; Smith	2:36
16.	"I Need A Playmate"	Smith; Santos	4:27
17.	"Lightyearsaway"	Santos; Smith	1:22
18.	"California Dreamin'"	Santos; Smith	3:59
19.	"No More Mr. Nice Guy"	Smith	2:13
20.	"Velveeta"	Smith	2:23
21.	"The Rev"	Smith	2:54
22.	"Ah Ha"	Santos; Smith	2:45
Total length:			65:59

== Personnel ==
- Esham - performer
- Sue Gillis - background vocals
- Mastamind - vocals
- TNT - vocals
- Laura Ruby - background vocals
- Larry Santos - background vocals
- Scott Santos - background vocals
- Jade Scott - performer
- Zelah Williams - background vocals

== Production ==
- Producers: Esham, Santos
- Engineers: Esham, Santos
- Mastering: Esham, Santos
- Graphic design: Matthew Kozuch-Rea
