= N of tha World =

Studio album by Natas
- Released: January 24, 2006
- Genre: Hip hop
- Length: 58:22
- Label: RLP/Gothom/Warlock
- Producer: Esham

Natas chronology
Godlike (2002)	N of tha World (2006)	FUQERRBDY (2014)

Alternative cover

Professional ratings
Review scores
Source	Rating
About.com	4/5 stars

N of tha World is the seventh studio album by Natas. Released in 2006, it was the group's first album released by Reel Life Productions since 1999's WicketWorldWide.COM, although there were claims that there was no newly recorded material by Natas, which broke up in 2002. Five songs on the album were newly recorded after Esham departed from Psychopathic Records in October 2005; the rest of the album consists of material recorded by Esham and T-N-T for a prospective Esham album, to be titled Club Evil, that never came out. Despite the album being attributed to Natas, the only track by the group is N of tha World. The other four new songs were "World's Apart", "On My Own", "Trouble & Pain" and "Niggaz Always Talkin' Alot of Shit".

== Music and lyrics ==
N of tha World features live instrumentation and loops which derive from blues, funk and hard rock. "See You In Hell" is built around a sample of the Muddy Waters song "Tom Cat", from his 1968 psychedelic concept album Electric Mud. "Why You Gotta Lie" samples the drum break from Aerosmith and Run-DMC's "Walk This Way" and the chord progression of Metallica's "Enter Sandman".

The album's lyrics focus on topics ranging from women and violence to spirituality. Natas expresses self-reliance and allegiance to God. However, Esham refers to himself once again as "The Unholy" on the album in material recorded prior to signing with Psychopathic, a moniker he had not used since the song "Enjoy Life" from the 2003 Bedlam album "Bedlamitez Rize".

== Reception ==
About.com reviewed the album favorably, writing "Great, great stuff that I personally will drop on the many I meet daily that are starved for proper hip-hop."

== Track listing ==
No.	Title	Performer(s)	Length
1.	"Intro"		1:11
2.	"Once Upon a Time"	Esham, T-N-T	2:50
3.	"Dead Men Don't Sing"	Esham, T-N-T	3:43
4.	"Worlds Apart"	Esham, T-N-T, The Brian Schram Band	4:36
5.	"Long as I Live"	Esham, T-N-T	4:11
6.	"Pancakes & Syrup"	Esham, T-N-T	4:42
7.	"Full of Hate"	T-N-T, Esham	3:11
8.	"Nightmares"	Esham, T-N-T	4:08
9.	"On My Own"	Esham	3:25
10.	"Trouble & Pain"	Esham, Doc "Hollywood" Hustle, Moebadis	4:27
11.	"N of tha World"	Esham, T-N-T, Mastamind	5:33
12.	"See You in Hell"	Esham, T-N-T	3:08
13.	"?"	Esham	3:05
14.	"Crazytown"	T-N-T	2:49
15.	"Niggaz Always Talkin' Alot of Sh*t"	Esham, T-N-T	4:02
16.	"Why You Gotta Lie"	Esham, T-N-T, Syn of Zug Izland	3:21
Total length:			58:22

== Personnel ==
- Esham the Unholy a.k.a. Black Hitler — rapping
- T-N-T a.k.a. The Dynamite Kid — rapping
- Mastamind a.k.a. Mr. Hellraiser — rapping

=== Musicians ===
- Mike P. — lead guitar
- Randy (The Leer Jet Engineer Fixin') Lynch — lead guitar on "Pancakes & Syrup" and "On My Own"
- The Brian Schram Band — instrumentation on ("Worlds Apart")

=== Production ===
- Esham — producer, executive producer
- Young Kyle for Blackstone — A&R exec
- Mike P. — additional technical support
- Eric Saunders — cover art
- Michael Broom — drawings
