= Multikillionaire: The Devil's Contract =

Studio album by Natas
- Released: October 28, 1997
- Genre: Hip hop
- Length: 72:46
- Label: Reel Life/Gothom

Natas chronology
Doubelievengod (1995)	Multikillionaire: The Devil's Contract (1997)	WicketWorldWide.COM (1999)

Professional ratings
Review scores
Source	Rating
Allrovi	3/5 stars

Multikillionaire: The Devil's Contract is the fourth album by Natas, released in 1997. This album is noted as the only release to feature Moebadis as the fourth member of the group (although he eventually made a guest appearance on Natas' 2006 album N of tha World).

== Music and lyrics ==
Allrovi wrote that the musical style of Multikillionaire: The Devil's Contract is a fusion of "Funkadelic guitar funk and Def Jam-era Rick Rubin-influenced beats". Regarding the album's lyrical content, Allrovi wrote "the group doesn't rely so much on perverse sex, morbid obsessions, or heretical talk but rather attitude here to make their music interesting."

== Reception ==
Allrovi reviewer Jason Birchmeier wrote that "This album isn't as realized as WWW.COM, but it's closer than any preceding Natas album."

== Track listing ==
No.	Title	Writer(s)	Length
1.	"Be Careful What U Wish"	Mastamind, Esham	2:56
2.	"We All Die"	Mastamind, Esham, T-N-T, Moebadis	3:16
3.	"Nation of Killas"	Mastamind, Esham	2:33
4.	"Multikillionaire"	Mastamind	3:12
5.	"Ballerz Envy (feat. Billy Bathgate)"	Mastamind, Esham, Bathgate	2:49
6.	"Don't Gimme No H.A.N. / ?"	Mastamind, Esham, T-N-T, Moebadis	8:53
7.	"Oh My God?"	T-N-T	2:00
8.	"The Devil's Contract"	Mastamind, Esham, T-N-T	7:39
9.	"All My Dogs"	Mastamind	4:11
10.	"All Sacrifices Made (feat. R. Blevans)"	Mastamind, Esham, Moebadis, Blevans	3:49
11.	"Walk On Water (feat. Big Los)"	Mastamind, Esham, T-N-T, Los	3:24
12.	"Trick Masta"	Mastamind	3:02
13.	"2breast and 1biscuit"	Mastamind, Esham, T-N-T	2:51
14.	"All Praises Due"	Mastamind, Esham, T-N-T	2:38
15.	"E.Z. (feat. Doc Hollywood Hustle)"	Mastamind, Esham, Brooks	3:47
16.	"Distortion"	Mastamind, Esham	2:47
17.	"Last Breath"	Mastamind, Esham	2:39
18.	"Price On Ya Head"	Esham	3:11
19.	"Blessed But Cursed"	Mastamind	3:50
20.	"Record Deal"	Mastamind, Esham	3:19
Total length:			72:46
