= Suspended Animation (Esham album) =

Album by Esham

Studio album by Esham
- Released: August 3, 2010
- Label: Reel Life
- Producer: Esham

Esham chronology
Sacrificial Lambz (2008)	Suspended Animation (2010)	DMT Sessions (2011)

Singles from Suspended Animation
- 1. "SSMD" Released: April 13, 2010

Suspended Animation is the twelfth studio album by Esham. It was released on August 3, 2010 on Reel Life Productions. On December 7, Esham released a follow-up EP, Subatomic Jetpack. It was not an extended version of the album, but a standalone disc containing 32 additional tracks from the recording sessions.

== Track listing ==
Suspended Animation
No.	Title	Length
1.	"All the Time"	2:54
2.	"Closed Doors"	2:31
3.	"Subatomic" (featuring King Solomon)	2:50
4.	"Ronald McDonald"	1:47
5.	"SSMD"	3:31
6.	"Suspended Animation"	2:11
7.	"Triggernometry"	2:59
8.	"Designer Drugs"	1:33
9.	"Rlp Logo"	2:32
10.	"??????"	0:21
11.	"You Don't Luv Me"	2:41
12.	"Electromagnetic"	2:47
13.	"Horrible"	2:16
14.	"Poultry"	2:18
15.	"Sinsory Deprivation"	3:12
16.	"Get a Room"	2:40
17.	"U Can Die"	2:27
18.	"Private Hotel Party"	2:53
19.	"Worst Place 2 Be"	2:46
20.	"Killa P*$$y"	1:39
21.	"American Made"	2:28
22.	"??????"	0:42
23.	"Don't Wake Me Up"	2:25
24.	"Gumball 3000"	2:05
25.	"Thanx"	1:50
26.	"But No Thanx"	4:57
27.	"Police" (featuring Daniel Jordan)	3:18
28.	"How Come"	3:45
29.	"Home"	3:10
Total length:		73:28

Subatomic Jetpack
No.	Title	Length
1.	"Funny Feelin'"	2:40
2.	"24 HRS"	2:07
3.	"Wit Out A Band"	1:44
4.	"Deadboy Anubis Wisdom"	0:41
5.	"Go 2 Sleep"	2:38
6.	"What My Name Is"	1:06
7.	"Dr Conrad Murray"	2:15
8.	"Krazy People"	2:54
9.	"Ring Around The Rosie" (featuring Mastamind)	2:21
10.	"Godspeed"	2:02
11.	"God Bless The Feigns"	2:47
12.	"Attention" (featuring Daniel Jordan)	1:38
13.	"Money Bitch"	2:56
14.	"7 Mile Cruzin"	3:56
15.	"BLMNHM"	2:29
16.	"Nasty Hoe"	1:44
17.	"Mastamind"	1:20
18.	"Saints And Sinners"	3:56
19.	"All Over Wit"	1:06
20.	"Start Strippin"	4:52
21.	"Salty Krackers"	1:16
22.	"Stupid"	1:17
23.	"Put On My Cult"	2:11
24.	"Firstcheck"	3:35
25.	"DET"	1:08
26.	"Eminem"	2:07
27.	"So Suicidal" (featuring Mastamind)	4:22
28.	"Pledge"	2:32
29.	"Get Rich"	0:58
30.	"Buyout"	2:07
31.	"Invitation"	2:45
32.	"Street Corner"	2:50
Total length:		74:20

== Personnel ==
=== Musicians ===
- Esham A. Smith - performer, executive producer
- Daniel Jordan - performer
- King Solomon - performer
- Ruin Your Life - live instrumentation, production
  - Tony Raines
  - Ryan C.
  - Skeels
  - Tony Butchart

=== Other personnel ===
- Deadboy (Anubis Wisdom) - spiritual guidance
- Eric Morgeson - mastering
- Todd Pearl - cover artwork
- Phil Feist - venture capital investor
- Filthy Rockwell - production
- Essman - production
- Pitchbull - production
- Kuttmah - production
- Villain Accelerate - production
