= Godlike (Natas album) =

Studio album by Natas
- Released: May 21, 2002
- Genre: Hip hop
- Length: 1:00:26
- Label: Number 6 Records
- Producer: Esham

Natas chronology
WicketWorldWide.COM (1999)	Godlike (2002)	N of tha World (2006)

Godlike is the sixth studio album by American hip hop group Natas from Detroit, Michigan. It was released on May 21, 2002, via Number 6 Records, making it the group's first album to be released on a label other than Reel Life Productions, and its only release on Number 6 Records. Production was handled solely by Esham. The album peaked at #56 on the US Billboard Top R&B/Hip-Hop Albums chart, #35 on the Independent Albums chart, and #45 on the Heatseekers Albums chart.

== Track listing ==
All music is composed by Esham.

No.	Title	Performer(s)	Length
1.	"Godlike"	Esham, T-N-T, Mastamind	2:56
2.	"Thatz What"	Esham, Mastamind, T-N-T	2:13
3.	"Make Me Feel Better"	Mastamind, T-N-T, Esham	4:45
4.	"Bloody 'Em Up"	Esham, Mastamind, T-N-T	2:39
5.	"When Will I See Your Face Again"	Mastamind, T-N-T, Esham	2:59
6.	"How Could U"	Mastamind, T-N-T, Esham	2:58
7.	"Get Mo' Cheddar"	Esham, T-N-T, Mastamind	3:20
8.	"Tell 'Em Something"	Esham, Mastamind, T-N-T	4:28
9.	"They Know"	Mastamind	3:25
10.	"My Eyes Don't Cry"	Esham, T-N-T, Mastamind	3:04
11.	"Halatosis"	T-N-T	2:26
12.	"Shady MF"	T-N-T, Esham, Mastamind	2:41
13.	"It Ain't All About U"	Esham	2:52
14.	"Can Get Kilt 4 This"	Esham, T-N-T, Mastamind	2:10
15.	"N-A-T-A-S"	Mastamind, T-N-T, Esham	3:18
16.	"Bitches I Want to Fuck"	Esham, T-N-T	2:31
17.	"Tonight"	Esham, T-N-T	2:08
18.	"Blackvote"	T-N-T, Esham, Mastamind	3:10
19.	"When U Hit Ya Lowz"	Esham, Mastamind, T-N-T	2:54
20.	"See Thru"	Mastamind, Esham, T-N-T	3:30
Total length:			1:00:26

== Personnel ==
- Esham Attica Smith – performer (tracks: 1–8, 10, 12–20), producer
- Gary Reed – performer (tracks: 1–10, 12, 14–15, 18–20)
- TNT – performer (tracks: 1–8, 10–12, 14–20)

== Charts ==
Chart (2002)	Peak position
US Top R&B/Hip-Hop Albums (Billboard)	56
US Independent Albums (Billboard)	35
US Heatseekers Albums (Billboard)	45
