= Drug Abuse (album) =

Studio album by Dice
- Released: 2008
- Genres: Gangsta rap; Midwest hip hop
- Label: Fallen Angelz Entertainment
- Producer: Dice

Dice chronology
Red Rain (2002)	Drug Abuse (2008)	Sick Tapez Vol 1: Mor Fein (2013)

Drug Abuse is the fifth album released by Detroit rapper Dice on Fallen Angelz Entertainment. Dice tried to illegally release this album, outside of his contract with Fallen Angelz, but was unsuccessful as Fallen Angelz were in possession of the master tapes.

== Track listing ==
No.	Title	Length
1.	"Drug Dealer"
2.	"I Sell Drugz"	3:15
3.	"Dice Iz King"	3:27
4.	"Abusing Drugz"	4:10
5.	"Love Storey"	3:21
6.	"I Got Bitches"	3:52
7.	"Daddy"	3:56
8.	"Dear God"	3:05
9.	"My 1st Luv"	5:30
10.	"Gangsta"	3:17
11.	"Dare He Go"	3:42
Total length:		37:35
