= Doubelievengod =

Studio album by Natas
- Released: July 25, 1995
- Recorded: 1994–1995
- Genre: Hip-hop
- Length: 57:18
- Label: Reel Life
- Producer: Esham

Natas chronology
Blaz4me (1994)	Doubelievengod (1995)	Multikillionaire: The Devil's Contract (1997)

Professional ratings
Review scores
Source	Rating
Allrovi	4/5 stars

Doubelievengod is the third album by rap duo, Natas, released in 1995.

== Music and lyrics ==
Describing the music and lyrics, Allrovi called Doubelievengod "a much more mature album in terms of both production and rapping. Most obviously, the platter of samples is gone; for whatever reasons, the emphasis is now on synth-driven beats [...] The move toward eerie synth actually works in this album's favor, given its malevolent slant and ominous tone".

== Reception ==
Allrovi reviewer Jason Birchmeier proclaimed that Doubelievengod "holds a special place in the Esham legacy alongside the Judgement Day albums as the summit of not necessarily his talent but rather his wickedness."

== Track listing ==
All tracks produced by Esham

No.	Title	Length
1.	"Doubelievengod"	3:29
2.	"NATAS"	3:20
3.	"Pop Pop"	3:49
4.	"Midnight" (Esham solo)	3:20
5.	"Itzalright" (T-N-T solo)	2:47
6.	"Can I R.I.P."	1:48
7.	"Torture" (performed by Esham & Dice)	2:11
8.	"We Almost Lost Detroit"	3:48
9.	"Heaven" (Mastamind solo)	3:49
10.	"I Don't Care"	2:37
11.	"Scream" (Esham solo)	3:18
12.	"Fuck da World" (T-N-T solo)	3:49
13.	"Y'all Will Realize"	2:14
14.	"The Night Is Mine"	2:05
15.	"Sunday School"	3:31
16.	"Mad At the World"	2:52
17.	"Propalactic Tacticz"	3:46
18.	"No Fault Insurance" (Esham solo)	4:45
Total length:		57:18

Sample credits

- "Doubelievengod" contains a sample of "Original Nuttah" as performed by UK Apachi
- "NATAS" contains a sample of "Original Nuttah" as performed by UK Apachi
- "Itzalright" contains a sample of "Black Frost" as performed by Grover Washington, Jr.
- "Can I R.I.P." contains a sample of "It Was a Good Day" as performed by Ice Cube
- "We Almost Lost Detroit" contains a sample of "We Almost Lost Detroit" by Gil Scott-Heron
- "Sunday School" contains a sample of "Groove With You" as performed by The Isley Brothers
