= A-1 Yola (Esham album) =

Studio album by Esham
- Released: April 19, 2005
- Studio: The Lotus Pod (Detroit, MI)
- Genre: Hip hop
- Length: 1:00:27
- Label: Psychopathic
- Producer: Esham; Marc Live; Polar Bear

Esham chronology
Repentance (2003)	A-1 Yola (2005)	Sacrificial Lambz (2008)

Professional ratings
Review scores
Source	Rating
AllMusic	2.5/5 stars

A-1 Yola is the tenth solo studio album by American rapper and record producer Esham. It was released on April 19, 2005, through Psychopathic Records, marking the artist's second and final studio album for the label. Recording sessions took place at the Lotus Pod in Detroit. Production was handled by Esham himself, except for two songs produced by Polar Bear and Marc Live. Physical copies of the album were released together with a DVD containing Esham-directed music videos for the majority of its songs.

The album debuted at number 176 on the Billboard 200, number 48 on the Top R&B/Hip-Hop Albums, number 12 on the Independent Albums and number 6 on the Heatseekers Albums in the United States.

== Lyrics and music ==
AllMusic reviewer wrote: "during the course of A-1 Yola, Esham takes the form of street hustler, kingpin, vampire, and all sorts of underworld characters, injecting his undiluted personality into each three-to-four-minute sketch. His sonic backdrop remains raw but fresh, drawing an impressive amount of energy out of sparse beats". According to Esham, he was sent receipts from fans who claimed that the album's bass-heavy sound blew out subwoofers, fried amplifiers and shattered rear windshields.

== Music videos ==
The album came with a bonus DVD which contained music videos for almost all of the album's songs, excluding "Enemies", "Gangsta Dedication" and "?". The video for "Justa Hustler" was reissued on the 2007 Psychopathic Records' DVD Psychopathic: The Videos.

== Track listing ==
All tracks are written by Esham A. Smith.

No.	Title	Producer(s)	Length
1.	"Since Day One"	Esham	3:06
2.	"Turbulence"	Esham	3:37
3.	"Bolivia"	Esham	2:59
4.	"Bird After Bird"	Esham	3:39
5.	"Justa Hustler" (contains the hidden track "Pill Me")	Esham	6:16
6.	"Yoca Cola"	Esham	3:33
7.	"Fall Into The Fire"	Esham	3:14
8.	"Wicket"	Esham	4:03
9.	"Enemies"	Esham	3:12
10.	"Help Me"	Esham	3:15
11.	"Servin'" (contains the hidden track "Full Power")	Esham	3:57
12.	"Bangin' Dope"	Esham	2:40
13.	"One Hundred"	Polar Bear	3:43
14.	"Gangsta Dedication"	Marc Live	3:16
15.	"Unhappy" (contains the hidden track "President")	Esham	3:57
16.	"?"	Esham	2:40
17.	"Smiley Faces"	Esham	3:20
Total length:			1:00:27

== Personnel ==
- Esham A. Smith – lyrics, vocals, producer (tracks: 1–12, 15–17), engineering
- Polar Bear – producer (track 13)
- Marc "Marc Live" Giveand – producer (track 14)

== Charts ==
Chart (2005)	Peak position
US Billboard 200	176
US Top R&B/Hip-Hop Albums (Billboard)	48
US Independent Albums (Billboard)	12
US Heatseekers Albums (Billboard)	6
