= Maggot Brain Theory =

EP by Esham
- Released: May 24, 1994
- Recorded: 1994
- Genre: Horrorcore, underground hip hop
- Length: 14:12
- Label: Reel Life Productions
- Producer: Esham

Esham chronology
Hellterskkkelter (1993)	Maggot Brain Theory (1994)	Lamb Chopz (2007)

Professional ratings
Review scores
Source	Rating
AllMusic	1.5/5 stars

Maggot Brain Theory was released in 1994 and is the fourth extended play by Esham A. Smith.

== Track listing ==
No.	Title	Length
1.	"Comin Out a Coma"	2:35
2.	"Maggot Brain Theory"	2:44
3.	"Traces of My Bloodtype"	2:38
4.	"Stop Diggin on da D-L"	3:26
5.	"I Know You Hate Me"	2:49
Total length:		14:12
