= Dice (rapper) =

American rapper from Detroit, Michigan

- Born: Robert Boyd; October 16, 1970 (age 55)
- Origin: Detroit, Michigan, U.S.
- Genres: Hip hop
- Occupations: Rapper; record producer; music executive
- Years active: 1990–present
- Labels: World One Records; Raw Dogg Records; Reel Life Productions; Fallen Angelz Entertainment

Robert Boyd (born October 16, 1970), known professionally as Dice, is an American rapper and record producer from Detroit, Michigan.

== Biography ==
Dice began his career in 1992, signing with World One Records, who released his debut album, The 40 Made Me Do It through Raw Dogg Records. After touring with Ultramagnetic MCs, Ice Cube and Da Lench Mob, In 1993 Dice began his association with Reel Life Productions, Spring of 1993 Esham came to Dice's mother home to come meet with Dice for possible signing on his independent label which was the biggest selling independent record label out of the midwest, he did not sign a contract with the label. Following appearances on Esham's Closed Casket, Natas' Doubelievengod, Mastamind's EP Lickkuidrano, and later on Esham's Dead Flowerz . Dice released the album The Neighborhoodshittalka on Reel Life in 1996. Dice estimated that the album sold 200,000 copies.

Dice left Reel Life in 1996. 2000 Dice signed as an artist with Fallen Angelz entertainment with Russell Colvin and released the album Black Monday. Fallen Angelz recorded new material to complete the album. After recording another album, Red Rain, with Fallen Angelz, Dice claimed that Colvin took his name off the Fallen Angelz ownership papers after dice failed to put up his 30,000 to become half owner.

In 2008 Dice formed his own label, Big Head Records and released the album Drug Abuse but failed due fallen angelz contract and got the Masters and it was officially released 2011. In 2013, he started a new label called Self Medicated Records which went into a joint venture with producer, record executive Ralpheal "Bigg Reez" Dixon, to release, Morfein also due to illegal issues fallen angelz got the rights. In 2016 Fallen Angelz Entertainment released Dice "Underground Classicks vol.1. 2017 Dice "Evil Angelz Runnin Thru Hell" for the 1st time released on all digital platforms. December 20, 2018 Fallen Angelz Entertainment released Dice "Mentally Destroyed ep" and Dice""Neighborhood Watch" packaged together. 2019 Dice Released his 9th Studio album "Antibioticz".July 4, 2019 Fallen Angelz Entertainment released Dice "Monkey Joe ep".

== Discography ==
- The 40 Made Me Do It (1992)
- The Neighborhoodshittalka (1996)
- Black Monday (2000)
- Red Rain (2002)
- Neighborhood Watch Mixtape (2005)
- Red Rain / Evil Angelz Runnin Thru Hell (2006)
- Drug Abuse (2011)
- MorFein (2013)
- Underground Classicks Vol. 1 (2016)
- Evil Angelz Runnin Thru Hell (2017)
- Mentally Destroyed EP (2018)
- Neighborhood Watch (2018)
- Antibioticz (Monkey Joe Independent) (2019)
- Monkey Joe EP (2019)
