= KKKill the Fetus =

Studio album by Esham
- Released: June 16, 1993
- Recorded: 1992–93
- Genre: Horrorcore
- Length: 72:59
- Label: Reel Life
- Producer: Esham

Esham chronology
Judgement Day (1992)	KKKill the Fetus (1993)	Closed Casket (1994)

Singles from KKKill the Fetus
- 1. "Sunshine" Released: 1993

KKKill the Fetus is the third studio album by Esham. Released in 1993, the album's lyrics focus on subjects such as abortion and murder. The album, which has been cited as an iconic horrorcore album, has been praised for its genre-defining production and lyrics. It is considered to be Esham's critical breakthrough, compared to lackluster reviews of his previous albums. The single "Sunshine" received very heavy radio play nationally. The music video for "Hellterskkkelter" was featured on an episode of Yo! MTV Raps in 1994, and was given out at an autograph signing at Rock of Ages in rare VHS form during the promotional launch.

== Lyrics and music ==
The album's title track encourages drug-addicted pregnant women to have an abortion rather than give birth to their children to be raised improperly. The album's cover depicts a fetus simulating fellatio and thus would be born not only a dope fiend, but also a sex fiend which is why abortion is stressed in the album's title track. Many of the songs are short and heavily sample-based.

== Reception ==
Professional ratings
Review scores
Source	Rating
Allmusic	4.5/5 stars
Sputnikmusic	4/5 stars

In his review of the album, Jason Birchmeier wrote that "At this point in his career, his rapping has already reached near-peak levels, and his production shows a continued path towards an inventiveness. [...] Never again would Esham be so gritty."

In 2009, Fangoria named it as an iconic horrorcore album.

== Track listing ==
All tracks are written by Esham.

No.	Title	Length
1.	"What Is Evil"	2:17
2.	"Symptoms of Insanity"	3:12
3.	"Runnin' From Me!"	1:43
4.	"Voices in My Head"	3:07
5.	"No Singing/Misery"	3:25
6.	"Jackie"	2:37
7.	"Game of Death" (featuring Mastamind and TNT)	4:16
8.	"Headache/Wet Day Dreamer"	2:31
9.	"Hot Booty"	2:59
10.	"I Thought U Knew"	3:23
11.	"If This Ain't Hell"	4:00
12.	"My Understanding Is Zero"	1:25
13.	"Perpetration"	2:56
14.	"Freak Nasty"	3:19
15.	"Headhunter" (featuring Mastamind)	3:35
16.	"KKKill the Fetus"	4:47
17.	"Don't Blame Me"	3:23
18.	"You Still Hoe'n"	2:39
19.	"Sunshine"	3:33
20.	"My Mind's Blowin' Up!"	3:38
21.	"Get on Down"	3:13
22.	"666"	3:33
23.	"Hellterskkkelter"	3:47
Total length:		73:18
