= I Ain't Cha Homey =

EP by Esham
- Released: July 28, 2009
- Length: 32:46
- Label: RLP/Gothom
- Producer: Esham

Esham chronology
Lamb Chopz (2007)	I Ain't Cha Homey (2009)	Secret Society Circus (2011)

I Ain't Cha Homey is the seventh extended play by Esham A. Smith. Released on July 28, 2009, the album consists entirely of freestyle raps, and marks the return of Smith's "Homey the Clown" persona, which had first appeared on his 1991 EP Homey Don't Play.

== Release ==
A music video for "Happy Happy Joy Joy" was released, in which Smith wore face paint supplied by Insane Clown Posse member Joseph Bruce.

Following the release of the album, rumors surfaced that it was a diss towards Insane Clown Posse. Smith stated that he had recorded the album's tracks in-character and had not intended to disparage anyone. Bruce said that the release of the album strained the relationship between the two, stating "we were hanging out with the guy every day! How can we ever hang out again? I didn't know you felt that way about us. You know, you'd hang out with us during the day then you go home and write that shit? That's insane, you know. So, we're not talking. And I've known him all my life." Esham and Insane Clown Posse however reconciled in 2015, with Esham announced to perform at 2016's Juggalo Day.

== Track listing ==
No.	Title	Performer(s)	Length
1.	"I Ain't Cha Homey"	Esham	2:17
2.	"Juggalotus"	Esham	2:05
3.	"Dr. Kevorkian"	Esham	1:14
4.	"No Rest 4 The Wicket"	Esham	3:46
5.	"Happy Happy Joy Joy"	Esham	3:04
6.	"Dead Clownz"	Esham	1:44
7.	"Painted Up"	Esham / Poe Whosaine	2:37
8.	"Candy Corn"	Esham	1:13
9.	"Odds Against Me"	Esham	2:28
10.	"Oh Face"	Esham	1:52
11.	"Bob Ritchie"	Esham	1:59
12.	"Poker"	Esham / Poe Whosaine	2:00
13.	"Funny MF"	Esham	2:22
14.	"50 Cent"	Esham	1:30
15.	"?????????"	Esham	1:24
16.	"All I Gotta Say"	Esham	1:11
Total length:			32:46
