= Tongues (Esham album) =

Studio album by Esham
- Released: June 19, 2001
- Studio: Overture Recording (Michigan)
- Genre: Hip-hop
- Length: 1:11:59
- Labels: Gothom/Overcore; TVT
- Producer: Esham

Esham chronology
Mail Dominance (1999)	Tongues (2001)	Repentance (2003)

Professional ratings
Review scores
Source	Rating
AllMusic	3/5 stars
Robert Christgau	(neither)

Tongues is the eighth solo studio album by American rapper Esham. It was released on June 19, 2001 through Overcore Records with distribution via TVT Records. Recording sessions took place at Overture Recording in Michigan. Production was handled solely by Esham. It features guest appearances from Brittany Hurd, Kool Keith, Santos, The Dayton Family, Heather Hunter, Jill O'Neil, Mujahid and Violent J, as well as his Natas groupmates Mastamind and TNT. The album peaked at number 195 on the Billboard 200 albums chart in the United States.

== Track listing ==
No.	Title	Writer(s)	Instruments	Length
1.	"Walkin on da Flatline"	Esham A. Smith; Jade Scott Santos	Esham; Santos	2:50
2.	"Slippin out Amerikkka" (featuring Mujahid)	Smith; Mujahid; Santos	Esham; Santos	2:06
3.	"The D."	Smith; Santos	Esham; Santos	1:16
4.	"I'm Dead"	Smith	Esham	2:24
5.	"Panic Attack" (featuring Violent J)	Smith; Joseph Bruce	Esham	2:49
6.	"Chemical Imbalance"	Smith; Santos	Esham; Santos	1:43
7.	"God"	Smith; Santos	Esham; Santos	2:26
8.	"Detroit 101" (featuring Mastamind)	Smith; Gary Reed; Santos	Esham; Santos	2:20
9.	"Poetry"	Smith	Esham	2:55
10.	"Everyone"	Smith; Santos	Esham; Santos	4:13
11.	"Crash & Burn"	Smith; Santos	Esham; Santos	3:16
12.	"Mr. Negativity"	Smith	Esham; Santos	2:43
13.	"Pill Me (Feel My Prescription)" (featuring Jill O'Neil)	Smith; Santos	Santos	3:24
14.	"Brain Surgery" (featuring Mastamind and Shoestring)	Smith; Reed; Raheen Peterson	Esham; Santos	3:00
15.	"Devilshit" (featuring Kool Keith)	Smith; Keith Matthew Thornton	Esham	2:24
16.	"All Night Everyday" (featuring Heather Hunter, Kool Keith and Brittany Hurd)	Smith; Thornton	Esham; Santos	4:55
17.	"I Know" (featuring Brittany Hurd and Santos)	Smith; Santos	Santos	3:33
18.	"So Selfish"	Smith; Santos	Esham; Santos	3:54
19.	"Envy the Sunshine" (featuring Brittany Hurd and Santos)	Smith; Santos	Esham; Santos	4:04
20.	"Love" (featuring T-N-T)	Smith; Terry Jones; Santos	Esham; Santos; Alicia Yang	3:17
21.	"Gloczup"	Smith	Esham	2:45
22.	"Intro (Hallucinagenics)"	Smith	Esham	2:28
23.	"Skydive"	Smith	Esham; Santos	3:15
24.	"Fuck a Lover" (featuring The Dayton Family)	Smith; Ira Dorsey; Erick Dorsey; Peterson	Esham; Santos	3:45
Total length:				1:11:59

== Personnel ==
- Esham "The Unholy" Smith – vocals, producer, recording, mixing, mastering, design, layout
- Mujahid – rap vocals (track 2)
- Joseph "Violent J" Bruce – rap vocals (track 5)
- Gary "Mastamind" Reed – rap vocals (tracks: 8, 14)
- Jill O'Neil – vocals (track 13)
- Raheen "Shoestring" Peterson – rap vocals (tracks: 14, 24)
- "Kool Keith" Matthew Thornton – rap vocals (tracks: 15, 16)
- Heather Hunter – rap vocals (track 16)
- Brittany Hurd – vocals (tracks: 16, 17, 19)
- Jade Scott Santos – vocals (tracks: 17, 19), recording, mixing, mastering, design, layout, photography
- Terry "TNT" Jones – rap vocals (track 20)
- Ira "Bootleg" Dorsey – rap vocals (track 24)
- Erick "Ghetto-E" Dorsey – rap vocals (track 24)

== Charts ==
Chart (2001)	Peak position
US Billboard 200	195
US Top R&B/Hip-Hop Albums (Billboard)	46
US Independent Albums (Billboard)	7
US Heatseekers Albums (Billboard)	14
