= Closed Casket =

Studio album by Esham
- Released: November 22, 1994
- Recorded: 1993–94
- Genre: Horrorcore
- Length: 66:29
- Labels: Reel Life; Warlock
- Producer: Esham

Esham chronology
KKKill the Fetus (1993)	Closed Casket (1994)	Dead Flowerz (1996)

Singles from Closed Casket
- 1. "Stop Diggin' On The D-L" Released: 1994; 2. "Mental Stress" Released: 1994

Professional ratings
Review scores
Source	Rating
Allmusic	2.5/5 stars

Closed Casket is the fourth studio album by Esham, released on November 22, 1994, and distributed by Reel Life Productions and Warlock Records.

== Lyrics and music ==
Because of the Satanic themes of his earlier work, Esham had been accused of Satanism. Feeling that the lyrical content of his albums was being taken too seriously, Esham decided that after producing one final album with such material, he would no longer rap about the Devil.

Jason Birchmeier noted that "the production improves upon past albums, not as reliant on samples and obviously more crafted".

== Reception ==
Allmusic wrote "most fans taking a chronological approach to his catalog should be fairly numb to Esham's exploitative shock attempts. Yet if this is one of your first experiences with Esham the Unholy, this album should pack a punch with its dark nature."

== Track listing ==
No.	Title	Length
1.	"The Eulogy"	1:11
2.	"The Wicketshit Will Never Die"	3:29
3.	"My Homie Got Shot"	2:04
4.	"Mental Stress"	4:31
5.	"Can't Take It Wit Cha"	3:58
6.	"Brainwashed"	2:46
7.	"Drive U2 Suicide"	2:15
8.	"Chatty Ass Nigga" (performed by Natas)	2:49
9.	"Slug Froma 45"	2:48
10.	"Was It Sum'n I Said"	0:49
11.	"Flatline"	3:03
12.	"I Don't Owe U Shit"	3:45
13.	"Therapy"	3:28
14.	"Make Me Wanna Holla"	5:10
15.	"Would You Die 4 Me"	3:01
16.	"2 Dollahoe"	1:53
17.	"24/7"	4:46
18.	"Diggin on da D-L"	3:29
19.	"Premature Ejaculation"	4:42
20.	"I'll Be Glad When You Dead"	2:59
21.	"Closed Casket"	3:41

== Personnel ==
- Esham - Performer
- TNT - Guest Performer
- Mastamind - Guest Performer
- Producer: Esham
- Executive Producer: James H. Smith
- Engineer: Esham
- Mastering: Esham
- Programming: Esham
