= Blaz4me =

Studio album by Natas
- Released: January 8, 1994
- Recorded: 1993
- Genre: Hip-hop
- Length: 57:52
- Label: Reel Life Productions
- Producer: Esham

Natas chronology
Life After Death (1992)	Blaz4me (1994)	Doubelievengod (1995)

Professional ratings
Review scores
Source	Rating
Allrovi	2/5 stars

Blaz4me is the second album by Natas, released on January 8, 1994. Allrovi reviewer Jason Birchmeier wrote "like the Bomb Squad's collage-like approach on It Takes a Nation to Hold Us Back and Dr. Dre's neo-P-Funk sound on The Chronic, Esham crafts a particular aesthetic by endlessly raiding his record collection in classic postmodern fashion. Still, even if he unethically creates an innovative-for-its-time sound that merges Funkadelic guitar distortion with hard mid-'80s Def Jam-like beats, the often ridiculous lyrics ruin whatever validity the music may have."

== Track listing ==
#	Title	Time	Producer(s)	Performer(s)	Samples
1	"Bacindatassforanuthafuc"	1:49	Esham	Mastamind, TNT, Esham	
2	"I'm Bout 2 Do Some Dirt"	3:32	Esham	Mastamind	"It's Funky Enough" by The D.O.C.; "Nobody Move, Nobody Get Hurt" by Yellowman
3	"Hands On My Nutsac"	2:38	Esham	TNT	
4	"Wet Pussy On Saturday Night"	4:02	Esham	Mastamind, TNT, Esham	
5	"He Raped Me"	3:08	Esham	Esham	
6	"All In Yo Head"	3:27	Esham	Mastamind	
7	"I Ain't Giving Up No Love"	2:29	Esham	TNT Esham(Hook verse)	
8	"Get My Dick Out Yo Mouth"	1:24	Esham	TNT(Opening Verse) Mastamind	
9	"Stay True To Your City"	4:36	Esham	Esham, Mastamind, TNT	"(Not Just) Knee Deep" by Funkadelic; "One Nation Under a Groove" by Funkadelic
10	"A Friendly Word 2u Suckas"	4:03	Esham	Esham	
11	"Fucking Up the Program"	2:43	Esham	Mastamind, TNT, Esham	
12	"A View 2 a Kill"	3:41	Esham	Mastamind	
13	"Killas Don't Talk"	2:27	Esham	TNT	
14	"U Can't Fuck Wit Mastamind"	3:37	Esham	Mastamind	
15	"Anutha Day Anutha Hit"	3:06	Esham	Mastamind	
16	"Down Since Day One/Pain"	5:00	Esham	Esham	
17	"Blaz4me"	2:59	Esham	Esham, Mastamind, TNT	
18	"Booyaa"	3:11	Esham	Mastamind, TNT, Esham	
