= Bruce Wayne: Gothom City 1987 =

Studio album by Esham
- Released: June 1997
- Genre: Alternative hip-hop
- Length: 70:36
- Label: Gothom
- Producer: Esham

Esham chronology
Dead Flowerz (1996)	Bruce Wayne: Gothom City 1987 (1997)	Mail Dominance (1999)

Professional ratings
Review scores
Source	Rating
Allrovi	2.5/5 stars

Bruce Wayne: Gothom City 1987 is the sixth album by Esham, released in 1997. A concept album, Esham takes on the fictional character of Batman's public persona, the wealthy and reclusive Bruce Wayne. Esham's native Detroit becomes "Gothom" or Gotham City. Esham shifts away from horrorcore in this album, presenting an alternative style. AllMusic wrote that the album is one of Esham's best, even though it could have been better.

== Track listing ==
No.	Title	Length
1.	"Comerica"	2:44
2.	"You Still Ain't Shit To Me"	2:17
3.	"7 Mile Rd."	2:41
4.	"Lowlafalana"	3:54
5.	"Change Ya Mind"	4:00
6.	"You and Me"	4:58
7.	"Gimme Ya Love"	4:10
8.	"Who Is Bruce Wayne"	3:37
9.	"1987"	3:21
10.	"You Betta Ask Somebody"	4:53
11.	"Where My B At"	3:04
12.	"Fuck Da Fame"	3:38
13.	"Seems Like Yesterday"	5:38
14.	"[untitled]"	4:04
15.	"[untitled]"	1:54
16.	"Detective"	2:51
17.	"Nervous"	2:08
18.	"[untitled]"	2:45
19.	"[untitled]"	3:51
20.	"Gothom City"	4:08

== Personnel ==
- Esham (as Bruce Wayne) - rapping, programming, composing, producing
- Zelah Williams - backing vocals
- Mastamind - guest performer
- TNT - guest performer
- Moebadis - guest performer
- Drunken Master - guest performer

== Charts ==
Album - Billboard (North America)

Year	Chart	Position
1997	Top R&B/Hip-Hop Albums	57
