= Sacrificial Lambz =

Studio album by Esham
- Released: August 26, 2008
- Recorded: 2008
- Studio: Heavens Gates Studios (Detroit, MI)
- Genre: Hip-hop
- Length: 1:15:41
- Label: Reel Life; Aknu Media
- Producer: Esham

Esham chronology
A-1 Yola (2005)	Sacrificial Lambz (2008)	Suspended Animation (2010)

Singles from Sacrificial Lambz
- 1. "World Hustle" Released: 2008

Professional ratings
Review scores
Source	Rating
Alternative Press	3/5
PopMatters	7/10

Sacrificial Lambz is the eleventh solo studio album by American rapper and record producer Esham. It was released on August 26, 2008 through Reel Life Productions and Aknu Media.

Preceded by a lone single "World Hustle", the album marks the rapper's departure from Psychopathic Records and the first studio album since reviving Reel Life Productions. In the United States, the album debuted at number 42 on the Top R&B/Hip-Hop Albums, number 21 on the Top Rap Albums and number 50 on the Heatseekers Albums charts.

Before the album's release, Esham launched his month-long Sacrificial Lambs 2008 Tour, in conjunction with Aknu Media and Cocaine Energy Drink, which would include fellow Detroit rapper Royce da 5'9". But due to his working schedules on his own Bar Exam 2 and Street Hop projects, Royce cancels his participation on the tour.

== Reception ==
In an interview with Sixshot.com, Esham spoke about the album: "Sacrificial Lambz and my whole style and just the way that I rap has been a sacrifice to the industry. I feel like Sacrificial Lambz is like a gift to the industry and a gift to the consumer, whoever buys it. It's actually a gift".

Matt Conley of New Bedford Standard-Times found Esham's style on the album as "rough and rugged, mixing straight up hip-hop flows with disturbing ballads that often come through the airwaves like lyrical nightmares".

In his review for Exclaim!, Thomas Quinlan saw the album "tends instead towards socio-political and religious commentary, as well as gangsta rap, rather than the style he has labelled as 'acid rap' and 'wicked shit'". He continued, "it's a noble endeavour but at 27 tracks in length and with absolutely no guests, the album becomes a little overbearing and boring long before the final song ends... His flow doesn't always suit the beats either... Lose some of that dead weight and Sacrificial Lambz would be a much better record".

== Track listing ==
No.	Title	Length
1.	"Zeitgeist"	3:33
2.	"Garbitch"	1:51
3.	"6 Million"	1:50
4.	"DSL"	1:12
5.	"Unholy Knights"	3:34
6.	"Ukillme"	3:38
7.	"Sacrificial Lambz"	4:05
8.	"No Place on Earth"	2:15
9.	"All Pro"	1:10
10.	"Waterhose"	2:42
11.	"Livin Legend"	2:35
12.	"Cant Let Go"	3:41
13.	"Stay on Yo Toes"	2:16
14.	"Nowimtalkinbout"	3:29
15.	"Get Me Down"	1:51
16.	"Fuck U"	2:09
17.	"Dead Rappers"	3:33
18.	"Levies Broke"	2:38
19.	"Root of Evil"	4:41
20.	"Ant No Telling"	1:53
21.	"Dont Give Up"	2:45
22.	"Ringtone"	3:39
23.	"Fallen Down"	3:09
24.	"Mirror Mirror"	2:04
25.	"Better Than the Rest"	2:41
26.	"Angels and Demons"	2:59
27.	"Substance Abuse"	3:47
Total length:		1:15:41

== Charts ==
Chart (2008)	Peak position
US Top R&B/Hip-Hop Albums (Billboard)	42
US Top Rap Albums (Billboard)	21
US Heatseekers Albums (Billboard)	50
