= Life After Death (Natas album) =

Studio album by Natas
- Released: February 16, 1992
- Genre: Hip hop • Horrorcore
- Length: 75:41
- Label: Reel Life Productions
- Producer: Esham

Natas chronology
Life After Death (1992)	Blaz4me (1994)

Professional ratings
Review scores
Source	Rating
Allmusic	1.5/5 stars

Life After Death is the debut studio album of Natas, released in 1992.

== Controversy ==
Following the release of this album, Esham, Natas and Reel Life Productions were the subject of much controversy when a 17-year-old fan killed himself while smoking cannabis and playing Russian roulette while listening to Life After Death.

== Reception ==
Allrovi reviewer Jason Birchmeier wrote that "The trio's attempt to be as hardcore as possible pushes their efforts from shocking to clichéd satire. Furthermore, in addition to the clichéd subject matter, the accompanying music isn't nearly as evocative as that found on Esham's solo albums. The group's later albums would eventually integrate a further sense of sincerity and less theatrics as well as a stronger musical soundtrack; this debut finds them simply trying to make a splash by being as insane as possible."

== Track listing ==
#	Title	Time	Producer(s)	Performer(s)	Samples
1	"Life After Death"	4:14	Esham	Esham, Mastamind, TNT	"Let's Go Crazy" by Prince and The Revolution; "Die Nigga!!!" by The Last Poets; "Paul Revere" by Beastie Boys
2	"Did It Like That"	4:48	Esham	TNT	
3	"Dance"	3:05	Esham	Esham	"I Can Make You Dance" by Zapp; "Ziplock" by Ice-T; "Shake It (Do The 61st)" by Anquette "BatDance" by Prince
4	"Toss Up"	4:01	Esham	Mastamind, TNT, Esham	
5	"Bitch Stop Lyin'"	3:15	Esham	TNT	"La Di Da Di" by Doug E. Fresh; "A Bitch Iz A Bitch" by N.W.A; "Gangsta Gangsta" by N.W.A
6	"Bad Guys Never Lose"	3:51	Esham	Mastamind	"Eazy-Duz-It" by Eazy-E
7	"1 Time 4 Yo Mind"	3:43	Esham	Mastamind	
8	"Get My Head Together"	4:17	Esham	Esham	"Big Sur Suite" by Johnny Hammond; "The Big Beat" by Billy Squier; "Pumpin' It Up (Special Club Mix)" by P-Funk All Stars
9	"Hellraiser"	3:25	Esham	Mastamind	
10	"Bitches on My Mind"	3:14	Esham	Mastamind	"Atomic Dog" by George Clinton; "A Bitch Iz a Bitch" by N.W.A
11	"Mysterious Ways"	4:07	Esham	Mastamind, Esham	"Shake Your Rump " by Beastie Boys
12	"Rock It Deadly"	3:01	Esham	Mastamind	"Terminator X Speaks With His Hands" by Public Enemy
13	"Who Am I"	3:33	Esham	TNT	
14	"Spent My Last on a Hoe"	4:45	Esham	Esham, TNT, Mastamind	
15	"Bitch You Can't Have Me"	2:40	Esham	Esham, TNT	
16	"Home of the Brave"	2:39	Esham	Mastamind	
17	"Dirty Mind"	3:02	Esham	Mastamind	"Do Me, Baby" by Prince
18	"I Ain't Got Shit 2 Lose"	4:31	Esham	TNT	"The Message" by Grandmaster Flash
19	"In the Name of RLP"	4:13	Esham	Mastamind	"Right Place, Wrong Time" by Dr. John
20	"Dancin' On Ya Grave"	4:14	Esham	Mastamind, Esham	"Friends" by Whodini
