= Dead Flowerz =

Studio album by Esham
- Released: May 7, 1996
- Genre: Hip-hop
- Length: 64:25
- Label: Reel Life Productions
- Producer: Esham

Esham chronology
| Closed Casket (1994) | Dead Flowerz (1996) | Bruce Wayne: Gothom City 1987 (1997) |

Singles from Dead Flowerz
- 1. "You Better Ask Somebody" Released: 1996

Professional ratings
Review scores
| Source | Rating |
|---|---|
| Allrovi | 3/5 stars |

Dead Flowerz is the fifth studio album by Esham. Released in 1996, it peaked at #38 on the Billboard Top R&B/Hip-Hop Albums chart.

== Track listing ==
All tracks by Esham

1. "What" – 2:34
2. "You Betta Ask Somebody" – 3:22
3. "Tony Montana" – 1:48
4. "Kill or Be Killed" – 3:46
5. "What Did I Do Wrong" – 3:35
6. "Foodstamp" – 3:15
7. "Any Style You Want" – 3:48
8. "Killagram" – 3:18
9. "One Day" – 4:28
10. "Fried Chicken" – 2:31
11. "Because" – 3:54
12. "Black Orchid" – 4:38
13. "Trick Wit Me" – 3:43
14. "If I Can't Have U" – 2:30
15. "Hold U Up" – 3:01
16. "U Ain't Fresh" – 2:21
17. "Charlie Manson" – 2:40
18. "Silicone" – 3:56
19. "Wit Yo Punk Azz" (featuring Dice, Bugz, and Drunken Master) – 2:04
20. "Where All My Nigz At" (featuring Dice and Razzaq) – 2:50

== Personnel ==
- Esham - performer
- Zelah Williams - background vocals
- Dice - guest performer
- Bugz - guest performer
- Drunken Master - guest performer

== Production ==
- Producer: Esham
- Producer: Lord Maji
- Programming: Esham
- Programming: Lord Maji
- Arranger: Esham
- Liner notes: Esham
