= Boomin' Words from Hell =

Studio album by Esham
- Released: 1989; 1990 (reissue); 2015 (remastered reissue)
- Genre: Horrorcore
- Length: 52:50
- Label: Reel Life
- Producer: Esham

Esham chronology
Boomin' Words from Hell (1989)	Judgement Day (1992)

Boomin' Words from Hell is the debut studio album by the American musician Esham. It was released in 1989, and reissued the following year.

== Production ==
Boomin' Words from Hell was recorded in one day.

== Lyrical themes ==
The lyrics of Boomin' Words from Hell developed from the turmoil of Detroit at the time, including the era's rise in crack use. According to Esham, "It was all an expression about ['70s-'80s drug cartel] Young Boys Incorporated, Mayor Coleman Young, the city we lived in and just the turmoil that our city was going through at the time. We referred to the streets of Detroit as 'Hell' on that record. So that's where my ideas came from."

According to Esham, the album's lyrical content was so dark that it was the subject of many rumors:

"People got the first album, and they would just make up stories. They'd get into an accident and be like, 'I got into an accident because I was playing that tape.' It wasn't like we helped ourselves when we described what was in people's heads. It wasn't to shock people, though, but to get people involved in what we were doing. We had to get peoples' attention. [...] We said a lot of things that people wanted to say but didn't say. We talked about a lot of political and social [issues] that people didn't want to talk about."

== Release ==
Boomin' Words from Hell was first issued in 1989. It was promoted via word of mouth. Following the album's initial release, the album was reissued with an alternate track listing and artwork in 1990. Word After Word was also censored in the second half of the line, "I'm not an atheist / But what has god done for me?". A 25th anniversary reissue of the album, containing songs from the original release as well as the 1990 version, was released on February 13, 2015.

== Reception ==
Professional ratings
Review scores
Source	Rating
AllMusic	2/5 stars
RapReviews	7.5/10

Esham found it difficult to develop a fanbase, because many wrote off the dark content of his lyrics and imagery as shock value, while hip hop fans did not connect to the album because of Smith's heavy metal influences. In All Music Guide to Hip-Hop Jason Birchmeier writes that "Many of the songs here are fairly mediocre relative to Esham's later work, but there are a few gems here that foreshadow his subsequent work." Rap Reviews reviewer John-Michael Bond wrote that "the fully realized darkness that surrounds both soundtrack and verses on Boomin Words... stands as a stark reminder that just because someone's a kid doesn't mean he can't have anything to say."

== Track listing ==
1989 version
No.	Title	Length
1.	"Esham's Boomin"	4:11
2.	"Word After Word"	3:47
3.	"Dream Girl"	2:08
4.	"Some Old Wicket Shit!!!"	3:00
5.	"Kissing Bandit"	3:33
6.	"Devil's Groove"	3:08
7.	"Telling It How It Is"	2:28
8.	"Amen Another Sin"	1:49
9.	"My 9 Rhymes"	1:39
10.	"Pussy Ain't Got No Face"	3:35
11.	"Don't Trip"	3:18
12.	"Watch 'Cha Back"	2:30

1990 version
No.	Title	Length
1.	"Esham's Boomin"	4:11
2.	"My 9 Rhymes"	1:39
3.	"4 All the Suicidalist"	4:03
4.	"Dream Girl"	2:08
5.	"Devil's Groove"	3:08
6.	"True"	4:09
7.	"Knockin Em Dead"	2:58
8.	"Red Rum"	4:08
9.	"Kissing Bandit"	3:33
10.	"Some Old Wicket Shit!!!"	3:00
11.	"Cross My Heart"	3:15
12.	"Amen Another Sin"	1:49
13.	"Pussy Ain't Got No Face"	3:35
14.	"Word After Word"	3:47
15.	"Wish U Was Down"	3:03
16.	"Devils in the Soup"	4:36
Total length:		53:05

2015 version
No.	Title	Length
1.	"Esham's Boomin"	4:11
2.	"My 9 Rhymes"	1:39
3.	"4 All the Suicidalist"	4:03
4.	"Dream Girl"	2:08
5.	"Devil's Groove"	3:08
6.	"True"	4:09
7.	"Knockin Em Dead"	2:58
8.	"Red Rum"	4:08
9.	"Kissing Bandit"	3:33
10.	"Some Old Wicket Shit!!!"	3:00
11.	"Cross My Heart"	3:15
12.	"Amen Another Sin"	1:49
13.	"Pussy Ain't Got No Face"	3:35
14.	"Word After Word"	3:47
15.	"Wish U Was Down"	3:03
16.	"Devils in the Soup"	4:36
17.	"Telling It How It Is"	2:28
18.	"Don't Trip"	3:18
19.	"Watch 'Cha Back"	2:30
Total length:		61:29

== Personnel ==
- Esham – programming, production, engineering, mastering
- Mike E. Clark – engineering, keyboards
- Reginal Nelton – executive producer
- Greg Reilly – mastering
- James H. Smith – executive producer
