= Natas (group) =

American hip hop group

- Origin: Detroit, Michigan, United States
- Genres: Horrorcore
- Years active: 1992–2002, 2005–2010, 2013–present
- Labels: Reel Life Productions
- Members: Esham; Mastamind
- Past members: T-N-T (deceased)
- Website: AcidRap.com

Natas (Nation Ahead of Time And Space, originally Niggas Ahead of Time And Space, also Satan backwards) is an American hip hop group from Detroit, Michigan best known as representatives of horrorcore featuring the members Mastamind, T-N-T, and Esham. The group effectively disbanded after the death of T-N-T in 2014. However, Esham and Mastamind have since periodically continued to tour together under the Natas name.

== History ==
Esham met Mastamind as a student at Osborne High School, who gave him a three-song demo tape of his music, leading the two to form the group with Esham's longtime friend, T-N-T, deciding on the name Natas, an acronym for "Nation Ahead of Time and Space", and because it was "Satan" spelled backwards. In 1992, Natas released its first album, Life After Death on Esham's Reel Life Productions. Following the release of this album, Esham, Natas and Reel Life Productions were the subject of much controversy when a 17-year-old fan killed himself while smoking cannabis and playing Russian roulette while listening to Life After Death.

In 2002, Natas released its only charting album to date, Godlike, which peaked at #35 on the Billboard Top Independent Albums chart, #45 on the Heatseekers chart and #56 on the Top R&B/Hip-Hop Albums chart. This was the last album of new material recorded by the group, until FUQERRBDY. Previously recorded material was released in 2006 and 2009 on N of tha World and The Vatican. In 2013 it was announced on Mastamind's official Facebook account that a new Natas album has been planned and after the release of his next album "The Ultimate Price" they will begin recording the album with an expected 2014 release date. This was later confirmed by Esham and then later by Mastamind's label Lyrikal Snuff Productionz. On December 8, 2013 once again via his official Facebook account, Mastamind announced that recording of the new Natas album was completed and was in the mixing stages. Esham, Mastamind, and the official Natas Facebook confirmed that FUQERRBDY was to be released on July 15, 2014.

On December 20, 2014, Natas member T-N-T was killed in a car accident. Esham has said in his interview with Faygoluvers, for his 16th album Scribble, "There won't be another Natas album".

Mastamind & Esham performed as Natas at the 2023 Gathering of the Juggalos.

== Style and influence ==
Natas refers to its performance style as "acid rap", comparing the lyrics to hallucinations induced by LSD. Acid rap has been described as a fusion of hip hop beats and death metal lyrics. Esham defined the genre as analogous to "modern day blues [or] heavy metal". AllMusic writer Jason Birchmeier said that Mastamind's rapping "owes little to any conventional style".

Natas is known for using live instrumentation, as well as for highly sample-based instrumentation, which AllMusic compared to that of the Bomb Squad and Dr. Dre. Natas' lyrics focus on topics ranging from women and violence to spirituality, expressing self-reliance.

== Discography ==
Studio albums

- Life After Death (1992)
- Blaz4me (1994)
- Doubelievengod (1995)
- Multikillionaire: The Devil's Contract (1997)
- WicketWorldWide.COM (1999)
- Godlike (2002)
- N of tha World (2006)
- FUQERRBDY (2014)

Mixtapes

- The Vatican (2009)
