= Mastamind =

American rapper

- Born: Gary Reed; December 28, 1972 (age 53); Detroit, Michigan, U.S.
- Genres: Hip hop; horrorcore
- Occupation: Rapper
- Years active: 1991–present
- Labels: Toxsic; Reel Life; Krazi House Records; LSP
- Member of: Natas

Gary Reed (born December 28, 1972), also known as Mastamind, is an American rapper from Detroit best known as a representative of the hip hop subgenre horrorcore. A founding member of Natas, he was formerly signed with Reel Life Productions before forming his own label, Toxsic Records.

== Biography ==
While attending Osborn High School, Mastamind passed a three-song demo to fellow student, Esham, who had released the album Boomin' Words from Hell and multiple EPs on his Reel Life Productions label. Esham liked the demo, and decided to form a group with Mastamind and a friend, T-N-T. The trio named the group Natas, an acronym for "Nation Ahead of Time And Space".

In 1995, Mastamind released his debut solo EP, Lickkuidrano, which featured guest appearances by Esham and Dice. Allmusic reviewer Jason Birchmeier wrote, "[Bitcheshate] is obviously the EP's centerpiece, as the other five tracks are all rather brief -- still, they're impressive tracks even if they are short." In 2000, Mastamind released his debut album, Themindzi, which received critical acclaim in the underground music scene; Murder Dog magazine named Mastamind as 2000's "most slept on" rapper. Allmusic reviewer Jason Birchmeier wrote "Just being able to sit back and listen to Mastamind craft his own unique style with confidence is engaging enough to make this a worthwhile album." The album's release was followed by Mastamind's first national tour. In 2010 and 2011, Mastamind performed at the 11th and 12th annual Gathering of the Juggalos. Mastamind is planning to release a new album in 2012 called Mastapeice through Toxsic Records and distributed by Lyrikal Snuff Productions. In 2013 Mastamind is to re-release his EP Lickkuidrano in an LP form. The re release will include 6 remixes from the hell razor, and 6 new tracks. Also Mastamind is to re release his first greatest hits called the Collection Plate. In 2014, he wrote a verse alongside Detroit artists Bizarre and Jeremiah Ferguson for their song "Whats Right"

== Style and influences ==
AllMusic writer Jason Birchmeier said that Mastamind's rapping "owes little to any conventional style".

== Discography ==
=== Studio albums ===
- Themindzi (2000)
- Street Valu (2003)
- Hellrazer (2006)
- Toxsic Avenger (2009)
- Ntoxsication (2011)
- The Mastapiece (2012)
- Lickkuiddrano (Re-Issue) (2013)
- The Ultimate Price (2015)
- Uranium (2016)
- House of Frankenstein Teddy Bass (2017)
- The Ultimate Warrior (Double LP) (2021)

=== Extended plays ===
- Lickkuiddrano (1995)
- The Orthus with Skitzo of Merk (2011)
- The Ultimate Price (2013)
- House of Frankenstein - Black Sunrise with Teddy Bass (2018)
- Sleep Tight Sweet Dreamz (2019)

=== Mixtapes ===
- Khemicalspill (2010)
- Last+emptationOfChris+ (2010)
- Mastercard (2010)
- Doublehead Everythang (2012)
- The Orthus Reloaded with Skitzo of Merk (2012)
- Devil Eyed Dog with Skitzo of Merk (2014)
