= Esham =

American rapper

- Born: Esham Attica Smith; September 20, 1973 (age 53); Long Island, New York, U.S.
- Origin: Detroit, Michigan, U.S.
- Genres: Midwestern hip-hop; horrorcore; hardcore hip-hop
- Occupations: Rapper; record producer
- Years active: 1988–present
- Labels: Reel Life; Psychopathic
- Member of: Natas
- Website: acidrap.com

Esham Attica Smith (born September 20, 1973), known mononymously as Esham, is an American rapper from Detroit, Michigan. Emerging as one of the first ever hip hop artists from Detroit, Esham released his debut studio album, Boomin' Words from Hell, in 1989 at the age of 16. Since then, he has gone on to release 21 full-length studio albums in total and is best known as a representative of the hip hop subgenre horrorcore. In 1992, he co-founded the horrorcore group Natas. He and his brother James Smith founded and ran the Detroit hip hop label Reel Life Productions.

As one of the first rappers to receive attention in the city, Esham was often cited as a major influence on another Detroit horrorcore act, Insane Clown Posse. Esham is known for incorporating elements of rock music in his beats, and his lyrics cover a number of subjects, including death, drug use, evil, paranoia and sex. Esham refers to his style of music as "acid rap".

== Biography ==
=== Early career ===
Born Esham Attica Smith on September 20, 1973, in Long Island, New York, Esham primarily grew up in the Seven Mile neighborhood on the East side of Detroit, Michigan, where he lived with his mother. He attended Osborn High School, and lived with his grandmother in New York during summers. He studied piano, guitar, and trombone in high school, and listened to artists such as The Sugarhill Gang, Run-DMC, Ozzy Osbourne and Kiss. Esham began to write original lyrics, and was encouraged by his older brother, James H. Smith, to seriously pursue a career in hip hop. According to Esham, "He felt like I had a dope flow, and he thought I could bring something new to the game, just coming from the city of Detroit. Back then, it wasn't really a [rap] music scene in Detroit. Everybody was just imitating what everybody else was doing." In the second grade, Esham met Champtown, who was also an aspiring rapper. The two performed together at open mic events Seafood Bay. In one occurrence, Champtown and Esham were forced to rap for a drug dealer at gunpoint.

At the age of 16, Smith released his debut album, Boomin' Words from Hell, in 1989. Of the album, Smith stated, "It was the crack era, [...] and that's where all that really came from. It was all an expression about ['70s-'80s drug cartel] Young Boys Incorporated, Mayor Coleman Young, the city we lived in and just the turmoil that our city was going through at the time. We referred to the streets of Detroit as 'Hell' on that record. So that's where my ideas came from." In 1990, Esham and James H. Smith founded the independent record label Reel Life Productions, which reissued his debut album with an alternate track listing and artwork. Esham found it difficult to develop a fanbase, because many wrote off the dark content of his lyrics and imagery as shock value, while hip hop fans did not connect to Esham's albums because of his heavy metal influences.

In 1991, Esham met Joseph Bruce, a member of the group Inner City Posse, who praised Esham and Reel Life Productions, and gave Esham a copy of the group's EP Dog Beats, beginning the two rappers' friendship and professional relationship.

After releasing two EPs, Erotic Poetry and Homey Don't Play, Esham completed the double album Judgement Day, and its two volumes, Day and Night were released separately on April 9, 1992. In All Music Guide to Hip-Hop, Jason Birchmeier wrote that Judgement Day, Vol. 1 "may not be his most well-crafted work, but it certainly stands as his most inspired work of the '90s", while Vol. 2 "isn't quite as strong as the first volume, suffering mostly from a number of weak tracks [...] the first volume doesn't rely quite so much on cheap shock, instead focusing on evocative horror motifs, making Judgement Day, Vol. 2 the less important of the two."

=== KKKill the Fetus, Closed Casket and Dead Flowerz ===
As a student at Osborn High School, Esham met Mastamind, who gave him a three-song demo tape of his music, leading the two to form the group Natas with Esham's longtime friend, TNT. In 1992, Esham appeared on Carnival of Carnage, the debut album of Insane Clown Posse, released on October 18. He produced three tracks and rapped on the album's final track. In November, Natas released their debut album, Life After Death. Following the release of this album, Esham, Natas and Reel Life Productions were the subject of much controversy when a 17-year-old fan killed himself while smoking cannabis and playing Russian roulette while listening to Life After Death. In 1993, Esham released his third solo album, KKKill the Fetus. Jason Birchmeier wrote that "At this point in his career, his rapping has already reached near-peak levels, and his production shows a continued path towards an inventiveness. [...] Never again would Esham be so gritty."

On November 22, 1994, Esham released his fourth studio album, Closed Casket. Jason Birchmeier wrote that "most fans taking a chronological approach to his catalog should be fairly numb to Esham's exploitative shock attempts. Yet if this is one of your first experiences with Esham the Unholy, this album should pack a punch with its dark nature." In May 1996, Esham released his fifth studio album, Dead Flowerz. It peaked at number 38 on the Billboard Top R&B/Hip-Hop Albums chart.

=== Gothom Records (1997–2001) ===
In June 1997, Esham rebranded Reel Life Productions as Gothom Records, and released the album Bruce Wayne: Gothom City 1987, which charted at number 57 on Top R&B/Hip-Hop Albums. Esham later signed a distribution deal with Overcore, a subsidiary of Overture Music, which later became distributed by TVT Records. In June 2001, Gothom released Kool Keith's Spankmaster album, which featured several contributions by Esham, as well as Smith's eighth album, Tongues, which peaked at number seven on the Top Independent Albums chart, number 46 on the Top R&B/Hip-Hop Albums chart and number 195 on the Billboard 200. In August 2001, Esham and D12 were kicked off the Warped Tour after members of the group allegedly physically attacked Smith over the lyrics of his song "Chemical Imbalance", which contained a reference to the daughter of D12 member Eminem, who was not present during the tour.

=== Psychopathic Records (2002–2005) ===
In 2002, Esham signed with Psychopathic Records, releasing the compilation Acid Rain. It was announced that Esham would be moving away from the horror themes of his previous efforts. On November 18, 2003, Esham released his ninth studio album, Repentance. It peaked at No. 9 on the Top Heatseekers chart, No. 10 on the Top Independent Albums chart, and No. 71 on the Top R&B/Hip-Hop Albums chart. Jason Birchmeier wrote that "Repentance is a small step forward for Esham. He seems very confident here, comfortable with himself as an artist [...] when he pulls everything together [...] he makes some of the best music of his long, fruitful, yet largely unacknowledged career."

In 2005 Esham joined forces with Insane Clown Posse and Lavel to release the Soopa Villainz album Furious.

His follow-up album on Psychopathic A-1 Yola, saw Esham achieving his highest consecutive level of charting success, as it peaked at 176 on the Billboard 200, his highest-selling album on that chart to date, as well as peaking at No. 6 on Top Heatseekers, No. 12 on the Independent Albums chart, No. 23 on the Top Rap Albums chart, and No. 48 on the Top R&B chart. Allrovi wrote, "During the course of A-1 YOLA, Esham takes the form of street hustler, kingpin, vampire, and all sorts of underworld characters, injecting his undiluted personality into each three-to-four-minute sketch. His sonic backdrop remains raw but fresh, drawing an impressive amount of energy out of sparse beats."

Following this release, Esham left Psychopathic in 2005 to relaunch Reel Life/Gothom.

=== Post-Psychopathic ===
Smith released his twelfth studio album, Suspended Animation on August 3, 2010, followed by the album DMT Sessions, and a documentary directed by Smith, Death of an Indie Label in 2011, which was originally announced as a bonus feature on a deluxe edition of DMT Sessions, but was instead uploaded onto Gothom Inc.'s YouTube channel. The Documentary was released with a soundtrack entitled the same, the LP would feature Seven the General as well as Poe Whosaine. Smith was interviewed for the documentary The Untold Story of Detroit Hip-Hop, which is being produced by Detroit rapper Champtown. He also attempted a run for mayor of Detroit.

In 2012, MTV published a story detailing Esham's feud with Eminem and Insane Clown Posse. In 2015 Esham and Insane Clown Posse reconciled their differences and Esham performed at the 2016 Juggalo Day "Ringmaster" Show.

== Style ==
Esham's lyrical style, which author Sara Cohen says "utilize[s] shocking (and blatantly over the top) narratives to give an over-exaggerated, almost cartoon-like version of urban deprivation in Detroit", was derived from the style of the Geto Boys. Smith's lyrics have focused on themes such as death, drug use, evil, paranoia and sex, and have included references to Satan. Smith refers to his performance style as "acid rap", comparing the lyrics to hallucinations induced by LSD. Esham's style has also been described as horrorcore hip hop.

People were literally scared of my records. There have been so many rumors about me and my records. People got the first album, and they would just make up stories. They'd get into an accident and be like, 'I got into an accident because I was playing that tape.' It wasn't like we helped ourselves when we described what was in people's heads. It wasn't to shock people, though, but to get people involved in what we were doing. We had to get peoples' attention. [...] We said a lot of things that people wanted to say but didn't say. We talked about a lot of political and social [issues] that people didn't want to talk about.

Following accusations of Satanism, Smith decided that Closed Casket would be the last album to feature such themes, and that he would no longer rap about the Devil. According to Smith, "I've been able to entertain people for 20 years. I just try to uplift people now. The latest things I do, I'm trying to get a message out to people, while I'm entertaining them at the same time."

Esham's music style has been described as a fusion of hip hop beats and death metal lyrics. Esham defined his style as analogous to "modern-day blues [or] heavy metal". Insane Clown Posse has frequently cited Esham as an influence on their music.

== Discography ==
Studio albums

- Boomin' Words from Hell (1989)
- Judgement Day (1992)
- KKKill the Fetus (1993)
- Closed Casket (1994)
- Dead Flowerz (1996)
- Bruce Wayne: Gothom City 1987 (1997)
- Mail Dominance (1999)
- Tongues (2001)
- Repentance (2003)
- A-1 Yola (2005)
- Sacrificial Lambz (2008)
- Suspended Animation (2010)
- DMT Sessions (2011)
- Venus Flytrap (2012)
- Dichotomy (2015)
- Scribble (2017)
- Dead of Winter (2018)
- She Loves Me (2020)
- She Loves Me Not (2020)
- Psyops (2021)
- Purgatory (2023)
- The Golden Age (2025)
