= Reel Life Productions =

American independent record label

- Parent company: Aknu Media
- Founded: 1989
- Founder: James H. Smith; Esham
- Distributors: Overture Records (1998–2001); Overcore Records (1998–2001); Pollution Distribution (1998–2001); TVT Records (1998–2001); Aknu Media (2007–present); Select-O-Hits (2007–present)
- Genre: Horrorcore
- Country of origin: US
- Location: Detroit, Michigan
- Official website: www.AcidRap.com

Reel Life Productions, also known as Gothom Records, is an independent record label based in Detroit, Michigan most associated with the hip hop subgenre horrorcore. The label was founded in 1989 by James H. Smith and his younger brother, rapper Esham. Since its formation, RLP had released much of Esham's discography, and had been home to a number of other artists, including Natas, Dice, Mastamind, T-N-T and The Dayton Family.

While the label was once cited as a vibrant example of independent success in Detroit hip hop, Reel Life Productions' peak in success occurred under distribution through TVT Records and an association with Overcore Records.

== History ==
=== Establishment (1989–1997) ===
James H. Smith founded the label in 1989 with his younger brother, Esham, a rapper. According to Esham, by the time he had started to rap, Detroit did not have a prominent hip hop scene. Smith states that "Everybody was just imitating what everybody else was doing". His older brother, James, encouraged him to seriously pursue a career as a rapper because of the city's limited hip hop scene. In 1989, Esham released his debut album, Boomin' Words from Hell. In 1990, Reel Life Productions reissued his debut album with an alternate track listing and artwork. Esham found it difficult to develop a fanbase, because many wrote off the dark content of his lyrics and imagery as shock value, while hip hop fans did not connect to Esham's albums because of his heavy metal influences.

Esham met Mastamind as a student at Osborne High School, who gave him a three-song demo tape of his music, leading the two to form the group with Esham's longtime friend, T-N-T, deciding on the name Natas, an acronym for "Nation Ahead of Time And Space". In 1991, Esham met Joseph Bruce, a member of the group Inner City Posse, who praised Esham and Reel Life Productions, and gave Esham a copy of the group's EP Dog Beats, beginning the two rappers' friendship and professional relationship.

In 1992, Natas released its first album, Life After Death on Reel Life. Following the release of this album, Esham, Natas and Reel Life Productions were the subject of much controversy when a 17-year-old fan killed himself while smoking cannabis and playing Russian roulette while listening to Life After Death.

In 1994, James was incarcerated for rape, leaving the future of Reel Life in doubt. In 1995, Reel Life began its association with the Detroit rapper Dice, who did not sign a contract with the label, but made appearances on albums by Esham, Natas and Mastamind. Reel Life released Dice's debut studio album, The Neighborhoodshittalka the following year. Dice left the label following the album's release, claiming that he received no royalties from his album, which he estimated to have sold 200,000 copies. Esham's album Dead Flowerz was the first RLP album to appear on a Billboard chart, peaking at #38 on Top R&B/Hip-Hop Albums. However, the label went bankrupt that year.

=== Rebranding as Gothom (1997–2001) ===
In June 1997, Esham rebranded Reel Life Productions as Gothom Records, and released the album Bruce Wayne: Gothom City 1987, which charted at #57 on Top R&B/Hip-Hop Albums. Esham later signed a distribution deal with Overcore, a subsidiary of Overture Music, which later became distributed by TVT Records. Gothom signed the band 20 Dead Flower Children and released their album Candy, Toy Guns & Television on June 24, 1997. The following year, Gothom signed the rap metal band The Workhorse Movement, and released the band's EP Rhythm & Soul Cartel. The following year, Gothom announced that it would release The Workhorse Movement's debut album, Sons of the Pioneers, but the band left the label and signed with Roadrunner Records, which released the album in association with Overcore, with no involvement from Gothom.

In 2001, Gothom signed The Dayton Family, and had its highest charting success with Dayton Family member Bootleg's solo release Hated By Many Loved By Few, which peaked at #174 on the Billboard 200, #6 on Independent Albums, and #38 on Top R&B/Hip-Hop Albums. Gothom achieved the most number of chart positions with Esham's Tongues, which peaked at #195 on the Billboard 200, #7 on Independent Albums, #46 on Top R&B/Hip-Hop Albums and #14 on Top Heatseekers. Tongues featured appearances by Kool Keith, The Dayton Family and Insane Clown Posse's Violent J. However, following this success, TVT and Overture went bankrupt, forcing Esham to fold RLP.

=== Psychopathic Records ===
After RLP folded, Esham signed with Psychopathic Records, releasing two solo albums before leaving that label and reforming Reel Life Productions.

=== 1st revival [2005–2011] ===
Since leaving Psychopathic, however, Esham's only charting releases have been the mixtape The Butcher Shop, which peaked at #86 on Top R&B/Hip-Hop Albums, and Sacrificial Lambz, which peaked at #42 on Top R&B/Hip-Hop Albums and #50 on Top Heatseekers. In 2009, Esham and Natas performed at the Gathering of the Juggalos. Following the event, a friend of Esham's handed Joseph Bruce a copy of Esham's album I Ain't Cha Homey, which depicted a clown committing suicide with a gun on the front cover. Bruce listened to the album and saw it as a diss towards Insane Clown Posse. While Esham claimed that the album was not a diss in his podcast, the album strained the relationship between Bruce and Esham, and the two have not spoken since its release. In 2011, Gothom released the documentary Death of an Indie Label, which was originally announced as a bonus feature on a deluxe edition of DMT Sessions, but was instead uploaded onto Gothom Inc.'s YouTube channel./>

=== 2nd revival [2013–present] ===
December 8, 2013 on his official Facebook. Esham posted a video announcing the relaunch of Reel Life Productions. Shortly after the video became popular the official website "Acidrap.com" closed with a banner saying "relaunching soon". That same day it was confirmed that the first official release on the newly relaunched Reel Life Productions would be a new Natas album. On May 17, 2014. Esham, Mastamind, and the official Natas Facebook's confirmed that the Natas reunion album "FUQERRBDY" would be released on July 15, 2014 revealing the track listing and the release of 2 promotional videos on Esham's official YouTube account.

== Artists ==
Current

Artist	Year signed	Description
Esham	—	The cofounder of Reel Life Productions, Esham (East Side Hoes And Money) is known for his hallucinogenic style of hip hop, which fuses rock-based beats and lyrics involving subjects such as death, drug use, evil, paranoia and sex. Esham refers to this style as "acid rap". Esham also serves as the current Executive Producer and after a stint in Rehab, President of Reel Life Productions.
Daniel Jordan	2008	An American rapper from the San Francisco Bay Area. He also owns the independent hip hop label "Kill All Idols Records" based out of San Francisco, CA.
Chupacabra	2011	An American rapper. Reel Life promotional materials claim that she had recently been released from a psychiatric ward before being signed to the label.
Natas	1992–1999; 2006–2009, 2014–present	A hip hop group from Detroit consisting of Esham, Mastamind and TNT. The group's name is an acronym that means both "Nation Ahead of Time And Space" and "Niggaz Ahead of Time And Space". The group officially reunited in 2013.

Former

Artist	Year(s) signed	Albums released on Reel Life Productions	Notes
Dice	1995–1996	1	An American rapper from Detroit, Michigan, Dice released the album The Neighborhoodshittalka on Reel Life, then left due to a dispute with the label.
20 Dead Flower Children	1996–2000	2	A rock band from Detroit, Michigan consisting of drummer Jason "J-Hauz" Garrison, bassist David "Dirt-E" Biganeiss, singer Dennis "D-Hauz" Hogan and guitarist Keith "The Suit" Lowers. The band released two albums on Gothom, Candy, Toy Guns & Television and their self-titled.
The Workhorse Movement	1998–2000	1	A rap metal band from Detroit, Michigan consisting of vocalist Myron, guitarist Freedom, bassist Jay and drummer Joe Mackie. The band released one EP with Gothom before signing with Roadrunner Records.
T-N-T	1992–1999; 2006–2009, 2014	—	An American rapper from Detroit, T-N-T is a founding member of NATAS, with Esham and Mastamind. A solo album, Suicide Bomber, was planned for a Spring 2009 release, but never saw a release. It was also rumored that T-N-T had retired. After the release of the new NATAS album, FUQERRBDY on July 15, 2014, during an interview on "The Australian Underground Podcast: NATAS - FUQERRBDY Edition", T-N-T stated he plans to work on some new solo material to drop in the future.
The Dayton Family	2001	3	Composed of Bootleg, Shoestring and Ghetto E at the time, the name Dayton Family derives from Dayton Avenue, one of the most crime-ridden streets in their hometown. Released solo albums on Gothom, and later signed with Hatchet House.
Doc Hollywood Hustle	2008	—	An American rapper, Doc Hollywood Hustle produced tracks for Natas. A debut album, Speaking From Experience, was planned for release. He is currently in prison. As of 2011 Doc Has Since Got Out of Prison, Released the Albums, "RLP WILL NEVER DIE" featuring 23 Tracks he made for "Speaking From Experience" And New Tracks he Made After Getting Released, And He Also Released Roth$Child Money Lp Mid 2012.
Filthy Rockwell	2008	—	An American rapper from Detroit, Filthy Rockwell produced tracks for Esham and made his solo debut on the mixtape The Butcher Shop in 2008. A debut album, Enemy of the State, was planned for a Summer 2009 release.
Poe Whosaine	2008	—	An American rapper from Detroit, Michigan. In 2009, the Gothom Inc. YouTube channel released a video to a new Poe Whosaine single, "Krayayola". An official single was never released.Later founded his own label, Whosainiyak Muzik.
Mastamind	1992–2003; 2009	3	A student at Osborne High School, where Esham attended, Mastamind gave him a three-song demo tape of his music, which led to him being signed to Reel Life Productions and joining the group Natas. Mastamind released two solo albums and an EP on the label and has since formed his own label, Toxsic Records.
DeadBoy	2010	-	The cofounder of Reel Life Productions, James Smith. He released one EP "Anubis Wisdom", featuring Esham.
King Solomon	2010	-	The cousin of Esham, appearing on some of his projects as well. He released one EP "1 Shot Deal" in 2010, which has since been mostly lost.
Swayzi	2010	-	The son of DeadBoy. He released an EP "Just Checking In". Like the others released in the 12/18/10 Acid Rap Hell Pack, this is obscure as well. The only evidence is the album cover, the music is lost.
