= Gathering of the Juggalos lineups by year =

Festival

Over the years, a variety of bands have made up the main stage and second stage lineups of the Gathering of the Juggalos, a yearly festival held by Psychopathic Records.

== Gathering of the Juggalos 2000 ==
- Main Stage:

Insane Clown Posse, Twiztid, Blaze Ya Dead Homie, Psychopathic Rydas, Project Born, Kottonmouth Kings

== Gathering of the Juggalos 2001 ==
- Main Stage:

Suicide Machines, Marz, Myzery, Psychopathic Rydas, Project Born, Three 6 Mafia, Bone Thugs-n-Harmony, Blaze Ya Dead Homie, Twiztid, Dark Lotus, Vanilla Ice, Insane Clown Posse.

== Gathering of the Juggalos 2002 ==
- Main Stage:

Primer 55, Ghoultown, Blaze Ya Dead Homie, Kittie, Dark Lotus, Anybody Killa, Zug Izland, Esham, Twiztid, Psychopathic Rydas, Mack 10, Bubba Sparxxx, Insane Clown Posse.

== Gathering of the Juggalos 2003 ==
- Main Stage:

Jumpsteady ft. Delusional, Dope, Esham, Dark Lotus, Blaze Ya Dead Homie, Zug Izland, Vanilla Ice, Twiztid, Killah Priest, Kottonmouth Kings, Anybody Killa, Bushwick Bill, Wolfpac, Insane Clown Posse.

== Gathering of the Juggalos 2004 ==
- Main Stage:

Insane Clown Posse, Twiztid, Dark Lotus, Blaze Ya Dead Homie, Anybody Killa, Esham, Jumpsteady ft. Delusional, Zug Izland, Ol' Dirty Bastard, Vanilla Ice, Kurupt, Tech N9ne, DJ Swamp, Wolfpac, Bone Thugs N Harmony,

== Gathering of the Juggalos 2005 ==
- Main Stage:

Insane Clown Posse, Twiztid, Anybody Killa, Esham, Blaze Ya Dead Homie, Jumpsteady ft. Delusional, Dark Lotus, Tech N9ne, Mack 10, 2 Live Crew, Powerman 5000, Manntis, and Mini Kiss.

== Gathering of the Juggalos 2006 ==
- Main Stage:

Axe Murder Boyz, Delusional, Blaze Ya Dead Homie, Digital Underground, Drowning Pool, F.I.L.T.H.E.E. Immigrants, Insane Clown Posse, Jumpsteady ft. Delusional and Allik, Rehab, Project Deadman, Too $hort, Twiztid, Wolfpac, Age of Reason, Vile, Dead by Wednesday, Mower, Bobaflex, Killa Kat, Intricate Unit, Dark Lotus, Rebels Without Applause.

== Gathering of the Juggalos 2007 ==
- Main Stage:

Insane Clown Posse, Twiztid, Blaze Ya Dead Homie, Boondox, Anybody Killa, Dark Lotus, Psychopathic Rydas, Ying Yang Twins, Necro, Haystak, Edifide, King Gordy, Mastamindz, Menace 2 Sobriety, Mushroomhead, Prozak, Psycho-Jesus, Zug Izland, Bone Thugs-n-Harmony, Tali Demon.

- Second Stage:

Mars, Project Born, Autopzy, Bare Knuckle Conflict, Bat on Fire (feat. Dramadeus), Bloodshot, Claas, Daville Dabris, Defekt, Dieabolik, Dr. Gigglez, God Forbid, Group Rehab, Ill E. Gal, Insane Poetry, Jason Porter, F. Dux, Killa-C, LaVey, the Lords Demons, McNastee, Point 2 Point, Russett Burbank, Ruthless, Shy One, Sutter Kain, Underworld Assassins.Murder Mic

== Gathering of the Juggalos 2008 ==
- Main Stage:

Insane Clown Posse, Twiztid, Blaze Ya Dead Homie, Boondox, Anybody Killa, Dark Lotus, Psychopathic Rydas, Three Six Mafia, Ice-T, Andrew W.K., 2 Live Crew, Afroman, Esham, King Gordy, Zug Izland, Primer 55, Awesome Dre, Durty White Boyz ft. Delusional, V Sinizter, Drainage X, Underworld Assassins

- Second Stage:

ABiCA, Amanda, A-Town Mob, Bizarre, Cellar Mannequin, Chop Shop, Claas, Darkhalf, Edifide, F2H, Foreverman, Freakz R Us, George Zelaya, H8trid, Head Hurtz, Monstarz, ill e. gal, Illuminati, J Reno, J. Sin, O Menace, Kryptik, Lo Key, Loco, Cost Ninjas, M Welkin, Madd Maxxx, Mars, Mastamindz, Menace 2 Sobriety, Muder Mic, Playaz Lounge Crew, Powerglove + Lilith Astaroth, Q Strange, R.I.A., Rachel Paul, Reverend Fang Gory, Russett Burbank, Ruthless, S.H.I., Scum, Section 8, Shane Capone, Shy One, Smokehouse Junkiez, Str8 Jacket, Straight, Slime, Subnoxious, T.O.N.E.-Z, The No Clue Crew, The Real Chaos, The Reflooko Jumbee Experience, Thirty 3 Threes, Wolfpac, Xplicit

== Gathering of the Juggalos 2009 ==
- Main Stage:

Insane Clown Posse, Twiztid, Blaze Ya Dead Homie, Boondox, Anybody Killa, Dark Lotus, Paradime, Bizarre, MC Chris, Ice Cube, Prozak, Dayton Family, Tech N9ne, Haystak, Coolio, Axe Murder Boyz, Kottonmouth Kings, Mushroomhead, Vanilla Ice, Scarface

- Second Stage:

Delusional & Durty White Boyz, T.O.N.E-z, Total Chaos, 614 Villainz, The Rude Boy, Bad Dream 17, Cid Voorheez, Nuttin Nyce, Rev Fang Gory, IlleGal, Shy One, Trip C, Project Born, Mars, Playaz Lounge Crew, Drive-By, Mizt3r Purple, Freddy Grimes, Stranger Haze, The Real Chaos, Smokey Rameriz, Ignited, Ikkurruz, Scum, Cellar Mannequin, Somkehouse Junkiez, Lo Key, Psycho Jesus, V-Sinister, Chop Shop, King Gordy, Wolfpac, 7th Layer, H8tred, Hagerstown Skeez, Head Hurtz Monstars, Unstable, Swollen Members, The Dirtball, Big B, Claas, AJAX, Awesome Dre, J Reno, Psychopathic Rydas, CRSMN, Illuninati, Loco, Jim Kanklez, Os7, Bankrupt Records, Trackula

- Freakshow Tent:

Hed PE, Detroit Voodoo, Menace 2 Sobriety, Motown Rage, Left4Dead, Lithium, Onyx, Zug Izland, Bat on Fire, Drainage X, Gwar.

== Gathering of the Juggalos 2010 ==
- Main Stage:

Insane Clown Posse, Twiztid, Blaze Ya Dead Homie, Boondox, Anybody Killa, Dark Lotus, Psychopathic Rydas, Claas, V-Sinister, Menace 2 Sobriety, Awesome Dre, Above The Law, Naughty by Nature, The Dayton Family, Warren G, Kottonmouth Kings, Axe Murder Boyz, Brotha Lynch Hung, Tech N9ne, Spice 1, Rehab, Method Man & Redman

- Second Stage:

Gangs of Green, 17ent, Rhythmic 3, Defekt, Pain, 7th Layer, Smokehouse Junkiez, King Gordy, AJAX, Big B, Afroman, Troubled Mindz, D Murder, Nyland & Dex, Nuttin Nyce, Mizt3r Pruple, Freddy Grimes, Ikkurruz, Trip C, Miss Kisa, LiL V, Ill E. Gal, Tila Tequila, Dmize, 614 Villainz, Trackula, Os7, Head Hurtz Monstars, Scum, Whitney Peyton, J Reno, Mars, Mastamind, Prozak, Coolio, OushaBoo, Project Assassins, Pimp on Wheels, Loco, Unstable, Rev Fang Gory, Virus, Liquid Assassin, Tone Lōc, Rob Base

- Freakshow Tent:

Russett Burbank, Critical Bill, Kung Fu Vampire, Blue Felix, Sid Wilson, Vanilla Ice, Psychostick, Villebillies, Wolfpac, Lil Wyte, Hed PE.

== Gathering of the Juggalos 2011 ==
- Main Stage:

Insane Clown Posse, Twiztid, Blaze Ya Dead Homie, Anybody Killa, Boondox, The Dayton Family, Dark Lotus, CKY, DJ Quik, Kottonmouth Kings, Juvenile, Mystikal, Kittie, George Clinton & Parliament-Funkadelic, MC Hammer, Tech N9ne, E-40, Paris, Dope, Saliva, Vanilla Ice, Xzibit, Ice Cube, Busta Rhymes, Lil Jon, Paul Wall (did not show/mix up with booking), Hed PE, Mastamind, Potluck, Charlie Sheen.

- Underground Stage:

Boo Clan, Psychopathic Rydas, Axe Murder Boyz, Wolfpac, Mars, Kung Fu Vampire, Open Mind Productions, Menace 2 Sobriety, Ajax, Downtown Brown, Mic Lordz & Sauce Funky, Critical Bill, Project Born, Lil Wyte, Liquid Assassin, Psycho Jesus, Smokehouse Junkiez, CLAAS, V-Sinizter, Prozak, King Gordy, Ikkurruz, SCUM, OUSHABOO, Unstable, F. Dux, AJ Jordan, the Crescendo So Sick Social Club, Molly Gruesome, Doe Dubbla, Deadly Poisons, Hopsin, Prescription RX, JFE BOYZ, 17 ENT, DMIZE.

- Special Stage:

Bobby Brown

== Gathering of the Juggalos 2012 ==
- Main Stage:

Insane Clown Posse, Twiztid, Blaze Ya Dead Homie, Anybody Killa, Cold 187um, Dark Lotus, Psychopathic Rydas, Geto Boys, Tech N9ne, George Clinton & Parliament-Funkadelic, Mushroomhead, Rehab, Soulfly, Danny Brown, Slaine, Motown Rage, Zug Izland, Myzery, P.O.D., Swollen Members, Hed PE, Kottonmouth Kings, Static-X, Mack 10, Get It Together, Fear Factory, Kool Keith, Onyx, Millionaires (group), Master P, Prozak, ¡Mayday!, Jumpsteady, Rude Boy, Ric Flair

- Violent J's West Side Party:

The Pharcyde, Lil Eazy-E, Warren G, Glasses Malone.

- Shaggy 2 Dope & DJ Clay's Beast of The East:

Raekwon, The Fat Boys, Rahzel, Biz Markie,

- Twiztid's Dirty Dirty Party:

Rittz, Lil Wyte, Haystak & JellyRoll, Project Pat, Lil Jon.

- Comedy Stage:

Upchuck The Clown, Cheech & Chong, Ralphie May, Bobcat Goldthwait, Jamie Kennedy, MK

- Late Night:

Awesome Dre, Bizarre, King Gordy, Wolfpac, Doe Dubbla, The Dayton Family, AJAX, Mars, ClAas, F. Dux, Smokehouse Junkiez, Twisted Insane, Mastamind, Liquid Assassin, Axe Murder Boyz, Bukshot, Kesto, So Sick Social Club, Critical Bill, Downtown Brown, Sleep Tastes Pretty, Menace II Sobriety

- Underground Stage Daytime:

Insane Poetry, Scum, Madness Has Boy, Dagda, Chief, Odd Fellaz, Gritty, Kayla K, Nukie the Carpathio, J Dirty, AJ Jordan, Blind Insanity, So High Clique, Stranger Haze, Fury, Mass Murderaz, Daniel Dahmer, Azylum Inmates, Sedated, Dark Half, Wicked Wayz, Dirty Adville, Bobby Sick, 10/31, Troll, Luni Spade, DeJangles, Os7, Dopesic, Chop Shop, Str8Jaket, Jimi Kanklez, Flagrant, Ikkurruz, Sixx Digit, Unstable, The MF'n Dirty, O Villianz, Freddy Grimes, Molly Gruesome, Ryan Ho, Sketch, Bobby Sick, Political Assassin, D. Evil/Uncle Phoenix.

== Gathering of the Juggalos 2013 ==
- Main Stage: Insane Clown Posse, Twiztid, Blaze Ya Dead Homie, Anybody Killa, Psychopathic Rydas, Boondox, Zug Izland, Vanilla Ice, Kottonmouth Kings, Dizzy Wright, Lil Wyte, Rahzel, Master P, ¡Mayday!, Sevendust, Tech N9ne, Brotha Lynch Hung, Soulfly, Rehab, Rittz, Swollen Members.
- Freakshow Stage: Dark Lotus, Drive-By, Legz Diamond, King Krimzon, Smackola, Wolfpac, Onyx, Whitney Peyton, T.O.N.E.-z, Big B, Ill E. Gal, Mars, Myzery, Aqualeo, Lil Eazy-E, Poe Whosaine, Blowfly, Kung Fu Vampire, Slaine, Potluck.
- Underground Stage: Axe Murder Boyz, Blind Insanity, Cash Amigo, Osirus, Beast Mode, Hazmat E.T.G., Kegan Ault, Ill Wit It, Wildcard, Insane Eric, 7 Second Suicide, Freddy Grimes, Haystak, Alphamatic, Dirty Advile, Insane Poetry, Prescription, Will D.O.B., Draztik, Super Smash Bros, Bukshot, JellyRoll, Krizz Kaliko, Wazteland Warriorz, T.O.S., Krak Rok, Murdaface, Sixx Digit, Razorz Edge, Mastamind, ClaAs, Buckwheat Gators, The Underground Avengers, Seth Brock, Fury, Tre LB, Demented, Pixy, Sketch, Southside Hatchet Swingin'Mob, Origix & DC, Project Born, Psycho Realm, Kletuz Karnage Cassidy, Randum, Hostile 6, Cykoskifrantik, Izzy Dunafore, Pimp On Wheels, 17 Ent., Sedated, The Deadly Medly.

== Gathering of the Juggalos 2014 ==
- Big Top Stage: Insane Clown Posse, Twiztid, Blaze Ya Dead Homie, Anybody Killa, Boondox, Axe Murder Boyz, Dark Lotus, Big Hoodoo, Wolfpac, Ces Cru, Biohazzard, Tech N9ne, Whitney Peyton, Cannibal Corpse, Yelawolf, Caskey, Da Mafia 6ix, Kottonmouth Kings, Dizzy Wright, Madchild, Cypress Hill, Hopsin.
- Carousel Stage: Stevie Stone, Zug Izland, Lil Wyte, (hed) p.e., Twisted Insane, JellyRoll, La Coka Nostra, Psychopathic Rydas, Razakel & Sicktanic, Bone Crusher, The Underground Avengers, Wayne Static, Jarren Benton, Motown Rage, Johnny Richter, Shock G.
- Pendulum Stage: Insane Eric, Razorz Edge, Smokehouse Junkiez, AJAX, Insane Poetry, Scum, Mr. Grey, Mr. Liqz, P Win, Dark Half, DurtE, Young Lyte, Crucifix, Wildcard, Spaide Ripper, Cryptic Wisdomno emotion goldmask, Hiway,

== Gathering of the Juggalos 2015 ==
- Main Stage: Insane Clown Posse, Twiztid, Blaze Ya Dead Homie, Anybody Killa, Axe Murder Boyz, Boondox, Dark Lotus, Big Hoodoo, Kottonmouth Kings, Hopsin, Tech N9ne, Aqualeo, Puddle of Mudd, Flosstradamus, Jarren Benton, Potluck, Dope D.O.D., In This Moment, Rittz, Mushroomhead, Waka Flocka Flame, Machine Gun Kelly.
- Carousel Stage: Terror Universal, 50 Shades Of Snuff, Neurotic November, Ho99o9, Zug Izland, Stitches, Da Mafia 6ix, Myzery, King 810, Twista, Psychopathic Rydas, Ill Nino, Nova Rockafeller, Wolfpac, Madchild.
- Pendulum Stage: Ill P., My Brothers Keeper, U.F.C., Thugstar, T-Ryde, TripC, T.M.R., S. King, Illest U. Freeze, Molly Gruesome, Liquid Assassin, Trizz, S. Muskey, (DIM), G-Mo Skee, Playboy Tha Beast, J.P.K., Halfrican, Travis S., Bulletproof, A.Z., Windy City, D. Menace, Sketchy C., F. Dox, Amerikan Overdose, Swag Toof, Lo Key, J. Ledger, City Limits, Moonmen, Stenjoddi, Snake iiz, Wil & Rabbid, Str8jaket.
- JCW Stage: Danny Kae, Deadly Medly.

== Gathering of the Juggalos 2016 ==
- Big Top Stage: Insane Clown Posse, Twiztid, Blaze Ya Dead Homie, Anybody Killa, Boondox, Ces Cru, Suicide Silence, Rittz, Tech N9ne, Bukshot, Kissing Candice, Kottonmouth Kings, Gwar, One-Eyed Doll, Lil Wyte, Attila, Asking Alexandria, (hed) p.e., Emmure, JellyRoll, Hopsin, Bone Thugs-N-Harmony.
- Carousel Stage: UPS, Scare Don't Fear, Black Flag Music, Kung Fu Vampire, The Dayton Family, Axe Murder Boyz, Big Hoodoo, Esham, Whitney Peyton, !Mayday¡, Young Wicked, Dark Lotus, Lex "The Hex" Master, Wolfpac, Slick Rick, The Killjoy Club.
- Pendulum Stage: B. Scan, Molly Gruesome, Project Born, Green Jellÿ, Famz and the Hooliganz, Ninja G, Dead Eye, Enasnimi, 614 Villainz, JPK, J Dub, SSB & Southside Hatchet Swingin Mob, #Behemoth, Alla Xul Elu, Sedated, UFO, Gypsy, Frodo The G, G-Mike, Ill Phil, Lowercase J, Sewerside, Skitzo, Ill, Ascent To, Lo Key, The R.O.C., Stoner Jordan.

== Gathering of the Juggalos 2017 ==
- Diamond Stage: Insane Clown Posse, Anybody Killa, DJ Clay, Big Hoodoo, Lyte, Vanilla Ice, Psychostick, Madchild, Mushroomhead, Kissing Candice, Kung Fu Vampire, Cage, Dope, Lyrical Snuff Productions, Upon A Burning Body, ¡Mayday!, Waka Flocka Flame, Zug Izland, JellyRoll, P.O.D., Prof.
- Red Moon Stage: Shaggy 2 Dope, Skitzo, Murder Musick, Bukshot, Native World Inc., V-Sinizter, Flaw, September Mourning, Green Jellÿ, Wolfpac, American Grim, Lil Debbie, Miss May I, R.A. the Rugged Man, The Browning, Froggy Fresh, Myzery, Insane Poetry, Brotha Lynch Hung
- Chaos Stage: Sup3rsayin, Headshot Louie, Ronnie Blaze, JPK, Body Bag Syndikate, Chop Shop, Wiked Wood, P.R.E.A.C.H., SSB, Alla Xul Elu, Sewerside, #Baconnomics, T-Ryde, Wil E. Haze, Str8jaket, Beast Motion
- The Madhouse Stage: A.Z. The Fallen, Van Brando, Skull Kidz, Zitro, King Irish, Mr?E, 5th Power, Kaos Anubis, MC Viruz, Optymus Music, Chiiirp, Statik G, McNastee, Louis Cheese, Roach Joka, Youngster Jji, Bake Lo, Madopelli Music, State Of Krisis, Bulletproof The Fool, LSP Snuff Blender,

== Gathering of the Juggalos 2018 ==
- Big Top Stage: Anybody Killa, Big Hoodoo, Insane Clown Posse (performing a regular set, and The Wraith: Hell's Pit in its entirety), DJ Clay, Lyte, Ouija Macc, Yelawolf, Gwar, CKY, Grateful Dead (tribute band), Janis Joplin (tribute band), Jimi Hendrix (tribute band), Santana (tribute band), R.A. the Rugged Man, Esham, Attila, Immortal Technique, Hopsin, JellyRoll, Wolfpac, Tech N9ne, Butcher Babies, King Iso, Lyrikal Snuff Productions (Scum, Liquid Assassin, Smallz One, Damien Quinn), Myzery and Zug Izland.

- Carousel Stage:

The Killjoy Club, Kingspade, Mac Lethal, Seed of 6ix, Menace 2 Sobriety, Pound The Pavement House Party, Motown Rage, The Dirtball, Native World Inc. (Anybody Killa, Freddy Grimes, Flagrant, Ed Smash, Mad V, Mr. Y.U.G.), Dirty Machine, Alla Xul Elu, LSP's MMMFD (Scum & Insane Poetry), Kissing Candice, Mike Busey, MC Lars.

- Pendulum Stage:
- Day:

Anarchy Bronze, Big Buzz, Cemetery High, Chiiirp, EL-SD, Frodo The Ghost, Goest Ryder, Humble Lunatic, Joey Cough, Konspiracy Kamp, Lowercase J, Miss Cyanide, Novatore, Poet, Purple Hearts, Razorz Edge, Ronnie Blaze, Stoner Jordan, T.H.C. (The Heart of Cleveland) and Tommy Traina.

- Night:

10/31, Beyond Top Secret, Dizasterpiece, Glitter Moneyyy, Griinch Muzic (Bake Lo, Histio and Zitro), Ill E. Gal, JPK, Manganelli, Mi$ta 420, Open Minded, P.R.E.A.C.H., Ya Ya The Gremlin.

- Seminar Tent: A Dandy Punk, Clownvis Presley.
- Sideshows: Juggalo Show (Live), Peep This Shit Stage, The R-Rated Circus Sideshow, The Hooded Magician, Freakshow Deluxe, The Sickening Skin Suspension Show, Big Money Hu$tlas Extravaganza.

- Seminars:
- Violent J's Motivational Speech – Thursday 2-3pm
- Anybody Killa – Thursday 4-5pm
- Big Hoodoo – Friday 4-5pm
- Insane Clown Posse – Saturday 2-3pm
- Lyte & Ouija Macc – Saturday 4-5pm

- Other Freshness: Carnival Rides, Dark Carnival Tarot Card Readings, Psychopathic Auction, Juggalo Auction, Autographs.

- Autographs:
- Big Hoodoo & DJ Clay – Thursday 4-6pm
- JCW – Friday 12-2pm
- Insane Clown Posse – Friday 2-4pm
- Lyte & Ouija Macc – Friday 4-6pm
- Dark Carnival Games – Saturday 12-2pm
- Anybody Killa & Native World Inc. – Saturday 4-6pm

== Gathering of the Juggalos 2019 ==
- Soopa Stage:

Insane Clown Posse, Jumpsteady, Bone Thugs-n-Harmony, Butcher Babies, Ghostemane, Geto Boys, Gilbert Gottfried, Gwar, Jedi Mind Tricks, KRS-One, Mac Sabbath, Morris Day and the Time, Randy's Cheeseburger Picnic, Rittz, Suicideboys, Soopa Villainz Tech N9ne, Token, Morris Day, Slyer, Gorilla Pimp, Dropout Kings

- Shazam Stage:

Anybody Killa, Astronautalis, BIG HOOHOO, Blahzay Roze, Brokencyde, C+C Music Factory, C-Mob, Clownvis Presley, City Morgue, Cybertronic Spree, DJ Clay, Dropout Kings, Eazy Mac, Esham, GFM, Hav Knots, ICP's Drums & Strums, Kingspade, Kung Fu Vampire, Like A Villain, Lyte, Madchild, Mike Busey, Moneyside Musica, Motown Rage, Mushroomhead, Myzery, Odd Squad Family, Ouija Macc, Preach, Rehab, The Rude Boy, Sabu Sandman, September Mourning, Shakewell, Shane Douglas, Sylar, The Convalescence, Tommy Dreamer, Twisted Insane, Whitney Peyton, Willie Mack, Wolfpac, Zug Izland, Vinnie Paz, Deviant Horror

== Gathering of the Juggalos 2021 ==
- Bedlam Stage

Insane Clown Posse, BIG HOODOO, Chris Hansen, Danny Brown, DJ Paul, Freewill, ICP's Bizzar Bizaar Show, Kid 'n Play, King 810, Lardi B, NASCAR Aloe, 9 Dead, Ouija Macc, R.A. the Rugged Man, Raven Black, Rude Boy & DJ Carlito, Steve-O, Vanilla Ice, Whitney Peyton, Zitro, Clownvis, DJ Chunk, Devereaux, Dropout Kings

- Clown Drip Stage

Blahzay Roze, The Dayton Family, DJ Clay, Myzery, Project Born, Shaggy The Airhead, V Sinizter, Hexxx, Cody Manson, Derrty Shirt, Double Homicide, Ezekiel, Gnarcotix, Hex Rated, Isolated Beingz, Jakk Faust, J Biz R, J Payne, Klokwerk E, Knowledge Da MC, La Purp, Open Minded, Problemattik, Rouges Gallery, S.O.N., Sewerside, Side Weighs, Skitzo, SSB, Tierre Diaz, Wiked Wood, and Whiskey n Water.

== Gathering of the Juggalos 2022 ==
- Joke Ya Mind Stage

Insane Clown Posse, Ouija Macc, Fat Nick, KRS-One, Odd Squad Family, HEXXX, The X-Ecutioners, Large Professor, The Future Kingz, Mike E. Clark, Freewill, In Dying Arms, LSP's Gorehounds of Snuff, Mereness, Super Famous Funtime Guys, The Hatchet Man Project, Babytron, Egyptian Lover, In Dying Arms, Pouya, Roadside Ghost, Sir Mix-A-Lot, Slick Rick, Steel Panther, The Cybertronic Spree, Tre LB, #BPTF, Fat C, Wiked Wood

- Nightmare Stage

Big Hoodoo, Esham, HO99O9, Scythe Gang 666, Mushroomhead, American Overdose, Dana Dentata, Green Jelly, Group Home, HB The Grizzly, Legz Diamond, Lorentz, Madd Maxxx, Reverend Television, Motown Rage, Onyx, Skitzo, Wicked Wayz, 386 Music, Clooner, Famz and the Hooliganz, Ghoulaveli, Grimm, Hitman Chris, Ill Fortune, Like A Villain, McNastee, Politicize, Professor Fresh, Really Bad People, Riddy K, Sex Waffles, The Psykoloz, Tricky Youth, Wild Bill, Yahz (Ka-Hopi), Zigzvck, MC Lars

== Gathering of the Juggalos 2023 ==
- Intergalactic Stage

Insane Clown Posse, Ouija Macc, KRS-One, HEXXX, Alien Ant Farm, Arrested Development, City Morgue, Krizz Kaliko, Dropout Kings, Natas, Hatchet Man Project, Kung Fu Vampire, Mac Sabbath, Riff Raff, Rittz, Sponge, Sugarhill Gang, Whitney Peyton, YelaWolf, Zackass, 9 Dead, Al Mal, Freeze Martian, Juggalo Cypher Live, Klokwerk E, Korihor, Normundy The 6ix

- Martian Stage

D-Loc, Freewill, Lardi B, Madchild, Nekrogoblikona, R.A. the Rugged Man with DJ Lala, Raven Black, Shakewell, Abstrakt, Babble The Demon, Barz!, Belushi Speedball, Benny Buttons, Big Fluff, Darby O' Trill, Facetatmami, Freeze MF, GunnerB, Heathensun, JVNEBVG, Kace Cayne, Kingsmen, Matt Foy, NGS, Redefind, Rob Zilla, Seenloc, Shilow, Summoner's Circle, The Coursing, The God Bombs, Tierre Diaz, Trey Magic With Splice (Doctors of Doom), TSO Ghostly, Wil E. & Faygo Gang, Zitro, ZOMBI3CULT

== Gathering of the Juggalos 2024 ==
- Macabre Stage

Darby O’Trill, Mastamind, Dayton Family, Merkules, $alamander X, Twisted Insane, Ganxsta N-I-P, Rakim, Kim Dracula, Ouija Macc, Grimm, Bleed the Wicked Menace, Vended, DJ Paul, Static-X, Insane Clown Posse

- Omen Stage

Rook Mewsick, Bazooka Sharkz, Jordon Stepp, Dying Oath, Bible Belt Massacre, S.O.N Midnight, Smallz One, V-Sinizter, The Hooliganz, Cartoon Bondurant, Posezur, Trauma 2sick, Percy Bones, Saint Diablo, Our Inner Circle, Scream at the Sky, Ummo, Monster Wolf, Galactic Empire, King Gordy, Kreaturelagoth, Looney’s Tunez, Showmegod, King Wicked, Corvin’s Breed, Mikey Rotten, A Killer’s Confession, Kung Fu Vampire, Scythe Gang 666, Wakko the Kid, Wildcard, The Unforgiven, xEighty-Sixedx, The Lapp

== Gathering of the Juggalos 2025 ==
- Legendary Stage

¡MAYDAY!, Belushi Speed Ball, Bone Thugs-n-Harmony, Fight from Within, Gwar, Insane Clown Posse, Ill Bill, Immortal Technique, King Iso, Lardi B, Motown Rage, Normundy, Odd Squad Family, Onyx, Ouija Macc, R.A. the Rugged Man, Smile on the Sinner, Stacc Styles, Tech N9ne, Three 6 Mafia, Tierre Diaz, Waka Flocka Flame, Wakko the Kid

- Iconic Stage

Champtown and the Big and Stout Band, Darby O’Trill, Freewill, Green Jelly, Kottonmouth Kings, Mary Tyler Whores, Midnightinyami, Mushroomhead, Myzery, ShaggyTheAirhead, The Convalescence, Thicc Criss, Actus Reus, Al Mal AKA Adocwake, Bodies Below Sea Level, Bondbreakr, Donnie Menace, Foty Oz, Gloom, Hatchet Mountain Rising, K7 Army, Madd Maxxx, Mantra of Morta, Moppy, Redburn, Resistor, Saving Vice, Set for the Fall, Sewerside, Siamese Goat God, Sinizter, Skitzo, Squid Pisser, Vlad’s Skeletal Circus, Wiked Wood, Wild Bill,
