= Gathering of the Juggalos =

Annual music festival in the US

- Gathering of the Juggalos 2015 banner
- Genre: Hip hop; rock; heavy metal; funk
- Dates: Varies annually
- Venue: Novi Expo Center (2000); Seagate Convention Centre (2001); Peoria Civic Center (2002); Nelson Ledges Quarry Park (2003-2005); Frontier Ranch (2006); Hogrock Campgrounds (2007-2013); Legend Valley (2014-2016, 2018, 2021-2025); Shimmer Forest (2019); Mother Nature's Riverfront Retreat
- Locations: Novi, Michigan (2000); Toledo, Ohio (2001); Peoria, Illinois (2002); Garrettsville, Ohio (2003–2005); Pataskala, Ohio (2006); Cave-In-Rock, Illinois (2007–2013); Thornville, Ohio (2014–2016, 2018, 2021–2025); Oklahoma City, Oklahoma (2017); Springville, Indiana (2019); Macks Creek, Missouri (2026–present)
- Years active: 2000–2019, 2021–present
- Founders: Jumpsteady, Insane Clown Posse
- Website: Official website

The Gathering of the Juggalos (also known as The Gathering or GOTJ) is an annual music festival put on by Psychopathic Records, featuring performances by the entire label roster as well as numerous well-known musical groups and underground artists. It was founded by Jumpsteady, Insane Clown Posse (Joseph Bruce and Joseph Utsler), and their label in 2000. Described by Joseph Bruce as a "Juggalo Woodstock" (Juggalo being a nickname for fans of the Insane Clown Posse), the Gathering of the Juggalos spans five days and includes concerts, wrestling, games, contests, autograph sessions, karaoke, and seminars with artists. Over its first eleven events (2000–2010), the festival drew a total attendance upward of 100,000 fans.

== History ==
=== Early years (2000–2002) ===
The Gathering of the Juggalos was created in 1999 when Rob Bruce organized an event for all Juggalos, a concept long talked about by Insane Clown Posse. The first Gathering took place in Novi, Michigan at the Novi Expo Center on July 21–22, 2000, with roughly 2,000 fans in attendance. The festival featured concert performances, autograph sessions, seminars, wrestling hosted by Juggalo Championshit Wrestling, tattooing, a haunted house, video games, contests, an ICP memorabilia museum and more.

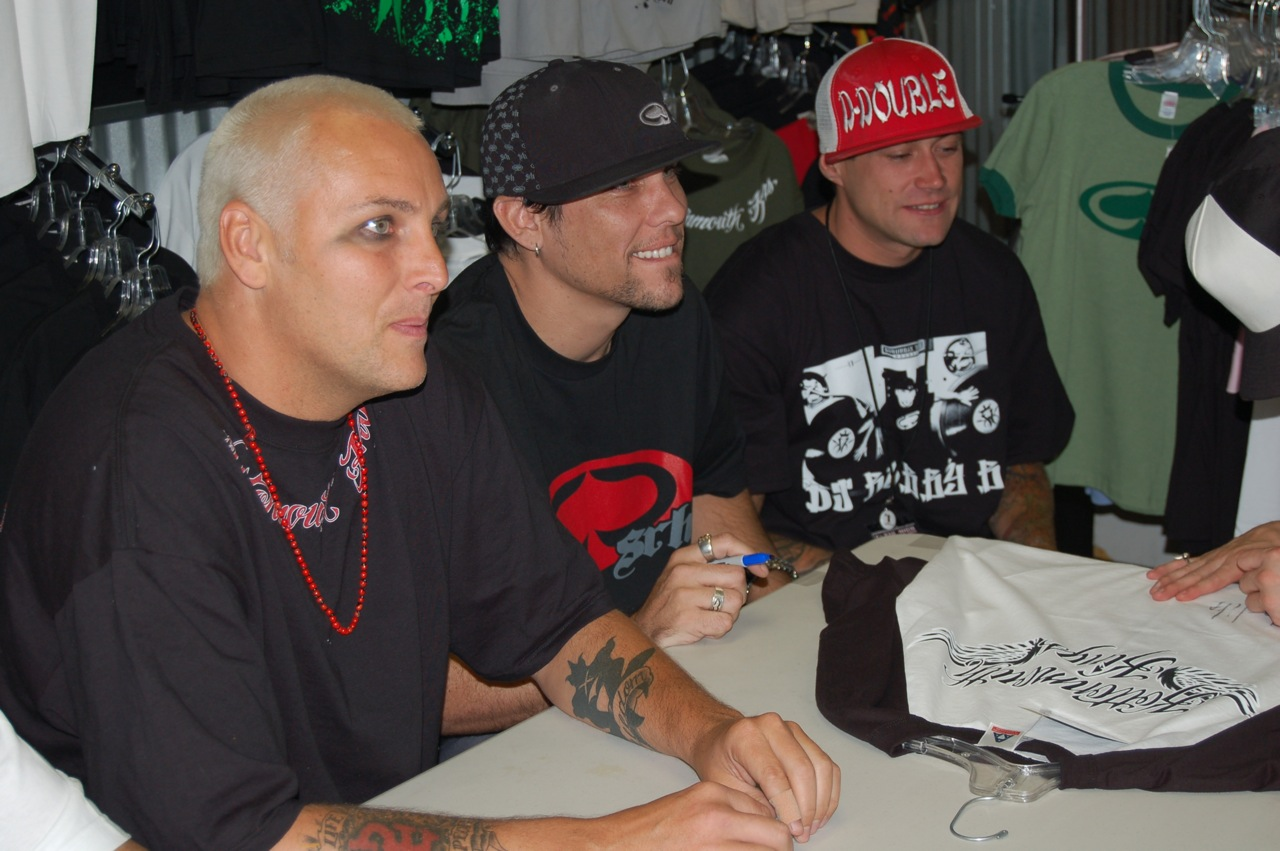
Kottonmouth Kings performed at the first festival and numerous others since

The lineup included performances by Insane Clown Posse, Twiztid, Blaze Ya Dead Homie, Psychopathic Rydas, Project Born, and Kottonmouth Kings. While performing on the final night, Insane Clown Posse asked the Juggalos to join them onstage, and about 300 fans rushed onto the stage. After performing for almost 30 more minutes, the concert was abruptly stopped by the venue's management.

The second Gathering of the Juggalos was held in Toledo, Ohio at the SeaGate Convention Centre on July 13–15, 2001, with approximately 6,600 in attendance. Outside artists included The Suicide Machines, Marz, Three 6 Mafia, Vanilla Ice, and Bone Thugs-n-Harmony. Juggalo Championshit Wrestling hosted several matches, with the main event pitting Sabu against Vampiro for the JCW Heavyweight Championship.

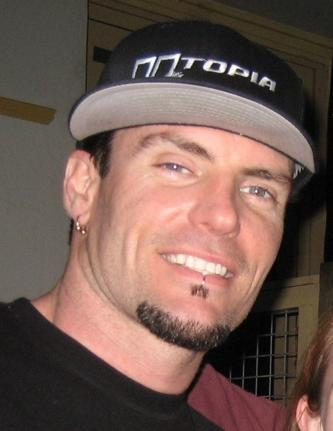
Vanilla Ice performed at the second Gathering of the Juggalos and many others since

Like the previous year, hundreds of fans charged the main stage during Insane Clown Posse's performance. However, this time the group was forced to flee the stage before it collapsed. The festival ended early before the duo could reveal their Sixth Joker's Card. The next day, local newspapers reported the rush as a "riot".

The third annual Gathering of the Juggalos was held in the Civic Center in Peoria, Illinois July 19–21, 2002, with over 8,000 in attendance. Esham, Ghoultown, Mack 10, Primer 55, and Bubba Sparxxx were among the guest performers. Bubba Sparxxx was booed offstage and has since left a mark on future Gatherings, as acts sharing similar fates have been said to receive the "Bubba Sparxxx award." Esham announced at the event that he had signed with Psychopathic Records. The Sixth Joker's Card was unveiled in two separate seminars, The Wraith: Shangri-La and Hell's Pit, given by Violent J. The second seminar, detailing Insane Clown Posse's entire rise to fame, was captured on video and released with The Wraith: Shangri-La on DVD.

A riot occurred after police tried to stop female attendees from showing their breasts. The police released tear gas and pepper balls into the surrounding crowd, causing mass confusion. Psychopathic Records employees Rob Bruce and Alex Abbiss negotiated with police, and the festival continued after airing out for 30 minutes.

=== Expansion and development (2003–2006) ===
In 2003, the Juggalo Gathering was held outdoors for the first time. The event took place at Nelson Ledges Quarry Park, known as "the Crystal Forest", near Garrettsville, Ohio in Nelson Township, July 17–20. It was also the first time the festival went on for 24 hours every day. Guest performers included Bushwick Bill, Dope, and Killah Priest. In addition to the wrestling matches, Mad Man Pondo hosted Mad Man Pondo's Wrestling School. Though multiple police were called to watch over the event by Garrettsville residents, the Gathering went off without any problems.

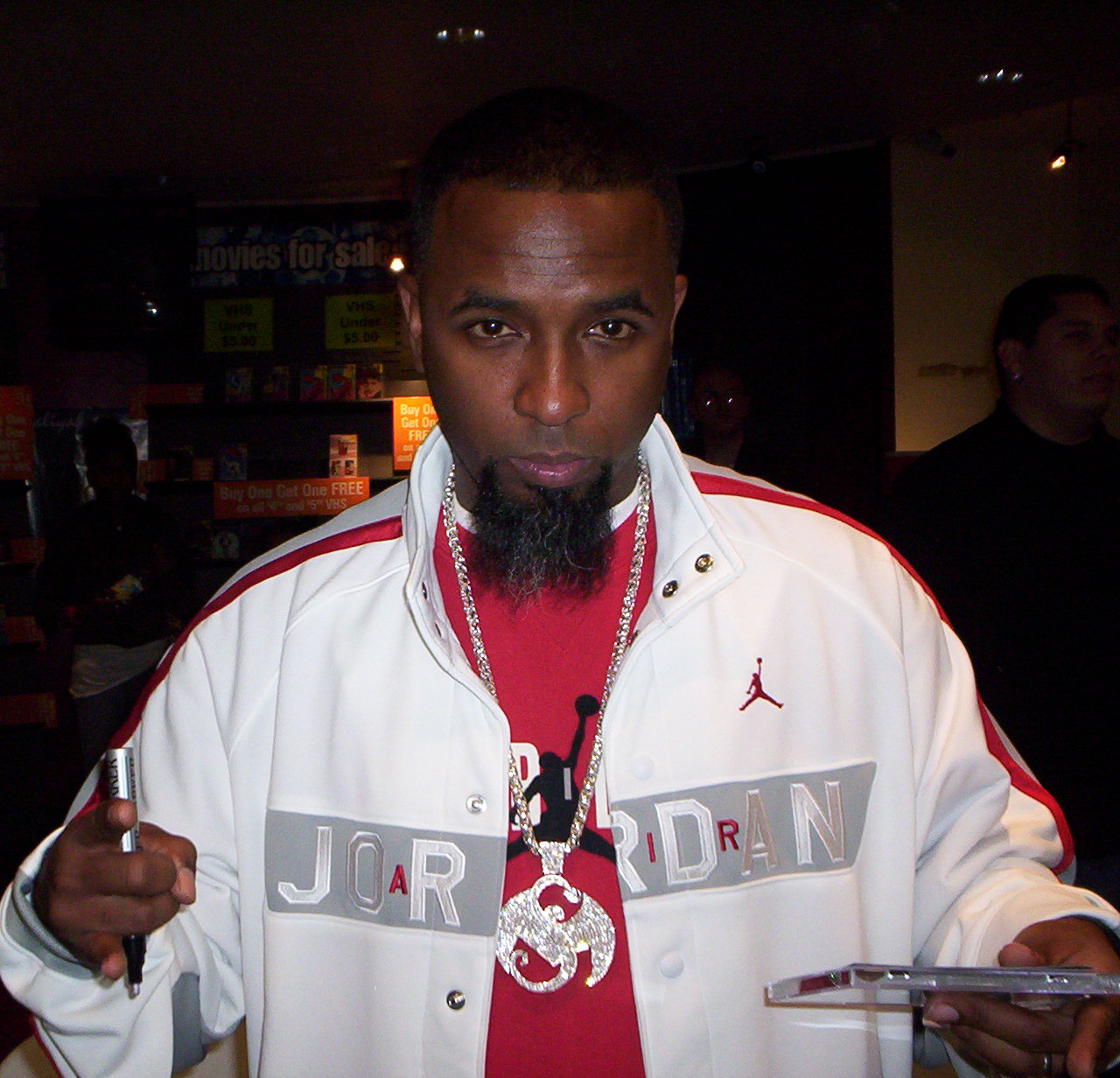
Tech N9ne has become a staple performer of the festival since 2004

The fifth annual Gathering of the Juggalos returned to Garrettsville July 15–18, with over 5,000 in attendance. Ol' Dirty Bastard, Kurupt, Tech N9ne, and Wolfpac were among those who performed. Kurupt got booed off the stage by the attendees and retaliated by throwing a microphone into the audience. Bone Thugs-n-Harmony also reunited for the first time in several months by making a surprise performance on opening night. Juggalo Championship Wrestling hosted matches every day, and featured several established wrestlers.

The Gathering of the Juggalos returned to Garrettsville for a third time in 2005 on July 21–24. Guest performers included 2 Live Crew, Powerman 5000, Manntis, and Mini Kiss. Charlie Murphy was also brought in as one of the stand-up comedians. The Gathering hosted the final round of the Underground Psychos contest, in which the winner, Axe Murder Boyz, was signed to Psychopathic Records. Juggalo Championship Wrestling held the event "JCW vs. TNA" which pitted JCW wrestlers against TNA wrestlers.

Quarry Park's owner, Evan Kelley, kicked the festival off his grounds later that year. He stated, "Psychopathic Records broke some of the rules set down for the 2005 event, including blasting music all night long." He also explained that "Drugs, alcohol, nudity, profanity, and trash also became serious problems."

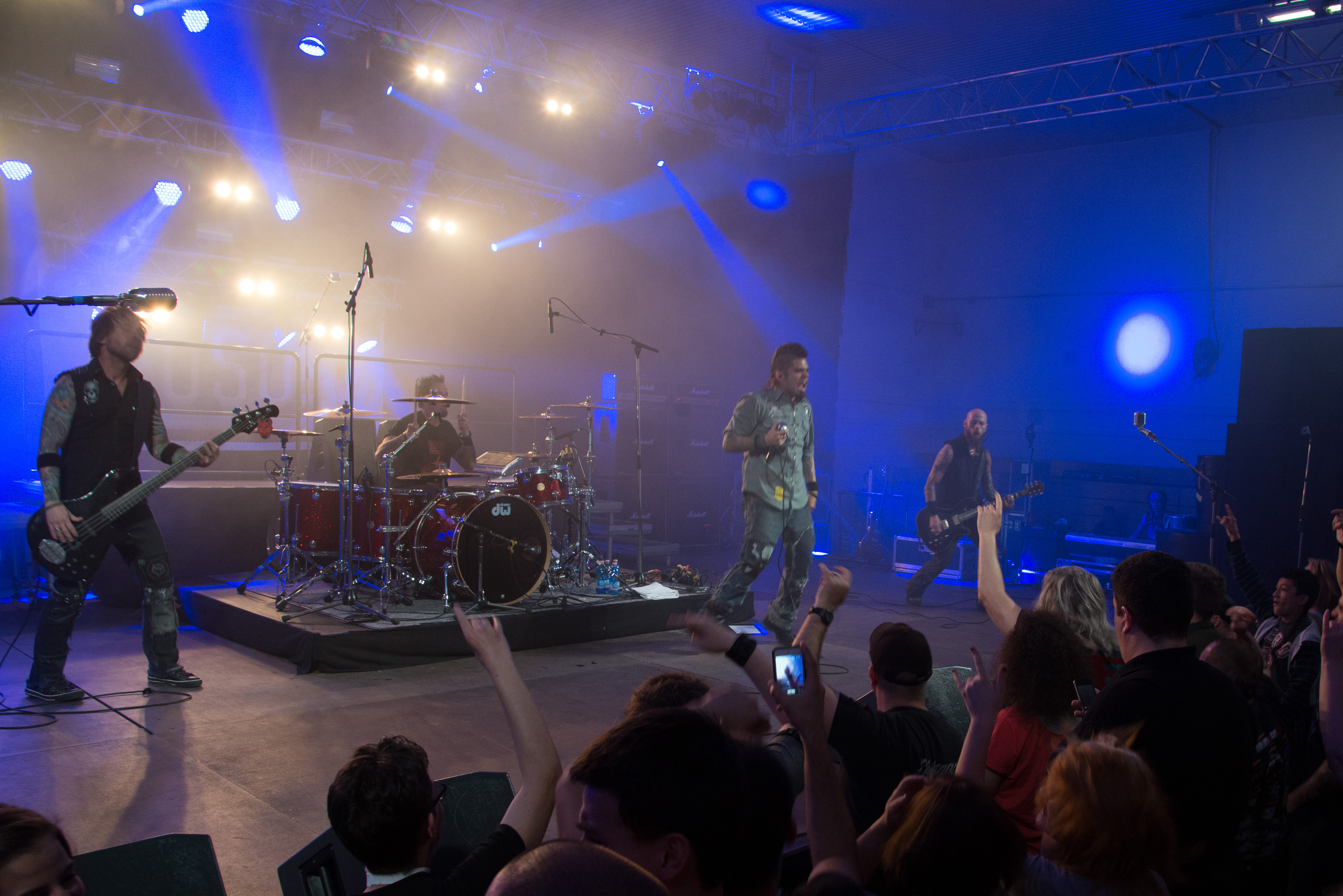
Drowning Pool performed at the festival in 2006

The seventh annual Gathering of the Juggalos was set to take place at the Michigan International Speedway in Brooklyn, Michigan, however, the board of Woodstock Township, Michigan denied the label the permits needed to hold the event. On April 18, Psychopathic Records announced that the Gathering would be held in Pataskala, Ohio at Frontier Ranch July 13–16, 2006. The festival featured over 100 bands. Those playing at the main and second stages included Drowning Pool, Digital Underground, Rehab, Too $hort, Intricate Unit, Bobaflex, and Vile.

=== Cave-In-Rock (2007–2013) ===
Cave-In-Rock, Illinois hosted the eighth Gathering of the Juggalos at Hogrock Campgrounds on August 9–12, 2007, with over 8,000 fans attending the four-day event. Like the previous year, over 100 bands were featured. Performances on the main and second stages included Ying Yang Twins, Necro, Haystak, Zug Izland, Prozak, Mushroomhead, and Insane Poetry. Comedians included Joey Gay. Bloodymania, the culmination of Juggalo Championship Wrestling's web show, SlamTV!, debuted at the event. Anybody Killa was also announced to have signed back with Psychopathic Records.

Cave-In-Rock also hosted the ninth Gathering of the Juggalos on August 7–10, 2008, which included guest performances by Afroman, Andrew W.K., Ice-T, and Bizarre. Both Bloodymania II and the debut of Oddball Wrestling was presented by Juggalo Championship Wrestling. The Gathering was filmed by Psychopathic Video for the documentary A Family Underground, which was released on May 12, 2009.

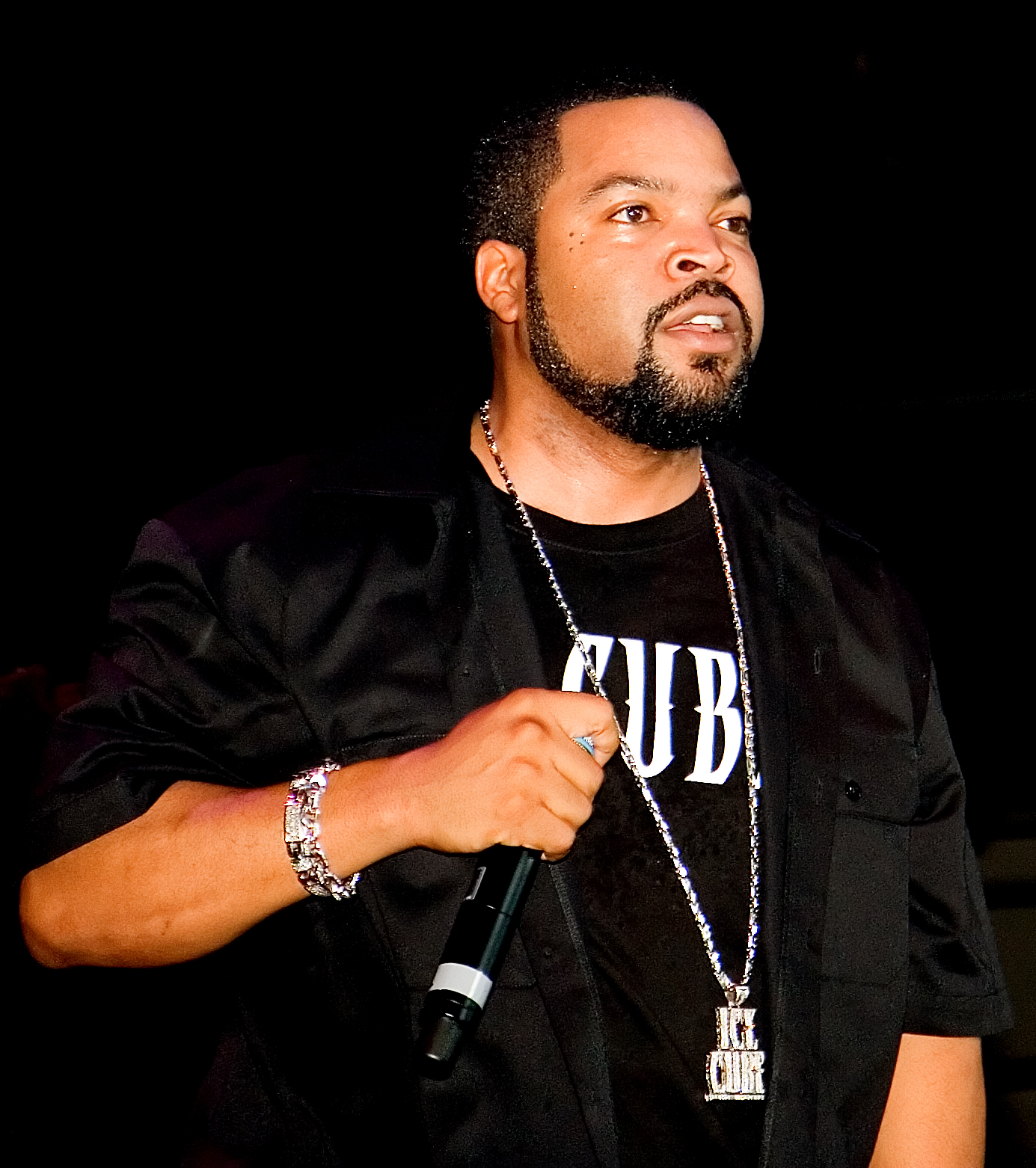
Ice Cube was the opener for the tenth Gathering of the Juggalos

The tenth Gathering of the Juggalos August 6–9, 2009, had the largest attendance in Gathering history with over 20,000 people. Over 120 musical artists performed at the event, including Ice Cube, Gwar, Coolio, and Scarface. During their set, Insane Clown Posse debuted the songs "Juggalo Island" and "Bang! Pow! Boom!" from their then-upcoming album Bang! Pow! Boom! Juggalo Championship Wrestling hosted Bloodymania III, Oddball Wrestling, and Flashlight Wrestling. Stand-up comedians included Jimmie Walker and Pauly Shore. The trailer for Big Money Rustlas also premiered during the event, where it was screened twice.

In honor of the Western comedy film Big Money Rustlas being released at the following event, the eleventh Gathering of the Juggalos, August 12–15, 2010, featured a "Best in the West" West Coast hip hop theme. Guest performances include Naughty by Nature, Spice 1, Method Man & Redman, Above the Law, and Warren G. A "Ladies' Night", hosted by Sugar Slam, featured performances by Kisa, Lil V, Ill E. Gal, and Tila Tequila. Shaggy 2 Dope hosted "Shaggy's Old School Super Jam", featuring DJing by 2 Dope and performances by Tone Lōc and Rob Base. Comedy was provided by Tom Green, Gallagher, and Ron Jeremy. That night, performers Method Man and Tila Tequila suffered facial lacerations as a result of objects that were hurled at them from the crowd. Both performers remained on stage, but, Tila Tequila suffered the worst reaction from the crowd with reports that indicated attendees in the crowd hurled various objects (including feces), in her direction. Method Man suffered a cut on his face, but aggressively continued the set and eventually won over the crowd.Five wrestling shows were booked for the event; Bloodymania IV, two Flashlight Wrestling events, an event featuring the cast of Half Pint Brawlers, and Oddball Wrestling.

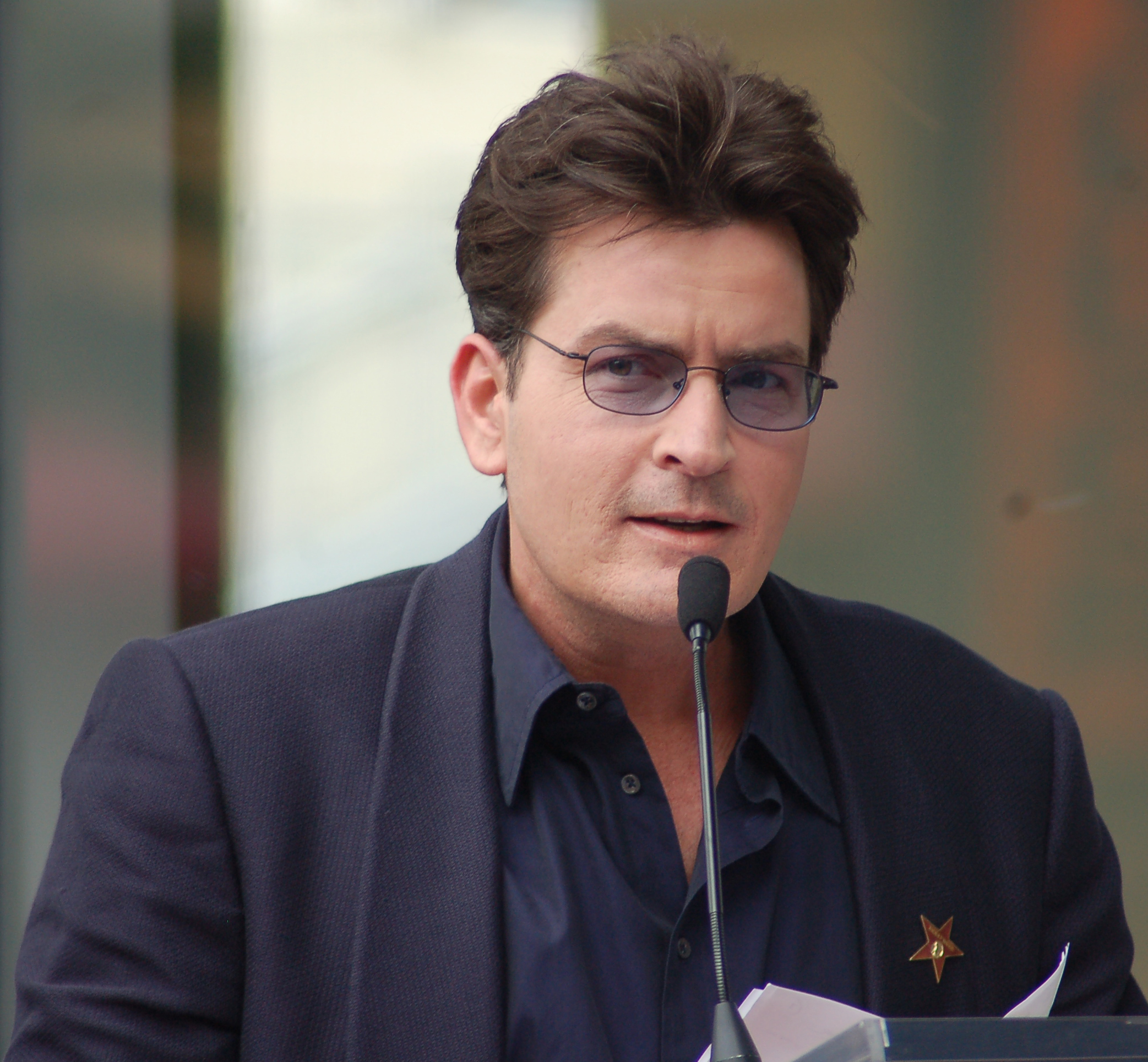
Charlie Sheen hosted Saturday night's main stage at the 2011 event

The twelfth annual Gathering of the Juggalos August 11–14, 2011, debuted the use of a celebrity host for each night's main stage with Dustin Diamond, Jumpsteady, Charlie Sheen, and Flavor Flav. Guest acts included artists Busta Rhymes, Mystikal, Juvenile, Lil Jon, George Clinton and Parliament-Funkadelic, Saliva, Ice Cube, Xzibit, and Paris. All of the main stage performances, as well as the wrestling events Bloodymania 5 and Legends & Icons, were broadcast live on internet pay-per-view. It was also announced that Vanilla Ice had signed with Psychopathic Records.

The thirteenth annual gathering took place from August 8–12, 2012, at Cave-In-Rock and featured Insane Clown Posse, Twiztid, Psychopathic Rydas, Dark Lotus, Blaze Ya Dead Homie, ABK, comedian Ralphie May, DJ Clay, Mike E. Clark, and Cold 187 AKA Big Hutch. Some other guest artists and groups included Tech N9ne, The Pharcyde, Soulfly, Fear Factory, Cheech & Chong, Danny Brown, Slaine, ¡Mayday! & the Geto Boys. A volume of photographs by Daniel Cronin from the event has been published, showing predominantly the people attending the event, not the performers.

The fourteenth annual gathering took place from August 7–11, 2013, at Cave-In-Rock. This was the final time the event was held in Cave-In-Rock.

=== Thornville, Ohio, Oklahoma City, Springville, Crystal Forest, and Macks Creek, Missouri (2014–present) ===
In February 2014, it was announced that the Gathering would be moving from its home at Cave-in-Rock to a family Campground in Kaiser, Missouri. However, several local citizens vigorously protested the Gathering being held in this location and the event had to be moved once more. It was reported by Insane Clown Posse themselves that locals had started a petition to keep the Gathering out of their area and flooded the owners of the campground with angry phone calls. Finally, a self-professed Juggalo referred to as Steve (who had previously been to the Gathering himself) contacted Psychopathic Records and offered the 120-acre Legend Valley as a place to host the event. Legend Valley (located in Thornville, Ohio) was officially chosen as the Gathering's venue for 2014. In a statement by Psychopathic Records in the February 28, 2014 edition of the Hatchet Herald, it was said that "Mere hours after the news begin spreading that Kaiser, Missouri would not welcome the Juggalo Family, we began receiving phone calls and emails from interested land owners and promoters who wanted to help ensure that the Gathering of the Juggalos found a home. One of the calls we got was from a down-ass ninja named Steve who owns the Legend Valley. [...] Steve has actually been to the Gathering of the Juggalos before and is not buying into the media's portrayal of what the Gathering is because he has been there. He has expressed to us that he is super down to host the Gathering this year and has always found Juggalos to be cool ass people. He also believes in our fight alongside the ACLU to have Juggalos removed from the FBI gang list, which is still on the list as a "loosely organized hybrid gang" because their sorry ass case was thrown out of court in 2014. In other words, he has our backs and is the perfect ninja we needed to ensure an awesome, trouble-free Gathering this year."

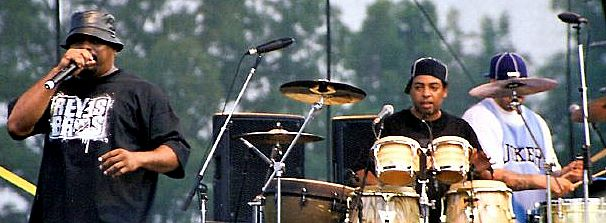
Cypress Hill performed at the festival in 2014

Legend Valley in Thornville, Ohio hosted the fifteenth annual Gathering of the Juggalos, which took place between July 23, 2014, and July 26, 2014. Advertised as "Shangri-La on Earth", this Gathering has over 70 artists scheduled to perform, including the entire Psychopathic Records roster and several notable guests such as Twiztid, Blaze Ya Dead Homie, Cypress Hill, Cannibal Corpse, Kottonmouth Kings, Tech N9ne, Da Mafia 6ix, and other artists. Also scheduled to perform are several comedians, including (most notably) Gilbert Gottfried. Three special parties are planned for the gathering: Kuma's Psychopathic All-Star Party, DJ Clay's Horney Nuts and Big Butts Party, and the Frothy Murder Mix Foam Party. Alongside all these events will be dance competitions, several contests, and Juggalo Championship Wrestling events (including JCW's Road to Bloodymania and Bloodymania 8), plus carnival rides, the annual ICP seminar, auctions, and more. In addition, it was announced via the Insane Clown Posse's Twitter account that there was to be a new Dark Lotus album slated for the 2014 Gathering.

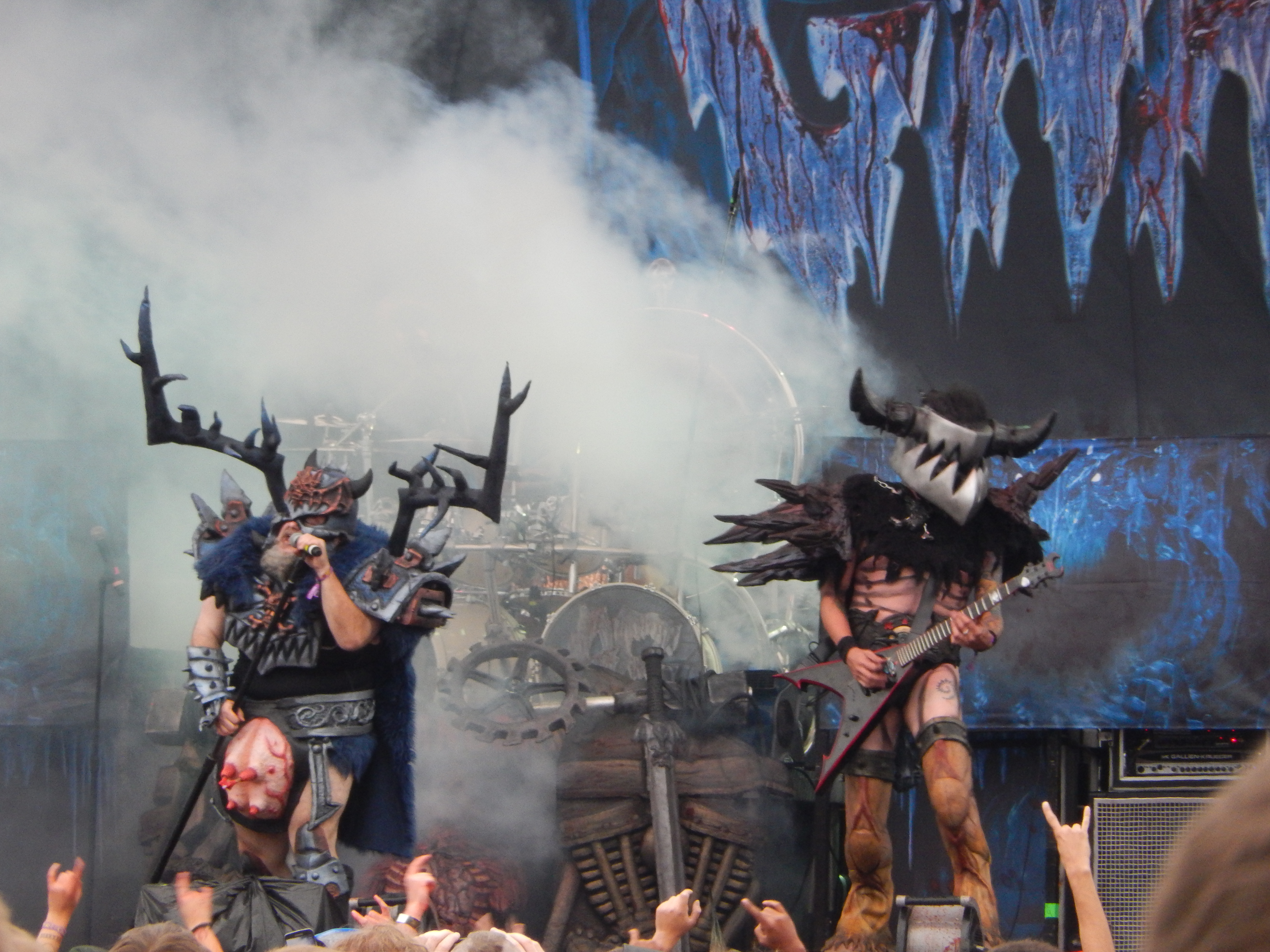
Gwar performed at the festival in 2016

It was announced at the Insane Clown Posse seminar at Legend Valley that the Gathering of the Juggalos would be held in Colorado in 2017. On April 11, Faygoluvers.net announced that GOTJ18 would be held in Oklahoma City, Oklahoma at the Lost Lakes Amphitheater on July 26–29, 2017. GOTJ19 was scheduled to return to Legend Valley on July 18–21, 2018.

On January 31, 2019, during the Juggalo show, it was announced that the 20th annual GOTJ would take place in Springville, Indiana at Lawrence County Recreational Park from July 31 – August 3, 2019.

On January 6, 2020, ICP announced on social media that the 21st annual Gathering of the Juggalos would return to Garrettsville, Ohio at Nelson Ledges Quarry Park "Crystal Forest" for the first time in 15 years. The festival was scheduled to take place August 5–8, 2020. On April 22, 2020, however, the concert was canceled for the year due to the COVID-19 pandemic.

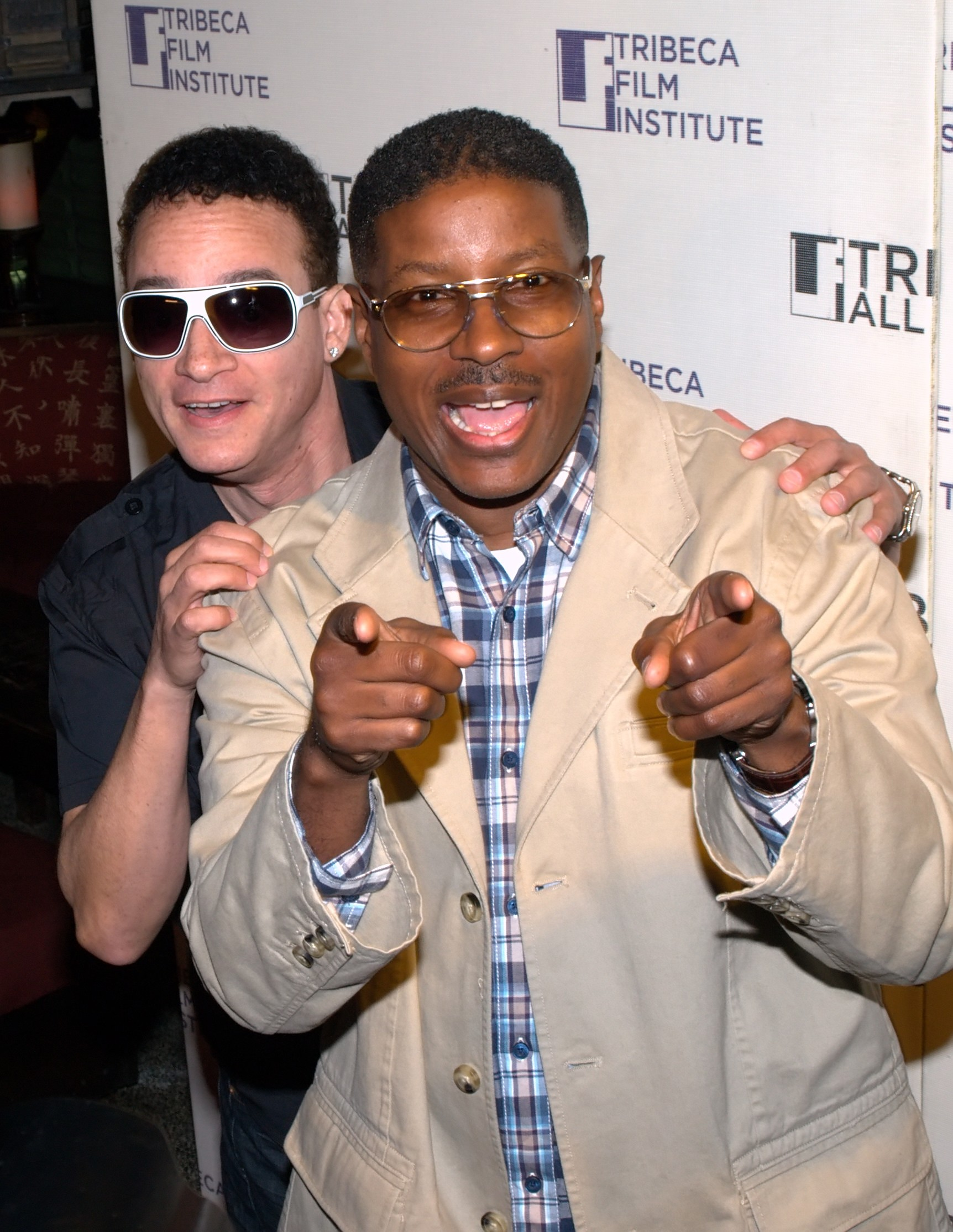
Kid 'n Play performed at the festival in 2021

The Gathering of the Juggalos returned in 2021 to Legend Valley, Ohio on August 19–August 21.

Legend Valley hosted the festival again in 2022, which took place on August 3–August 6.

== Performers ==
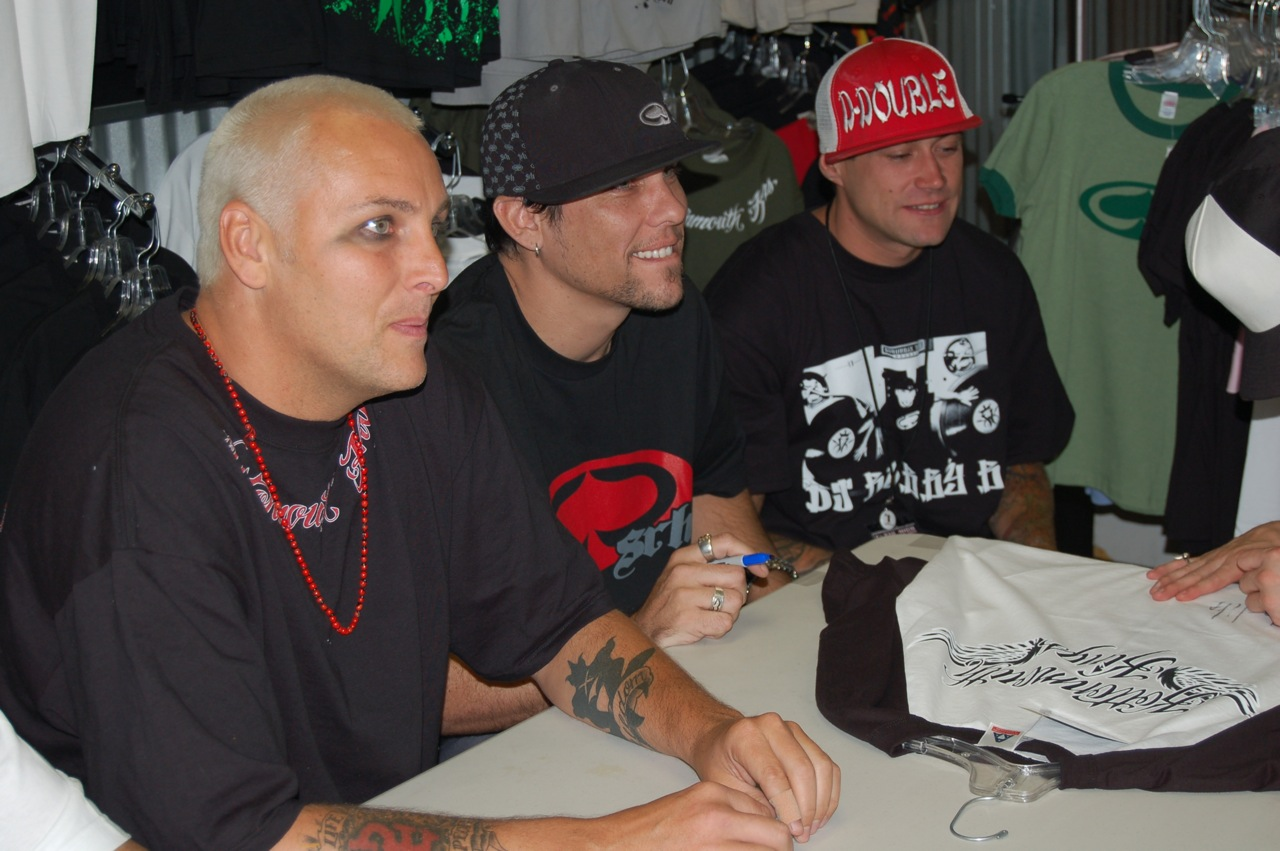
Kottonmouth Kings performed at the first festival and numerous others since

Over the years, several hundred artists have performed at the Gathering of the Juggalos. Outside of the label's roster, regular performers include Project Born, Kottonmouth Kings, Bone Thugs-n-Harmony, Vanilla Ice, Zug Izland, Esham, Natas, Side Weighs, Tech N9ne, Wolfpac, 2 Live Crew, Rehab, Necro, Haystak, King Gordy, Brotha Lynch Hung, Prozak, Three 6 Mafia, Afroman, Bizarre, Big B, George Clinton and Parliament-Funkadelic, Mack 10, Delusional, and Coolio.

Notable guest performances have included Bubba Sparxxx, Lil Wyte, Psychostick, Killah Priest, Bushwick Bill, Ol' Dirty Bastard, Kurupt, Powerman 5000, Digital Underground, Drowning Pool, Too $hort, Ying Yang Twins, Mushroomhead, Andrew W.K., Ice Cube, Gwar, Scarface, Naughty by Nature, Spice 1, Ralphie May, Method Man & Redman, Above the Law, Warren G, Cypress Hill, Cannibal Corpse, DJ Quik, Whitney Peyton, Tila Tequila, Tone Lōc, Rob Base, Busta Rhymes, Hopsin, Mystikal, Juvenile, Lil Jon, Saliva, Xzibit, Paris, Soulfly, Fear Factory, Static-X, P.O.D., One-Eyed Doll, Kittie, Green Jellÿ, MC Lars, Cheech & Chong, The Pharcyde, The Fat Boys, Millionaires, Kool Keith, Onyx, Danny Brown, Slaine, Master P, Raekwon, Swollen Members, Clownvis Presley, Jelly Roll, Morris Day & The Time, $uicideboy$, City Morgue, Ghostemane and Geto Boys.

== Activities ==
In addition to musical concerts, the Gathering of the Juggalos features multiple activities. Throughout the site there are carnival rides, Midway Games, and helicopter rides. Other events include Juggalo Karaoke, an Open mic, comedy, ladies oil wrestling, a wet T-shirt contest, a Ms. Juggalette competition, and Hog Daddy's Hellfire. Autograph signings and seminars are held by Juggalo Championship Wrestling, Mike E. Clark, Axe Murder Boyz, Blaze Ya Dead Homie, Anybody Killa, Boondox, Twiztid, and Insane Clown Posse.

Several late night parties also occur, including Ladies Night hosted by Sugar Slam, Mike E. Clark's Murder Mix Party, DJ Clay's Bubble Houseparty, Shaggy's Old School Super Jam, and Violent J's Michael Jackson Moonwalk BBQ Blowout Pajama Jam. Professional wrestling has been a prevalent feature of the event since its inception. Juggalo Championship Wrestling currently hosts JCW Try-Outs, Oddball Wrestling, Flashlight Wrestling, and Bloodymania at every Gathering event.

== Popular media ==
Psychopathic Records’ infomercial for the 2009 Gathering of the Juggalos was parodied on the television sketch comedy Saturday Night Live. The sketch was titled "Kickspit Underground Rock Festival" and featured the fictional rappers Killa Thrilla Klownz, and aired on the December 5 edition of the show. Joseph Bruce stated that he was not offended by the parody, and that he thought that the sketch was "hilarious" and "a humongous compliment". The "Kickspit Underground Rock Festival" has since become a recurring series of sketches.

At the 2010 event, Tila Tequila was performing when she was struck by objects thrown from the audience, which resulted in coverage by numerous media outlets. Tila claimed that she would sue Juggalo Gathering LLC, but never did.

In 2011, the hit television show Workaholics aired an episode called "Straight Up Juggahos". The episode revolved around an Insane Clown Posse concert, which acted as a direct parody of the Gathering of the Juggalos. In June 2011, comedy troupe Upright Citizens Brigade received a cease and desist from Insane Clown Posse for titling one of their performances "The Gathering Of The Juggalos For A Mother Fucking Baby Funeral."

In 2013, the FilmDrunk Frotcast launched a successful Kickstarter campaign to create a documentary studying the Gathering from an outsider's perspective. The group consisted of photographer Ben Kaplan, comedian Matt Lieb, and film critics Vince Mancini and Laremy Legel. The film, titled Whoop Dreams, premiered in 2014 to decent reviews, and Mancini and Legel have written articles and essays about their experiences.

In 2018 the mobile game ICP: The Gathering was released for iOS and Google Play. The game lets players create their own Gathering of the Juggalos festival.

In 2023, Vice Media posted a YouTube video focusing on the Gathering in which a Vice reporter attends and takes part in the events.

== Events ==
Year	Dates	Venue	Location	Performers	Notes	Ref
2000	July 21–22	Novi Expo Center	Novi, Michigan	Insane Clown Posse, Twiztid, Blaze Ya Dead Homie, Psychopathic Rydas, Project Born, Kottonmouth Kings, Juggalo Championshit Wrestling		
2001	July 13–15	SeaGate Convention Centre	Toledo, Ohio	Suicide Machines, Marz, Myzery, Psychopathic Rydas, Project Born, Three 6 Mafia, Bone Thugs-n-Harmony, Blaze Ya Dead Homie, Twiztid, Dark Lotus, Vanilla Ice, Insane Clown Posse, Juggalo Championshit Wrestling		
2002	July 19–21	Peoria Civic Center	Peoria, Illinois	Primer 55, Ghoultown, Blaze Ya Dead Homie, Kittie, Dark Lotus, Anybody Killa, Zug Izland, Esham, Twiztid, Psychopathic Rydas, Mack 10, Bubba Sparxxx, Insane Clown Posse. Juggalo Championshit Wrestling		
2003	July 19–21	Nelson Ledges Quarry Park	Garrettsville, Ohio	Jumpsteady ft. Delusional, Dope, Esham, Dark Lotus, Blaze Ya Dead Homie, Zug Izland, Vanilla Ice, Twiztid, Killah Priest, Kottonmouth Kings, Anybody Killa, Bushwick Bill, Wolfpac, Insane Clown Posse, Juggalo Championshit Wrestling		
2004	July 15–18	Nelson Ledges Quarry Park	Garrettsville, Ohio	Insane Clown Posse, Twiztid, Dark Lotus, Blaze Ya Dead Homie, Anybody Killa, Esham, Jumpsteady ft. Delusional, Zug Izland, Ol' Dirty Bastard, Vanilla Ice, Kurupt, Tech N9ne, DJ Swamp, Wolfpac, Bone Thugs N Harmony, Juggalo Championshit Wrestling		
2005	July 21–24	Nelson Ledges Quarry Park	Garrettsville, Ohio	Insane Clown Posse, Twiztid, Anybody Killa, Esham, Blaze Ya Dead Homie, Jumpsteady ft. Delusional, Dark Lotus, Tech N9ne, Mack 10, 2 Live Crew, Powerman 5000, Manntis, Mini Kiss, Juggalo Championshit Wrestling, Total Nonstop Action Wrestling		
2006	July 13–16	Frontier Ranch	Pataskala, Ohio	Axe Murder Boyz, Delusional, Blaze Ya Dead Homie, Digital Underground, Drowning Pool, F.I.L.T.H.E.E. Immigrants, Insane Clown Posse, Jumpsteady ft. Delusional and Allik, Rehab, Project Deadman, Too $hort, Twiztid, Wolfpac, Age Of Reason, Vile, Dead by Wednesday, Mower, Bobaflex, Killa Kat, Intricate Unit, Dark Lotus, Rebels Without Applause, Juggalo Championshit Wrestling	Originally supposed to take place at the Michigan International Speedway in Brooklyn, Michigan	
2007	August 9–12	Hogrock Campgrounds	Cave-In-Rock, Illinois	Insane Clown Posse, Twiztid, Blaze Ya Dead Homie, Boondox, Anybody Killa, Dark Lotus, Psychopathic Rydas, Ying Yang Twins, Necro, Haystak, Edifide, King Gordy, Mastamindz, Menace 2 Sobriety, Mushroomhead, Prozak, Psycho-Jesus, Zug Izland, Bone Thugs-n-Harmony, Tali Demon, Juggalo Championship Wrestling, Mars, Project Born, Autopzy, Bare Knuckle Conflict, Bat on Fire (feat. Dramadeus), Bloodshot, Claas, Daville Dabris, Defekt, Dieabolik, Dr. Gigglez, God Forbid, Group Rehab, Ill E. Gal, Insane Poetry, Jason Porter, F. Dux, Killa-C, LaVey, the Lords Demons, McNastee, Point 2 Point, Russett Burbank, Ruthless, Shy One, Sutter Kain, Isolated Beingz, Underworld Assassins		
2008	August 7–10	Hogrock Campgrounds	Cave-In-Rock, Illinois	Insane Clown Posse, Twiztid, Blaze Ya Dead Homie, Boondox, Anybody Killa, Dark Lotus, Psychopathic Rydas, Three Six Mafia, Ice-T, Andrew W.K., 2 Live Crew, Afroman, Esham, King Gordy, Zug Izland, Primer 55, Awesome Dre, Durty White Boyz ft. Delusional, V Sinizter, Drainage X, Underworld Assassins, ABiCA, Amanda, A-Town Mob, Bizarre, Cellar Mannequin, Chop Shop, Claas, Darkhalf, Edifide, F2H, Foreverman, Freakz R Us, George Zelaya, H8trid, Head Hurtz, Monstarz, ill e. gal, Illuminati, J Reno, J. Sin, O Menace, Kryptik, Lo Key, Loco, Cost Ninjas, M Welkin, Madd Maxxx, Mars, Mastamindz, Menace 2 Sobriety, Muder Mic, Playaz Lounge Crew, Powerglove + Lilith Astaroth, Q Strange, R.I.A., Rachel Paul, Reverend Fang Gory, Russett Burbank, Ruthless, S.H.I., Scum, Section 8, Shane Capone, Shy One, Smokehouse Junkiez, Str8 Jacket, Straight, Slime, Subnoxious, T.O.N.E.-Z, The No Clue Crew, The Real Chaos, The Reflooko Jumbee Experience, Thirty 3 Threes, Wolfpac, Xplicit, Juggalo Championship Wrestling		
2009	August 6–9	Hogrock Campgrounds	Cave-In-Rock, Illinois	Insane Clown Posse, Twiztid, Blaze Ya Dead Homie, Boondox, Anybody Killa, Dark Lotus, Paradime, Bizarre, MC Chris, Ice Cube, Prozak, Dayton Family, Tech N9ne, Haystak, Coolio, Axe Murder Boyz, Kottonmouth Kings, Mushroomhead, Vanilla Ice, Scarface, Delusional & Durty White Boyz, T.O.N.E-z, Total Chaos, 614 Villainz, The Rude Boy, Bad Dream 17, Cid Voorheez, Nuttin Nyce, Rev Fang Gory, IlleGal, Shy One, Trip C, Project Born, Mars, Playaz Lounge Crew, Drive-By, Mizt3r Purple, Freddy Grimes, Stranger Haze, The Real Chaos, Smokey Rameriz, Ignited, Ikkurruz, Scum, Cellar Mannequin, Somkehouse Junkiez, Lo Key, Psycho Jesus, V-Sinister, Chop Shop, King Gordy, Wolfpac, 7th Layer, H8tred, Hagerstown Skeez, Head Hurtz Monstars, Unstable, Swollen Members, The Dirtball, Big B, Claas, AJAX, Awesome Dre, J Reno, Psychopathic Rydas, CRSMN, Illuninati, Loco, Jim Kanklez, Os7, Bankrupt Records, Trackula, Juggalo Championship Wrestling		
2010	August 12–15	Hogrock Campgrounds	Cave-In-Rock, Illinois	Insane Clown Posse, Twiztid, Blaze Ya Dead Homie, Boondox, Anybody Killa, Dark Lotus, Psychopathic Rydas, Claas, V-Sinister, Menace 2 Sobriety, Awesome Dre, Above The Law, Naughty by Nature, The Dayton Family, Warren G, Kottonmouth Kings, Axe Murder Boyz, Brotha Lynch Hung, Tech N9ne, Spice 1, Rehab, Method Man & Redman, Gangs of Green, 17ent, Rhythmic 3, Defekt, Pain, 7th Layer, Smokehouse Junkiez, King Gordy, AJAX, Big B, Afroman, Troubled Mindz, D Murder, Nyland & Dex, Nuttin Nyce, Mizt3r Pruple, Freddy Grimes, Ikkurruz, Trip C, Miss Kisa, LiL V, Ill E. Gal, Tila Tequila, Dmize, 614 Villainz, Trackula, Os7, Head Hurtz Monstars, Scum, Whitney Peyton, J Reno, Mars, Mastamind, Prozak, Coolio, OushaBoo, Project Assassins, Pimp on Wheels, Loco, Unstable, Rev Fang Gory, Virus, Liquid Assassin, Tone Lōc, Rob Base, Juggalo Championship Wrestling, Russett Burbank, Critical Bill, Kung Fu Vampire, Blue Felix, Sid Wilson, Vanilla Ice, Psychostick, Villebillies, Wolfpac, Lil Wyte, Hed PE		
2011	August 11–14	Hogrock Campgrounds	Cave-In-Rock, Illinois	Insane Clown Posse, Twiztid, Blaze Ya Dead Homie, Anybody Killa, Boondox, The Dayton Family, Dark Lotus, CKY, DJ Quik, Kottonmouth Kings, Juvenile, Mystikal, Kittie, George Clinton & Parliament-Funkadelic, MC Hammer, Tech N9ne, E-40, Paris, Dope, Saliva, Vanilla Ice, Xzibit, Ice Cube, Busta Rhymes, Lil Jon, Paul Wall (did not show/mix up with booking), Hed PE, Mastamind, Potluck, Charlie Sheen, Boo Clan, Psychopathic Rydas, Axe Murder Boyz, Wolfpac, Mars, Kung Fu Vampire, Open Mind Productions, Menace 2 Sobriety, Ajax, Downtown Brown, Mic Lordz & Sauce Funky, Critical Bill, Project Born, Lil Wyte, Liquid Assassin, Psycho Jesus, Smokehouse Junkiez, CLAAS, V-Sinizter, Prozak, King Gordy, Ikkurruz, SCUM, OUSHABOO, Unstable, F. Dux, AJ Jordan, the Crescendo So Sick Social Club, Molly Gruesome, Doe Dubbla, Deadly Poisons, Hopsin, Prescription RX, JFE BOYZ, 17 ENT, DMIZE, Bobby Brown Juggalo Championship Wrestling		
2012	August 8–12	Hogrock Campgrounds	Cave-In-Rock, Illinois	Insane Clown Posse, Twiztid, Blaze Ya Dead Homie, Anybody Killa, Cold 187um, Dark Lotus, Psychopathic Rydas, Geto Boys, Tech N9ne, George Clinton & Parliament-Funkadelic, Mushroomhead, Rehab, Soulfly, Danny Brown, Slaine, Motown Rage, Zug Izland, Myzery, P.O.D., Swollen Members, Hed PE, Kottonmouth Kings, Static-X, Mack 10, Get It Together, Fear Factory, Kool Keith, Onyx, Millionaires (group), Master P, Prozak, ¡Mayday!, Jumpsteady, Rude Boy, Ric Flair, The Pharcyde, Lil Eazy-E, Warren G, Glasses Malone, Raekwon, The Fat Boys, Rahzel, Biz Markie, Rittz, Lil Wyte, Haystak Jelly Roll, Project Pat, Lil Jon, Upchuck The Clown, Cheech & Chong, Ralphie May, Bobcat Goldthwait, Jamie Kennedy, MK, Awesome Dre, Bizarre, King Gordy, Wolfpac, Doe Dubbla, The Dayton Family, AJAX, Mars, ClAas, F. Dux, Smokehouse Junkiez, Twisted Insane, Mastamind, Liquid Assassin, Axe Murder Boyz, Bukshot, Kesto, So Sick Social Club, Critical Bill, Downtown Brown, Sleep Tastes Pretty, Menace II Sobriety, Insane Poetry, Scum, Madness Has Boy, Dagda, Chief, Odd Fellaz, Gritty, Kayla K, Nukie the Carpathio, J Dirty, AJ Jordan, Blind Insanity, So High Clique, Stranger Haze, Fury, Mass Murderaz, Daniel Dahmer, Azylum Inmates, Sedated, Dark Half, Wicked Wayz, Dirty Adville, Bobby Sick, 10/31, Troll, Luni Spade, DeJangles, Os7, Dopesic, Chop Shop, Str8Jaket, Jimi Kanklez, Flagrant, Ikkurruz, Sixx Digit, Unstable, The MF'n Dirty, O Villianz, Freddy Grimes, Molly Gruesome, Ryan Ho, Sketch, Bobby Sick, Political Assassin, D. Evil/Uncle Phoenix, Juggalo Championship Wrestling		
2013	August 7–11	Hogrock Campgrounds	Cave-In-Rock, Illinois	Insane Clown Posse, Twiztid, Blaze Ya Dead Homie, Anybody Killa, Psychopathic Rydas, Boondox, Zug Izland, Vanilla Ice, Kottonmouth Kings, Dizzy Wright, Lil Wyte, Rahzel, Master P, ¡Mayday!, Sevendust, Tech N9ne, Brotha Lynch Hung, Soulfly, Rehab, Rittz, Swollen Members, Dark Lotus, Drive-By, Legz Diamond, King Krimzon, Smackola, Wolfpac, Onyx, Whitney Peyton, T.O.N.E.-z, Big B, Ill E. Gal, Mars, Myzery, Aqualeo, Lil Eazy-E, Poe Whosaine, Blowfly, Kung Fu Vampire, Slaine, Potluck, Axe Murder Boyz, Blind Insanity, Cash Amigo, Osirus, Beast Mode, Hazmat E.T.G., Kegan Ault, Ill Wit It, Wildcard, Insane Eric, 7 Second Suicide, Freddy Grimes, Haystak, Alphamatic, Dirty Advile, Insane Poetry, Prescription, Will D.O.B., Draztik, Super Smash Bros, Bukshot, JellyRoll, Krizz Kaliko, Wazteland Warriorz, T.O.S., Krak Rok, Murdaface, Sixx Digit, Razorz Edge, Mastamind, ClaAs, Buckwheat Gators, The Underground Avengers, Seth Brock, Fury, Tre LB, Demented, Pixy, Sketch, Southside Hatchet Swingin'Mob, Origix & DC, Project Born, Psycho Realm, Kletuz Karnage Cassidy, Randum, Hostile 6, Cykoskifrantik, Izzy Dunafore, Pimp On Wheels, 17 Ent., Sedated, The Deadly Medly, Kaiju Big Battel, Juggalo Championship Wrestling		
2014	July 23–26	Legend Valley	Thornville, Ohio	Insane Clown Posse, Twiztid, Blaze Ya Dead Homie, Anybody Killa, Boondox, Axe Murder Boyz, Dark Lotus, Big Hoodoo, Wolfpac, Ces Cru, Biohazzard, Tech N9ne, Whitney Peyton, Cannibal Corpse, Yelawolf, Caskey, Da Mafia 6ix, Kottonmouth Kings, Dizzy Wright, Madchild, Cypress Hill, Hopsin, Stevie Stone, Zug Izland, Lil Wyte, (hed) p.e., Twisted Insane, JellyRoll, La Coka Nostra, Psychopathic Rydas, Razakel & Sicktanic, Bone Crusher, The Underground Avengers, Wayne Static, Jarren Benton, Motown Rage, Johnny Richter, Shock G, Insane Eric, Razorz Edge, Smokehouse Junkiez, AJAX, Insane Poetry, Scum, Mr. Grey, Mr. Liqz, P Win, Dark Half, DurtE, Young Lyte, Crucifix, Wildcard, Spaide Ripper, Cryptic Wisdom, no emotion goldmask, Hiway, Kaiju Big Battel, Juggalo Championship Wrestling	Originally supposed to take place in Kaiser, Missouri	
2015	July 22–25	Legend Valley	Thornville, Ohio	Insane Clown Posse, Twiztid, Blaze Ya Dead Homie, Anybody Killa, Axe Murder Boyz, Boondox, Dark Lotus, Big Hoodoo, Kottonmouth Kings, Hopsin, Tech N9ne, Aqualeo, Puddle of Mudd, Flosstradamus, Jarren Benton, Potluck, Dope D.O.D., In This Moment, Rittz, Mushroomhead, Waka Flocka Flame, Machine Gun Kelly, Terror Universal, 50 Shades Of Snuff, Neurotic November, Ho99o9, Zug Izland, Stitches, Da Mafia 6ix, Myzery, King 810, Twista, Psychopathic Rydas, Ill Nino, Nova Rockafeller, Wolfpac, Madchild, Ill P., My Brothers Keeper, U.F.C., Thugstar, T-Ryde, TripC, T.M.R., S. King, Illest U. Freeze, Molly Gruesome, Liquid Assassin, Trizz, S. Muskey, (DIM), G-Mo Skee, Playboy Tha Beast, J.P.K., Halfrican, Travis S., Bulletproof, A.Z., Windy City, D. Menace, Sketchy C., F. Dox, Amerikan Overdose, Swag Toof, Lo Key, J. Ledger, City Limits, Moonmen, Stenjoddi, Snake iiz, Wil & Rabbid, Str8jaket, Danny Kae, Deadly Medly, Juggalo Championship Wrestling		
2016	July 20–23	Legend Valley	Thornville, Ohio	Insane Clown Posse, Twiztid, Blaze Ya Dead Homie, Anybody Killa, Boondox, Ces Cru, Suicide Silence, Rittz, Tech N9ne, Bukshot, Kissing Candice, Kottonmouth Kings, Gwar, One-Eyed Doll, Lil Wyte, Attila, Asking Alexandria, (hed) p.e., Emmure, JellyRoll, Hopsin, Bone Thugs-N-Harmony, UPS, Scare Don't Fear, Black Flag Music, Kung Fu Vampire, The Dayton Family, Axe Murder Boyz, Big Hoodoo, Esham, Whitney Peyton, !Mayday¡, Young Wicked, Dark Lotus, Lex "The Hex" Master, Wolfpac, Slick Rick, The Killjoy Club, B. Scan, Molly Gruesome, Project Born, Green Jellÿ, Famz and the Hooliganz, Ninja G, Dead Eye, Enasnimi, 614 Villainz, JPK, J Dub, SSB & Southside Hatchet Swingin Mob, #Behemoth, Alla Xul Elu, Sedated, UFO, Gypsy, Frodo The G, G-Mike, Ill Phil, Lowercase J, Sewerside, Skitzo, Ill, Ascent To, Lo Key, The R.O.C., Stoner Jordan, Juggalo Championship Wrestling		
2017	July 26–29	Lost Lakes Amphitheater	Oklahoma City, Oklahoma	Insane Clown Posse, Anybody Killa, DJ Clay, Big Hoodoo, Lyte, Vanilla Ice, Psychostick, Madchild, Mushroomhead, Kissing Candice, Kung Fu Vampire, Cage, Dope, Lyrical Snuff Productions, Upon A Burning Body, ¡Mayday!, Waka Flocka Flame, Zug Izland, JellyRoll, P.O.D., Prof, Shaggy 2 Dope, Skitzo, Murder Musick, Bukshot, Native World Inc., V-Sinizter, Flaw, September Mourning, Green Jellÿ, Wolfpac, American Grim, Lil Debbie, Miss May I, R.A. the Rugged Man, The Browning, Froggy Fresh, Myzery, Insane Poetry, Brotha Lynch Hung, Sup3rsayin, Headshot Louie, Ronnie Blaze, JPK, Body Bag Syndikate, Chop Shop, Wiked Wood, P.R.E.A.C.H., SSB, Alla Xul Elu, Sewerside, #Baconnomics, T-Ryde, Wil E. Haze, Str8jaket, Beast Motion, A.Z. The Fallen, Van Brando, Skull Kidz, Zitro, King Irish, Mr?E, 5th Power, Kaos Anubis, MC Viruz, Optymus Music, Chiiirp, Statik G, McNastee, Louis Cheese, Roach Joka, Youngster Jji, Bake Lo, Madopelli Music, State Of Krisis, Bulletproof The Fool, LSP Snuff Blender, Juggalo Championship Wrestling		
2018	July 18–21	Legend Valley	Thornville, Ohio	Anybody Killa, Big Hoodoo, Insane Clown Posse (performing a regular set, and The Wraith: Hell's Pit in its entirety), DJ Clay, Lyte, Ouija Macc, Yelawolf, Gwar, CKY, Grateful Dead (tribute band), Janis Joplin (tribute band), Jimi Hendrix (tribute band), Santana (tribute band), R.A. the Rugged Man, Esham, Attila, Immortal Technique, Hopsin, JellyRoll, Tech N9ne, Butcher Babies, King Iso, Lyrikal Snuff Productions (Scum, Liquid Assassin, Smallz One, Damien Quinn), Myzery and Zug Izland, The Killjoy Club, Kingspade, Mac Lethal, Seed of 6ix, Menace 2 Sobriety, Pound The Pavement House Party, Motown Rage, The Dirtball, Native World Inc. (Anybody Killa, Freddy Grimes, Flagrant, Ed Smash, Mad V, Mr. Y.U.G.), Dirty Machine, Alla Xul Elu, LSP's MMMFD (Scum & Insane Poetry), Kissing Candice, Mike Busey, MC Lars, Anarchy Bronze, Big Buzz, Cemetery High, Chiiirp, EL-SD, Frodo The Ghost, Goest Ryder, Humble Lunatic, Joey Cough, Konspiracy Kamp, Lowercase J, Miss Cyanide, Novatore, Poet, Purple Hearts, Razorz Edge, Ronnie Blaze, Stoner Jordan, T.H.C. (The Heart of Cleveland) and Tommy Traina, 10/31, Beyond Top Secret, Dizasterpiece, Glitter Moneyyy, Griinch Muzic (Bake Lo, Histio and Zitro), Ill E. Gal, JPK, Manganelli, Mi$ta 420, Open Minded, P.R.E.A.C.H., Ya Ya The Gremlin, Juggalo Championship Wrestling		
2019	July 31 – August 3	Lawrence County Recreational Park	Springville, Indiana	Insane Clown Posse, Jumpsteady, Bone Thugs-n-Harmony, Butcher Babies, Ghostemane, Geto Boys, Gilbert Gottfried, Gwar, Jedi Mind Tricks, KRS-One, Mac Sabbath, Morris Day and the Time, Randy's Cheeseburger Picnic, Rittz, Suicideboys, Soopa Villainz Tech N9ne, Token, Morris Day, Slyer, Gorilla Pimp, Dropout Kings, Anybody Killa, Astronautalis, BIG HOOHOO, Blahzay Roze, Brokencyde, C+C Music Factory, C-Mob, Clownvis Presley, City Morgue, Cybertronic Spree, DJ Clay, Dropout Kings, Eazy Mac, Esham, GFM, Hav Knots, ICP's Drums & Strums, Kingspade, Kung Fu Vampire, Like A Villain, Lyte, Madchild, Mike Busey, Moneyside Musica, Motown Rage, Mushroomhead, Myzery, Odd Squad Family, Ouija Macc, Preach, Rehab, The Rude Boy, Sabu Sandman, September Mourning, Shakewell, Shane Douglas, Sylar, The Convalescence, Tommy Dreamer, Twisted Insane, Whitney Peyton, Willie Mack, Wolfpac, Zug Izland, Vinnie Paz, Deviant Horror, Juggalo Championship Wrestling		
2021	August 19–21	Legend Valley	Thornville, Ohio	Insane Clown Posse, BIG HOODOO, Chris Hansen, Danny Brown, DJ Paul, Freewill, ICP's Bizzar Bizaar Show, Kid 'n Play, King 810, Lardi B, NASCAR Aloe, 9 Dead, Ouija Macc, R.A. the Rugged Man, Raven Black, Rude Boy & DJ Carlito, Steve-O, Vanilla Ice, Whitney Peyton, Zitro, Clownvis, DJ Chunk, Devereaux, Dropout Kings, Blahzay Roze, The Dayton Family, DJ Clay, Myzery, Project Born, Shaggy The Airhead, V Sinizter, Hexxx, Cody Manson, Derrty Shirt, Double Homicide, Ezekiel, Gnarcotix, Hex Rated, Isolated Beingz, Jakk Faust, J Biz R, J Payne, Klokwerk E, Knowledge Da MC, La Purp, Open Minded, Problemattik, Rouges Gallery, S.O.N., Sewerside, Side Weighs, Skitzo, SSB, Tierre Diaz, Wiked Wood, and Whiskey n Water, Juggalo Championship Wrestling		
2022	August 3–6	Legend Valley	Thornville, Ohio	Insane Clown Posse, Ouija Macc, Fat Nick, KRS-One, Odd Squad Family, HEXXX, The X-Ecutioners, Large Professor, The Future Kingz, Mike E. Clark, Freewill, In Dying Arms, LSP's Gorehounds of Snuff, Mereness, Super Famous Funtime Guys, The Hatchet Man Project, Babytron, Egyptian Lover, In Dying Arms, Pouya, Roadside Ghost, Sir Mix-A-Lot, Slick Rick, Steel Panther, The Cybertronic Spree, Tre LB, #BPTF, Fat C, Wiked Wood, Big Hoodoo, Esham, HO99O9, Scythe Gang 666, Mushroomhead, American Overdose, Dana Dentata, Green Jelly, Group Home, HB The Grizzly, Legz Diamond, Lorentz, Madd Maxxx, Reverend Television, Motown Rage, Onyx, Skitzo, Wicked Wayz, 386 Music, Clooner, Famz and the Hooliganz, Ghoulaveli, Grimm, Hitman Chris, Ill Fortune, Like A Villain, McNastee, Politicize, Professor Fresh, Really Bad People, Riddy K, Sex Waffles, The Psykoloz, Tricky Youth, Wild Bill, Yahz (Ka-Hopi), Zigzvck, MC Lars, Juggalo Championship Wrestling		
2023	July 5–8	Legend Valley	Thornville, Ohio	Insane Clown Posse, Ouija Macc, KRS-One, HEXXX, Alien Ant Farm, Arrested Development, City Morgue, Krizz Kaliko, Dropout Kings, Natas, Hatchet Man Project, Kung Fu Vampire, Mac Sabbath, Riff Raff, Rittz, Sponge, Sugarhill Gang, Whitney Peyton, YelaWolf, Zackass, 9 Dead, Al Mal, Freeze Martian, Juggalo Cypher Live, Klokwerk E, Korihor, Normundy The 6ix, D-Loc, Freewill, Lardi B, Madchild, nekrogoblikon, R.A. the Rugged Man with DJ Lala, Raven Black, Shakewell, Abstrakt, Babble The Demon, Barz!, Belushi Speedball, Benny Buttons, Big Fluff, Darby O' Trill, Facetatmami, Freeze MF, GunnerB, Heathensun, Humble Among, JVNEBVG, Kace Cayne, Kingsmen, Matt Foy, NGS, Redefind, Rob Zilla, Seenloc, Shilow, Summoner's Circle, The Coursing, The God Bombs, Tierre Diaz, Trey Magic With Splice (Doctors of Doom), TSO Ghostly, Wil E. & Faygo Gang, Zitro, ZOMBI3CULT, Juggalo Championship Wrestling		
2024	August 14–17	Legend Valley	Thornville, Ohio	Bazooka Sharkz, Bible Belt Massacre, Cartoon Bondurantm, Corvin’s Breed, Dying Oath, GANXSTA N-I-P, Isolated Beingz, Jordon Stepp, King Wicked, Kreature, LaGoth, Looney’s Tunez, Merkules, Mikey Rotten, Monster Wolf, Ouija Macc, Our Inner Circle, PercyBones, Posezur, Rook Mewsick, S.O.N., Saint Diablo, Scream At The Sky, SHOWMEGOD, Skitz Kraven, Smallz One, Static-X, The Hooliganz, The Lap, The Unforgiven, Trauma 2$ick, TWISTED INSANE, UMMO, V-Sinizter, Vended, Wakko The Kidd, xEIGHTY-SIXEDx, Super Famous Funtime Guys Juggalo Championship Wrestling		
2025	August 13–16	Legend Valley	Thornville, Ohio	Insane Clown Posse, Waka Flocka Flame, Ouija Macc, ¡Mayday!, Gwar, Immortal Technique, Belushi Speedball, Fight From Within, Motown Rage, NORMUNDY, Odd Squad Family, Lardi B, RA The Rugged Man, Stacc Styles, Tech N9ne, 216Zay, Abe Link’d N, Acetone Boogie, Antzy & Damone, Big Brutal, Black Majik the Infidel, Bloodshot Mafia, Bluntfield, #BPTF, Brotherhood X, Celtixx, Double Homicide, Dread, Evol Stephen, Falling Under, Freeky Da Pimp, Fury, Gavyn Gunn, Get Moneyyy, GG Esko, GinjaBred, Hellz Bellz, Jason Mask da Booth, JDirty, Keagan Grimm, Knowledge Da MC, KOAT Records, Lie in Wait, McNastee, Nada, Nino Light & J Payne, Problemattik, Razurtung, Sam Astaroth, Shade Heka, Skeezus, Sorry 4 Yellin, Swanger, T3mpo Tai, Tha Dumpster Babies, Tht Boi Jonesy, Tony Bone, Trikkdout, Underworld Assassins, Will E Haze & Faygo Gang, Zombi3cult, Green Jelly, Mary Tyler Whores, The Convalescence, Actus Reus, AL MAL aka AdotWAKE, Bodies Below Sea Level, Bondbreaker, Donnie Menace, FOTY OZ, Gloom, Hatchet Mountain Rising, K7 Army, Madd Maxxx, Mantra of Morta, Moppy, Redburn, Resistor, Saving Vice, Set for the Fall, Sewerside, Siamese Goat God, Sinizter, Skitzo, Smile on the Sinner, Squid Pisser, Vlad’s Skeletal Circus, Wiked Wood, Wild Bill and Worldwide Panic, Big Jay Oakerson, Luís J. Gomez, Tim Butterly, Zac Amico, Juggalo Championship Wrestling, Game Changer Wrestling	Also referred to as the Gathering of Legends	
2026	August 19–22	Mother Nature's Riverfront Retreat	Macks Creek, Missouri	Jordon Stepp, Midnightinyami, Salamander X, Nathan James, Darby O'Trill, Esham, Mutanoid Underground Dwellers, Shotgun Willy, Alla Xul Elu, Butcher Babies, Chris Webby, Tech N9ne, Nivek, Mic Ange70, Mayb Someday, NGS, Buried Within, ZXL, Him, The Tenerous Trio, Acid Kult's Goat God Summoning, Crossbreed, Bible Belt Massacre, Gloom Unit, Scream at the Sky, TSO Ghostly, Durtnap, Equally Opposite, Cumshot Wound, Zitro, Long Live Evil, Hatchetman Project, Rysk Framitden, Atrocity Girl, Matt Foy, Sinshrift, Venom Stay Drippin, Zero Signal, Seuss Mace, LSP Presents: Devil's Trident, Muttlee, Auntie Boy, Klokwerk E, xEightySixedx, Ouija Macc, Juggalo Championship Wrestling, Kung Fu Vampire, MC Lars, DJ Paul, Milli Vanilli, Vanilla Ice, Hatebreed, Esham, Insane Clown Posse		
