= Kaiju Big Battel =

Studio Kaiju performance

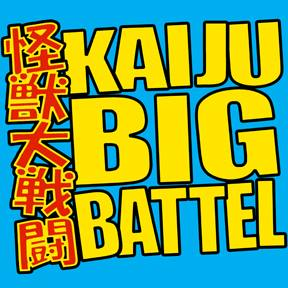
- Founded: 1994
- Style: Professional wrestling parody of tokusatsu kaiju eiga films
- Headquarters: New York City, New York, United States
- Founder: Rand Borden
- Website: Official website

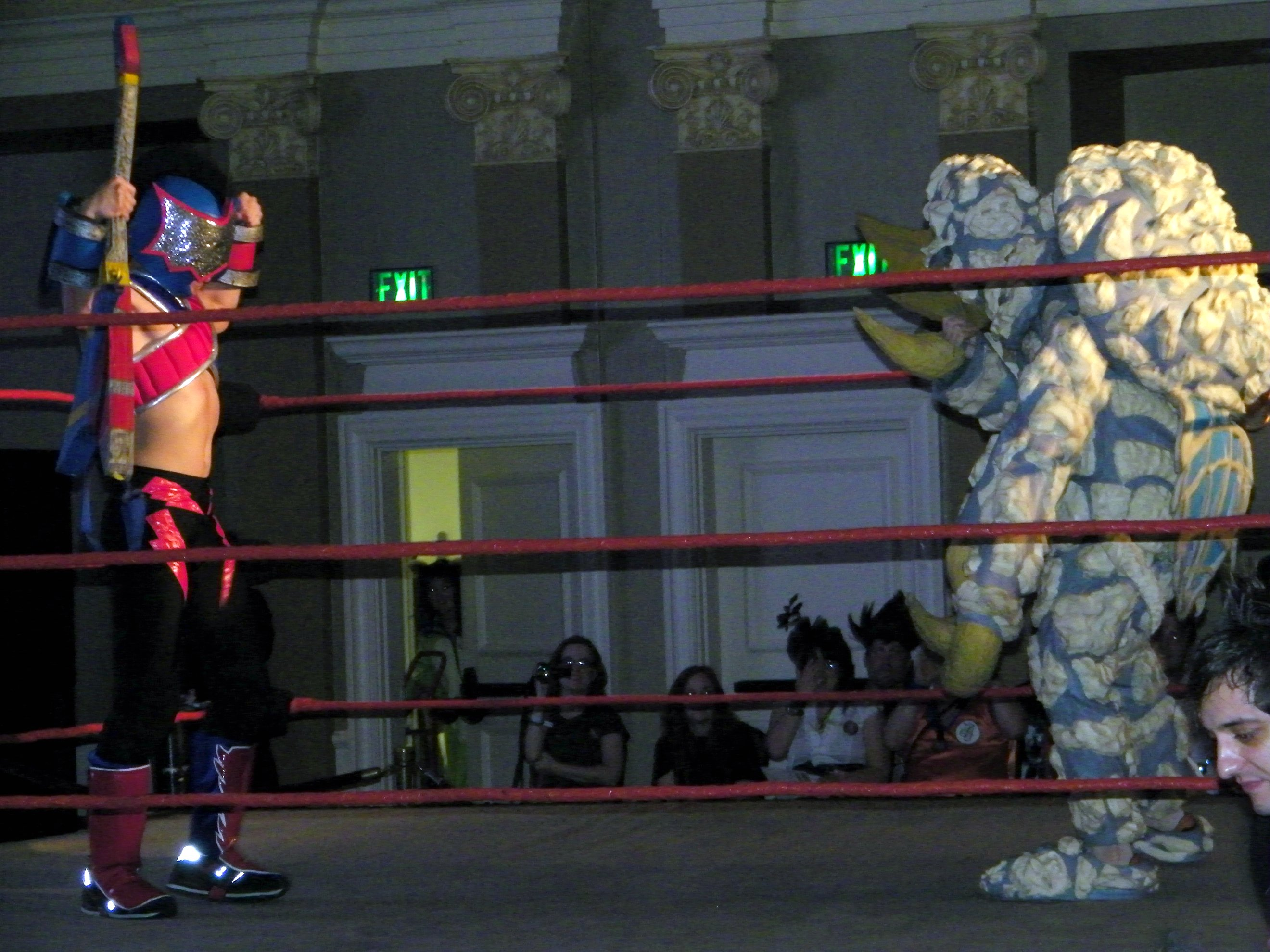
Metal Wing Black vs Yarsminko, in 2009

Kaiju Big Battel is a performance by the New York City based performance entertainment troupe and professional wrestling promotion created by Rand Borden. The performances are parodies of both professional wrestling and the tokusatsu kaiju eiga films of Japan. These Battels are presented in the style of professional wrestling events, with the costumed performers playing the roles of giant, city-crushing monsters similar to Godzilla and Gamera. The odd spelling of battel originates in a mistake Borden made on a T-shirt design, which became an inside joke. The performances include many in-jokes aimed towards fans of professional wrestling (especially Mexican wrestling), superhero comic books and Japanese popular culture. Many of the names of the characters are in mock Spanish or mock Japanese, and Engrish is used liberally for comedic effect.

== History of Studio Kaiju ==
While a student at School of the Museum of Fine Arts, Boston, Rand Borden and peers who grew up watching Ultraman decided to make kaiju suits for a short film. The first character created was Midori no Kaiju (Japanese for "Big Green Monster"), which Borden assembled from upholstery foam coated with latex. After about a year, he finished this first kaiju suit. The other students did not make anything, but Borden enjoyed making the costume decided to make more.

On Halloween night in 1994, the first live competition, or Big Battel, occurred at the Revolving Museum in Boston. The Battel featured Midori No Kaiju, as well as Atomic Cannon, Powa Ranjuru, Force Trooper Robo, Taro "The Mouth" Fuji's commentary, and Anthony Salbino's construction. The first full-scale Kaiju Big Battel event was held in March 1995 in Boston, Massachusetts at the School of the Museum of Fine Arts. The earliest performances in other cities included matches with other troupes of costumed wrestlers at venues such as Fort Thunder in Providence, Rhode Island. Borden has created more than 120 monster costumes, which he keeps in storage.

In 2000, Borden formed Studio Kaiju and hired his brother, David, as manager. Kaiju Big Battel: Terebi Sento was the studio's first DVD release, showcasing four matches from 2001 and several bonus features. Kaiju Big Battel: A Practical Guide to Giant City-Crushing Monsters, a comedic history of the first 8 years of Kaiju Big Battel, was published in 2004 by Hyperion Press.

Studio Kaiju was dissolved in 2011 and Rand Borden returned to producing Kaiju on his own.

Kaiju Big Battel performed at TwitchCon 2017 at the Long Beach Convention Center in Long Beach, California at an event that was simultaneously broadcast on Twitch. On May 4, 2019 Kaiju Big Battel held their first European event at Alexandra Palace in London, England. On October 10, 2024, Kaiju Big Battel held their first Asian event at Shin-Kiba 1st Ring in Tokyo, Japan.

== Notable characters ==
=== Kaiju Heroes ===
- American Beetle is an American-born hero "so proud of his Mexican heritage that he only speaks Spanish".
- Burger Bear is a half-burger, half-bear kaiju prone to violent outbursts.
- Dusto Bunny is a monstrous anthropomorphic dust bunny. His height is "one billion dust mites", and he weighs "64 tons (mostly fluff)".
- French Toast is a giant waffle with a French accent. His nickname is "The Awful Waffle".
- Los Plantanos (Paco and Pedro Plantain) are a pair of freedom-fighting plantains trying to overthrow the sock-puppet dictator of their home country.
- Powa Ranjuru is an angelic kaiju who descends from the heavens to aid her fellow heroes when they are in trouble.
- Silver Potato is a foil-clad tuber man with a love for breakdancing.
- Unicorn Party is a human-turned-kaiju, raised by the King of the Unicorns, who wears a pink, horned helmet to fight evil.

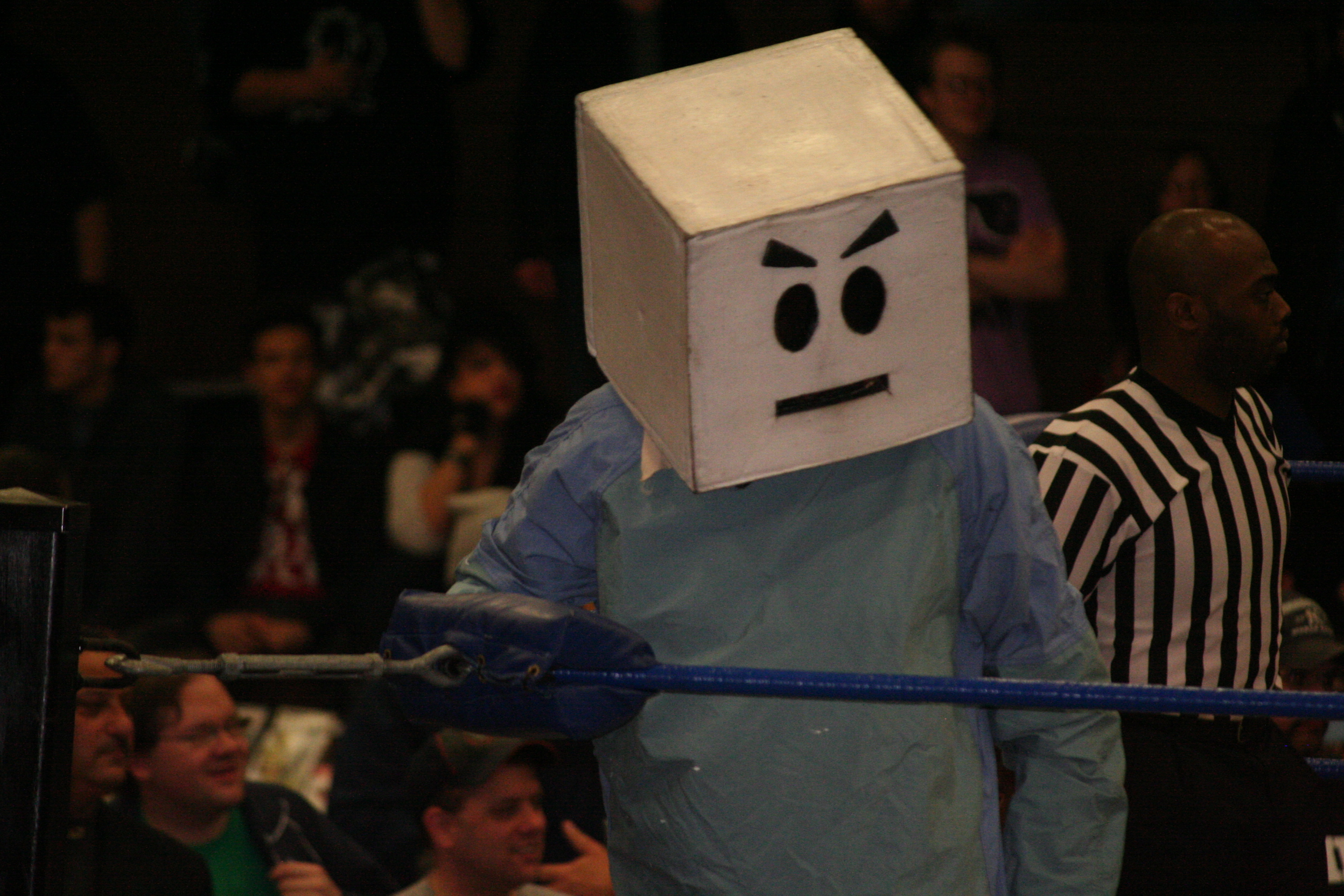
Dr Cube

=== Dr. Cube's Posse ===
- Dr. Cube is the main villain of Kaiju Big Battel. He is a disfigured plastic surgeon who wears a white box over his face to hide his scars. He uses genetic modification and mind-control to command an army of kaiju to destroy mankind and control the earth. His character was created after Kaiju Big Battel owner Rand Borden found a surgical gown and a box.
- Bear Ranger is a former Kaiju Hero and the former trainer/manager of Burger Bear, who was killed by Dr. Cube's Posse, only to be resurected as one of his evil minions.
- Derano is a grotesque duck kaiju. Recently, Dr. Cube used a goodness-extracting gun to remove any remaining kindness from the monster, resulting in Derano being split into two: one "good" and one "evil."
- Gomi-man is a giant trash monster from New Jersey. He ofter throws garbage onto innocent bystanders.
- Hell Monkey is a monkey... from hell. He was Dr. Cube's right-hand monster until recently, when he left the posse in order to form his own group: The Satanic Six.

=== Rogues ===
- D.W. Cycloptopuss III is an aquatic kaiju who fights as part of the Sea World Order.
- Double Unicorn Dark is Unicorn Party's evil brother. Jealous of his popularity, "Dudley" followed Unicorn Party back to the world of the humans to exact his revenge.
- Kung-Fu Chicken Noodle is a martial artist wielding a cleaver and wearing a can of soup over his torso. He weighs "120 fluid tons".
- Midori 2000 is from the same species as the Kaiju Big Battel's original monster, Midori-no-Kaiju. It was the “Dragon” summoned from the mysterious Pearl Of Power during Kaiju Big Battel's 30th anniversary celebration.
- Sky Deviler II is the daughter of the original Sky Deviler, and had been prophesied to become the most powerful kaiju monster of all time.
- Steam-Powered Tentacle Boulder is a kaiju who doesn't have time for any jibber-jabber from you, rainbow munch! Once a Kaiju Hero, Boulder was recently infected by a parasitic brain-worm, which caused him to go rogue.

=== Humans ===
- Andy Salbino is the owner of the Salbino Construction Company, and helps rebuild the city after every fighto.
- Referee "You Call That a Knife" Dundee keeps order in the big ring. He has recently retired.
- Referee Ulysses J. Washington is the newest Kaiju Big Battel referee, replacing Referee Dundee.
- Vinny D’Lux and Clybo are the current announcers for Kaiju Big Battel.

== Kickstarter projects ==
Studio Kaiju has run two Kickstarter campaigns. The first, 20 Years of Kaiju Big Battel Posters, was launched in June 2016 and was to be a hardcover art book featuring posters from Kaiju shows. The campaign failed to meet its stated goal of $20,000. A second Kickstarter for Kaiju Big Battel figurines was launched in August 2018 and successfully raised $21,396.

== Kaiju Big Battel: Fighto Fantasy ==
On October 31, 2018 a Kaiju Big Battel video game was released on PC and mobile platforms. The game was developed by Super Walrus Games and is a satire of Final Fantasy style RPGs from the '90s.

== Political themes ==
Story lines for events are inspired by the American political atmosphere at the time. During the time when Obamacare was being legislated, the character of American Beetle switched from a Republican to a Democrat because he needed insurance for surgery. Quotes from American president Donald Trump were sometimes used in promos made by the main villain, Dr. Cube.
