= Psychopathic Rydas =

American hip hop group

- Origin: Detroit, Michigan
- Genres: Gangsta rap
- Years active: 1999–2015
- Labels: Joe & Joey
- Past members: Bullet; Full Clip; Lil' Shank; Foe Foe; Cell Block; Twin Gatz; Sawed Off; Converse; Yung Dirt

Psychopathic Rydas was an American hip hop supergroup based in Detroit, Michigan. Formed in 1999 as a side project of Insane Clown Posse and Twiztid, the group consisted of Psychopathic Records-associated rappers performing under alternate stage names in the style of gangsta rap. Violent J, Shaggy 2 Dope, Jamie Madrox, Monoxide Child, and Blaze Ya Dead Homie were the only consistent members of the group throughout their entire existence.

== History ==
Psychopathic Rydas was created as a retaliation to the critics saying Psychopathic Records artists were "wannabe rappers". The supergroup was also utilized as a showcase for the label's roster which was expanding for the first time since its inception. The group first consisted of Violent J (Bullet) and Shaggy 2 Dope (Full Clip) of Insane Clown Posse, who had released five albums prior; Jamie Madrox (Lil' Shank) and Monoxide (Foe Foe) of Twiztid, who had released two versions of their debut album prior; Myzery (Twin Gatz) who had released a debut EP prior; and Blaze Ya Dead Homie (Cell Block) who was in the process of releasing his debut EP.

In the liner notes of Insane Clown Posse's album The Amazing Jeckel Brothers fans could find out how to send proof of purchase to Psychopathic Records to get a full-length album titled Dumpin', by a "gangsta rap spoof" group called Psychopathic Rydas. The album was released on the imprint Joe & Joey Records. From that point on, Rydas albums could not be officially released elsewhere due to the use of unlicensed samples and beats.

Over the next two years, there were plans for the original six members to release solo albums as their respective persona. The Pendulum #7 (which were mini releases related to Insane Clown Posse's comic book series) featured two solo songs by Bullet and one solo song by Full Clip. A solo song by Lil' Shank was leaked online, and later included on a limited edition boxset by Twiztid in 2019. A second song by Lil' Shank was eventually released in 2020 on Twiztid's mixtape For the Fam, Vol. 3. In 2023, a solo track by Cell Block was included on his compilation Graveyard Greats, Volume 2, which also featured verses by Lil' Shank. Solo songs by Foe Foe and Twin Gatz from the same era never surfaced.

After the release of Dumpin', Twin Gatz left the group and Psychopathic Records in general. The remaining five members released the album Ryden Dirtay at the 2001 Gathering of the Juggalos, just days before the other collaboration album Tales from the Lotus Pod by Dark Lotus came out. Ryden Dirtay is the only Rydas album to appear on the Billboard Independent Albums chart, at #46. Wanting to involve more artists, Rydas added two new members in 2004, being Anybody Killa (Sawed Off) and Esham (Converse). As a sampler, the Limited Edition EP was released. Three out of the four songs would be exclusive to this release. At the 2004 Gathering of the Juggalos, Check Your Shit in Bitch! was released.

Converse and Sawed Off left Psychopathic Records in 2005 and 2006 respectively. Cell Block, Bullet, Full Clip, Lil' Shank, and Foe Foe were the remaining members of the group yet again, similar to 2001; however, in 2007, they added Boondox (Yung Dirt) to the group. This lineup released the album Duk Da Fuk Down that same year.

It would be four years until another Rydas collaboration happened. In 2011, Sawed Off returned to the group. The seven members released the albums Backdoor Ryda EP and EatShitNDie. This would mark the final releases as a group. In late 2012, Lil' Shank, Foe Foe, and Cell Block would leave Psychopathic Records to eventually form their own label, Majik Ninja Entertainment. Yung Dirt would leave Psychopathic Records in the following years as well. Starting in 2012, the four rappers would still appear at the annual Gathering of the Juggalos, and perform as Psychopathic Rydas as well; however, 2015 would feature the final Rydas performance. 2016 marked the artists' final appearance at the annual event, although the Rydas did not perform at that year's Gathering of the Juggalos.

Bullet and Full Clip stated in various interviews that a revival of the Rydas was a possibility, but nothing concrete was ever officially announced; thus, the supergroup became inactive. In 2019, Lil' Shank, Foe Foe, Cell Block, and Yung Dirt created a spin-off group named The Rydas on their own label, adding in other artists as well. They released their self-titled album under Majik Ninja Entertainment on January 9, 2020. In addition, Twin Gatz and Sawed Off have also released solo albums under their Psychopathic Rydas pseudonyms; however, the releases were not affiliated with Psychopathic Records or Joe & Joey Records.

== Music and style ==
Psychopathic Rydas reuses the beats of popular rappers within the genre without paying to license the original songs or requesting permission from copyright owners to use the music, effectively making their albums bootlegs and resulting in the releases becoming difficult to find in some markets. Psychopathic Rydas' debut album, Dumpin', was originally given away for correctly answering a series of trivia questions printed in the liner notes of Insane Clown Posse's album, The Amazing Jeckel Brothers.

== Discography ==
- Dumpin' (1999)
- The Pendulum #7 EP (2001)
- Ryden Dirtay (2001)
- Limited Edition EP (2004)
- Check Your Shit in Bitch! (2004)
- Duk Da Fuk Down (2007)
- Backdoor Ryda EP (2011)
- EatShitNDie (2011)

== Members ==
- Violent J as Bullet (1999–2015)
- Shaggy 2 Dope as Full Clip (1999–2015)
- Jamie Madrox as Lil' Shank (1999–2015)
- Monoxide Child as Foe Foe (1999–2015)
- Blaze Ya Dead Homie as Cell Block (1999–2015)
- Myzery as Twin Gatz (1999–2000)
- Anybody Killa as Sawed Off (2002–2006; 2008–2015)
- Esham as Converse (2002–2005)
- Boondox as Yung Dirt (2007–2012; 2013–2015)
