= Whitney Peyton =

American rapper

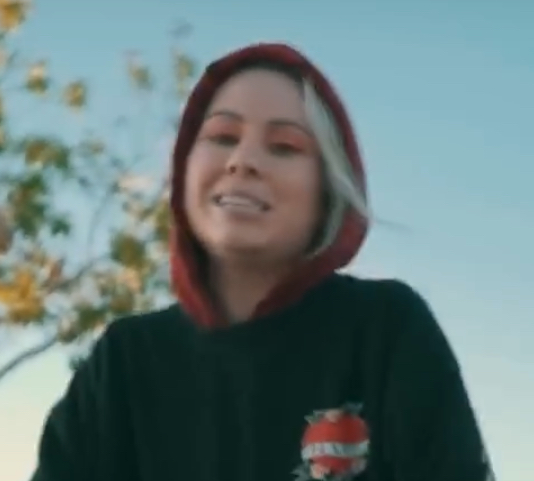
- Peyton in 2023

Background information
- Also known as: Dub-P; Pey Pey
- Born: Philadelphia, Pennsylvania, U.S.
- Genre: Hip hop
- Occupations: Rapper; singer-songwriter
- Years active: 2008–present
- Labels: Alpha Howse (2021–present); Suburban Noize (2019–2021); Tragic Hero (2017–2019)

Whitney Peyton is an American rapper from Philadelphia, Pennsylvania.

== Early life and influences ==
Growing up in the suburbs of Philadelphia, Peyton looked up to artists who had emerged from the area such as Will Smith, Eve, and P!nk. Peyton started writing poetry and became influenced to pursue a music career after seeing music videos starring Missy Elliott, Eminem, and No Doubt. In 2017, she became the first solo hip hop artist to sign with Tragic Hero Records.

== Music career ==
=== 2014–2018: Touring ===
After many one-off dates nationally throughout the beginning of her career, Peyton participated in a full 40-date US tour with rap legend R.A. the Rugged Man and Potluck entitled the "Rugged and Raw Tour" from October–December 2013. In 2014, it was announced that Peyton would be on the "Triple 6 Sinners Tour" with the remaining members of platinum rap group Three 6 Mafia (now known as "Da Mafia 6ix"). The tour ran from the beginning of March to the end of April 2014 with over 50 show dates across the nation. In 2014, Peyton received a Tri State Indie Music Award for "Emerging Indie Artist of the Year". With a growing fan base, Peyton was able to then embark on her first co-headlining tour with fellow artist Cryptic Wisdom called the "illien Underdog" Tour which included several US dates and ran throughout May 2014. Doing several large headlining spot dates during summer and fall 2014, in winter 2014 Peyton toured with controversial electronica group Blood on the Dance Floor on "The Reckoning" Tour which was 20 US dates. In 2015, Peyton headlined many show dates and opened for Fronzilla of Attila along with Palisades on the 20+ date Party Tour. In 2016, Peyton alternated performing as a headliner and supporting act on over 250 shows. The full tours she was on include Kottonmouth Kings, YouTuber Social Repose, Kutt Calhoun (formerly of Strange Music), One-Eyed Doll, JellyRoll, and Jonny Craig. Peyton also did a few select spot dates with Tech N9ne, Rittz, Jarren Benton, and more. In 2017, Peyton toured with radio rock band Flaw and appeared on spot dates with Born of Osiris, Volumes, and The Dead Rabbitts. In winter/spring of 2018, Peyton began her first full national headlining tour. In August 2017, Peyton announced that she got signed to Tragic Hero Records. In summer/fall of 2018, Peyton toured with fellow female artist Lil Debbie.

=== 2019–present: Keyed Up and Alpha ===
On January 25, 2019, Peyton formed Keyed Up with her friend Gina Fritz. On November 1, 2019, it was announced that Peyton had signed to Suburban Noize Records and that her fourth studio album Alpha would be released through the label on January 24, 2020. Keyed Up released their debut album Left on Read… on October 16, 2020. Later on May 28, 2021, it was announced that Peyton had left Suburban Noize to form her own label Alpha Howse distributed by ONErpm.

== Other ventures ==
=== TV and film ===
During her teenage years, Peyton appeared as an extra or bit parts in several films. One of the motion pictures was Cover, starring Vivica A. Fox and directed by Bill Duke, where she played a small role of a roughed-up female inmate in a jail scene. With a history of appealing to a college-aged demographic, yet producing side projects for several charities, Peyton has earned a reputation of possessing a versatile musical style. In 2010, Peyton, along with four other Philadelphia artists, was cast to be part of the "Unlitter Us" campaign appearing in TV commercials airing on major networks performing spoken-word pieces about the importance of keeping Philadelphia clean. Together the five artists also appeared in print and transportation ads on buses and billboards, and were seen alongside Philadelphia mayor Michael Nutter at anti-litter rallies, inner-city schools, and other community events. Peyton later appeared in many other works shot in Philadelphia and New York, most of which were never released, including a show that was set to be a Netflix Original Series entitled Voodoo Church.

=== Podcast ===
Peyton has co-hosted the podcast Caffiendz with her girlfriend Gabriella Meghan. Caffiendz is a "coffee-fueled podcast exploring all things weird" where Peyton and Meghan talk about everything from aliens to true crime cases.

The podcast is currently on hiatus as both are working on other projects.

== Discography ==
Studio albums

- On the Brink (2014)
- Break the Frame (2016)
- Firecracker (2017)
- Iridescent (2018)
- Alpha (2020)
- The Audacity (2022)
- Side Effects (2023)
- Short Fuze (2026)

EPs

- 09 Is Mine (2009)
- No Holds Barred (2011)
- Coffee Cups and Combat Boots (2012)
- Fear of Falling (2015)
- Refresh (2017)

Mixtapes

- Insufficient Fund$ (2009)
- The Remedy (2010)

Compilations

- Firecracker (Pyro Edition) (2017)

With Keyed Up

- Left on Read (2020)
