= Kissing Candice =

2017 film

- Film poster
- Directed by: Aoife McArdle
- Written by: Aoife McArdle
- Produced by: Sally Campbell; Andrew Freedman
- Starring: Ann Skelly
- Cinematography: Steve Annis
- Edited by: Dan Sherwen
- Music by: Jon Clarke
- Production companies: Venom Films; Screen Ireland
- Distributed by: Wildcard Distribution
- Release dates: 8 September 2017 (TIFF); 22 June 2018 (United Kingdom)
- Running time: 102 minutes
- Country: Ireland
- Language: English

Kissing Candice is a 2017 Irish drama film directed by Aoife McArdle and starring Ann Skelly. It was screened in the Discovery section at the 2017 Toronto International Film Festival and had its European premiere at the Berlin International Film Festival in February 2018.

== Cast ==
- Ann Skelly as Candice
- Ryan Lincoln as Jacob
- Conall Keating as Dermot
- Ryan McParland as Conor
- Caitriona Ennis as Martha
- John Lynch as Donal
- Jack Nolan as Wolfman
- Tony Doyle as Sharkey
- Maghnús Foy as Monk
- James Greene as Maguire
- Seaghán Óg O'Neill as Aaron
- Jason Cullen as Caleb
- Kwaku Fortune as Finn

== Reception ==
The film holds an approval rating of 73% on Rotten Tomatoes, based on 15 reviews, with an average rating of 6.3/10.

Peter Bradshaw of The Guardian said, "Aoife McArdle's tale of a teenager rescued in reality by a stranger from her fantasies is an audacious delight." Hot Press wrote, "At once raw and stylised, dreamlike and terrifyingly real, Kissing Candice is a bleak portrait of Ireland, but a compelling one." Sinead McCausland of Film School Rejects wrote, "For a film so assured, stylised and well paced, McArdle has certainly made an impressive, and memorable, debut."

=== Controversy ===
Even though it screened as part of the Generation 14plus section at the 2018 Berlinale, the film was given an 18 certificate by the Irish Film Classification Office. The film was given a 15 rating in the United Kingdom.
