= Sláine =

Sláine (sometimes anglicized as Slaine) is an Irish given name.

== People ==
Notable people with this name include:

- Slaine (rapper), hiphop MC from Boston
- Sláine ingen Briain (fl. 1014), daughter of Brian Boru and wife of Sigtrygg, king of Dublin
- Sláine mac Dela of the Fir Bolg, the first legendary High King of Ireland
- Slaine Kelly (born 1982), Irish actress

== Fictional characters ==
Fictional characters include:

- Sláine (comics), comic book hero inspired by Celtic mythology
  - Sláine: The Roleplaying Game of Celtic Heroes, role-playing game based on the setting

== See also ==
- List of Irish-language given names
