= Villebillies =

American hip-hop group

Background information
- Origin: Louisville, Kentucky, US
- Genres: Hip-hop
- Years active: 2006–present
- Labels: Sony; Island Earth; Universal Motown
- Members: Demi Demaree; Dustin "Tuck" Tucker; Derek "Child" Monyhan; Tim Bernauer; Adam Goff; Malcolm McLaughlin; Brian Cronin
- Past members: David "2B" Mouser; James "Dylan" O'Daniel; Ron Ping; Justin Reid; William "BJ" Young
- Website: villebillies.com

Villebillies [VILL-BILL-EEZ] is an American hip-hop group from Louisville, Kentucky. The Villebillies' signature sound incorporates elements of hip-hop, rock, country, blues, soul and bluegrass.

The group began in the early 2000s when a crew of loosely related musicians and MC's began to collaborate, and named themselves the Villebillies, an ironic nod to their hometown of Louisville, Kentucky. By playing shows and handing out demos, the Villebillies quickly became a local success. In 2006, the band was signed to Universal/Motown and released their self-titled debut. Two years later, the band left the label but continued to write and perform independently, releasing several albums under their own imprint.

== History ==
The band was formed in early 2001 through a collaboration between Demi Demaree, lead singer of the Louisville rock band Plan Of Man, and the hip hop production team of Dustin Tucker and William Young. The first demo recordings featured instrumental contributions from Demaree's Plan Of Man bandmates, Adam Goff, Ron Ping, Justin Reid, and Tim Bernauer.

By the time of their first live performance on February 16, 2002, the lineup had grown to include vocalists Derek Monyhan, Dylan O'Daniel, and David Mouser.

Villebillies performed as a five-man vocal act until late 2004 when the group officially merged with Demaree's other band, Plan Of Man. The group began showcasing for major labels and in August 2005 Universal Motown Records signed the ten man band.

The band hired producer Toby Wright to record their debut album. Disagreements between the band and producer caused delays and late in the process the band hired Bob Ezrin to produce the final track on the album.

Villebillies major label debut was released on September 26, 2006. The band toured in support of the record, headlining large clubs through the south and Midwest and opening for a variety of major acts ranging from hip hop artists like Nelly to country music singers like Hank Williams Jr.

In January 2007 after several months of on and off touring David Mouser decided to leave the group. His departure was sudden and unexpected but the band quickly recovered, performing shows with the remaining vocalists filling in on Mouser's parts.

In May they headed out on their first nationwide tour in support of Skratch 'N Sniff, a nationally syndicated radio program based in San Diego, California. The bill included four other acts, (həd) p.e., Authority Zero, Mower, and Danny Diablo, all affiliated with the indie label Suburban Noize. The tour visited over thirty cities across the U.S. and received heavy radio promotion.

At the end of the Scratch N Sniff tour the band experienced a series of setbacks that started with the record labels decision not to renew their contract and the subsequent departure of the band's management. The situation was further complicated when Dylan O'Daniel and William Young left the group to pursue other interests.

As rumors of a breakup began to circulate, the band responded by booking shows, posting a new song "Stranger" to the internet, and announcing their intention to release a new album sometime in 2008.

In a December 2007 interview vocalist Derek "Child" Monyhan stated "We're better than ever now, because we're smaller, tighter and smarter.". In the same article vocalist Demi Demaree hinted that the band was taking a more "rocked out" approach. A second new single "One Shot" was released to the internet in February 2008 as an example of the band's new direction. Seven months later the band released their second album, From the Belly of the Beast.

Within weeks of the release of "From the Belly of the Beast" the group produced a music video for the first single, "Stranger". Three more singles, "No Seeds", "One Shot", and "Flask and a Gun" were given the video treatment. All of the videos were co-directed by Shaun Wilson and band members, Demi Demaree and Dustin Tucker. The collaboration marked the launch of Melted Clock Studios, a film production company that, in addition to creating music videos for the Villebillies, produces works for other artists, as well as comedy skits, and promotional videos.

In early 2010 the group went through another change in lineup. The band contemplated a reunion of the complete original lineup. Dylan O'Daniel and David Mouser both expressed a desire to re-join the group. At the same time, however, Derek Monyhan was considering leaving the Villebillies to focus on his family and pursue his own creative direction. By spring of that year Monyhan had left and O'Daniel re-joined the band.

After the lineup change the Villebillies began writing music for a new album. The first new song "Talk To Me" was leaked to the internet as a live acoustic performance filmed back stage at the Hullabalou Music Festival. The studio version of the song and accompanying music video were released in late fall of 2010. Around the same time the Villebillies made available to the internet a collection of early unreleased material under the album title Early Times. After nearly a year-long absence, Monyhan rejoined the band in early 2011. The Villebillies released their fourth full-length studio album Appetite for Dysfunction in the spring of 2012.

In 2013, the Villebillies released a video for the song "Love Is Kind of Crazy" online. The video brought the band major label attention once again and they, via their indie label Island Earth Music, signed to Sony Music Entertainment with The Cherry Party/RED Associated Labels. The pop single "Love Is Kind Of Crazy" - a version of the Classics IV song Spooky - was released worldwide through RED Associated Labels in November 2013.

Villebillies released their 5th full-length studio album, Holy Water, on October 11, 2016, to much critical acclaim. In a Courier-Journal review, reporter Jeffrey Lee Puckett asserts that this could be the band's best work to date. In support of the release, the Villebillies made a special appearance on 91.9 WFPK's Live Lunch from the University of Louisville's Red Barn on October 14, 2016.

On July 28, 2017, Alice Cooper released his 20th solo album, Paranormal, which features a cover of the Villebillies song "Holy Water".

== Musical style ==
Villebillies' music incorporates elements of hip-hop, rock, country, blues, soul and bluegrass. The group has been described as "OutKast meets Kid Rock" and "one of Louisville's most consistently creative hip-hop bands".

The group utilizes a choreographed vocal style which includes rapped verses and harmonic singing by three vocalists. The drum rhythms combine influences from genres of urban and roots music. The main instrumental lineup consists of drums, electric guitar, acoustic guitar, electric bass guitar, and an instant replay machine. Additional instruments that have been featured in Villebillies music include keyboard, banjo, harmonica, brass horn sections, and classical string sections.

The name "Villebillies" [Vill-bill-eez] came from a lyric written by vocalist Derek "Child" Monyhan shortly after joining the group. It is a combination of the words Louisville, the band's hometown and largest urban center in Kentucky, and Hillbilly in reference to Kentucky's rural mountain culture. The name references the cross genre nature of the band's music.

== Band members ==
Current

- Demi Demaree – vocals
- Dustin "Tuck" Tucker – vocals
- Derek "Child" Monyhan – vocals
- Tim Bernauer – drums
- Adam Goff – guitar
- Malcolm McLaughlin – guitar
- Brian Cronin – bass

Past

- David "2B" Mouser – vocals
- James "Dylan" O'Daniel – vocals
- Ron Ping – bass
- Justin Reid – guitar
- William "BJ" Young – keyboards

== Discography ==
=== Albums ===
Release date	Title	Label
September 26, 2006	Villebillies	Universal Motown
September 30, 2008	From the Belly of the Beast	Hack Music
November 12, 2010	Early Times	Island Earth music
February 2012	Appetite for Dysfunction	Island Earth Music
June 11, 2013	Close Encounters	Island Earth Music
November 5, 2013	Love Is Kind Of Crazy	Sony Music Entertainment/RED Associated Labels
October 11, 2016	Holy Water	Island Earth Music

== Awards and nominations ==
All of which obtained in their hometown of Louisville KY

- 2010 LEO Readers Choice Award
  - Winner - Best Hip Hop Artist/Band
- 2009 LEO Readers Choice Award
  - Nominated - Best Hip Hop Artist/Band
- 2008 LEO Readers Choice Award
  - Nominated - Best Hip Hop Artist/band
- 2007 LEO Readers Choice Award
  - Winner - Best Hip Hop Artist/Band
- 2006 LEO Readers Choice Award
  - Winner - Best Original Band
  - Nominated - Best Hip Hop Artist/Band
  - Nominated - Best Local Rock Band
- 2005 LEO Readers Choice Award
  - Winner - Best Hip Hop Artist/Band
  - Nominated - Best New Local Band
  - Nominated - Best Original Band
  - Nominated - Best Country Western Band
  - Nominated - Best Local Web Site
