= Mini Kiss =

American rock band

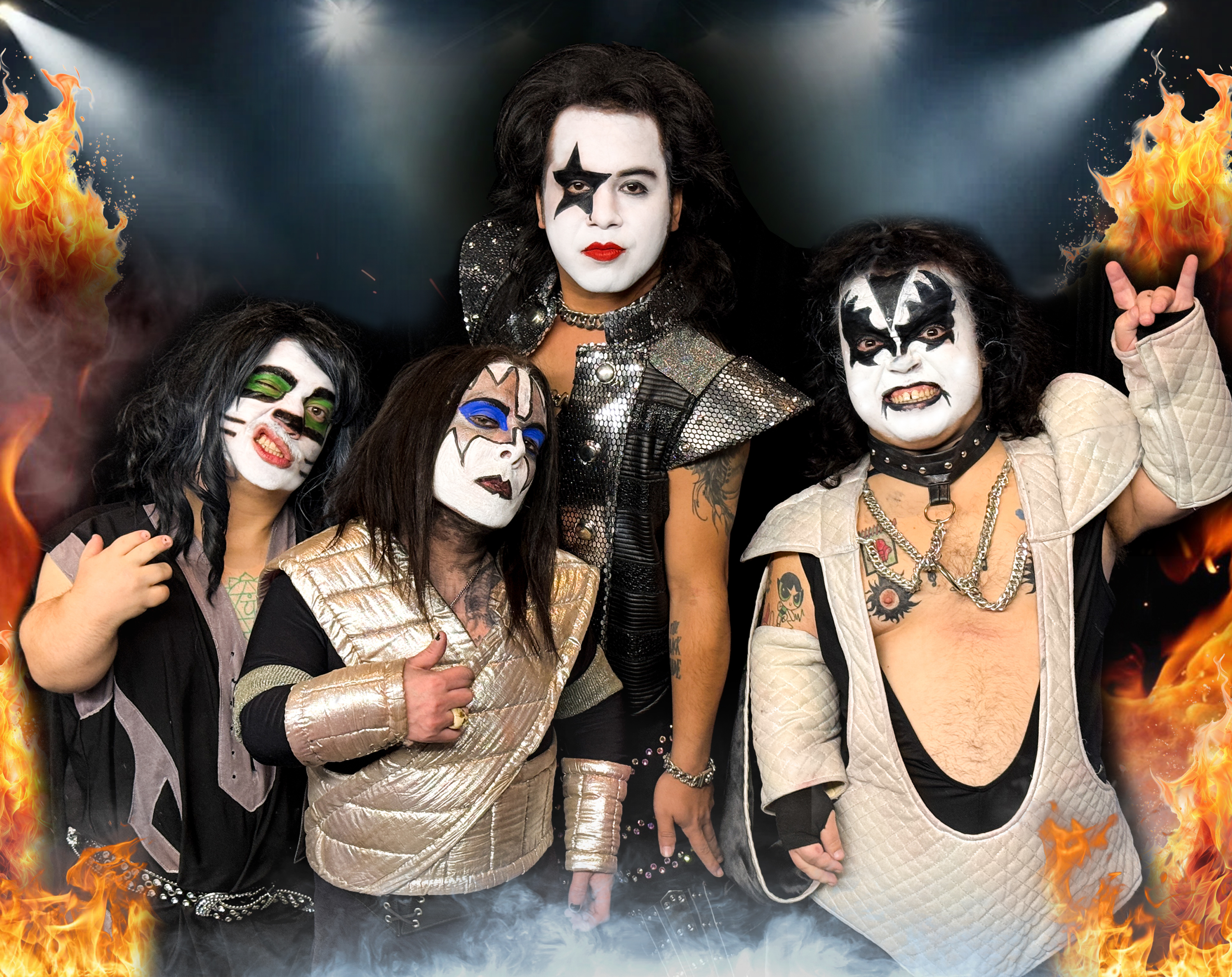

Background information
- Origin: New York City, U.S.
- Genres: Rock
- Years active: 1995–present
- Members: Arturo Knight; Richard Huizenga-Rayos; Nik Sin; Andrew Jacobs
- Past members: Joey Fatale
- Website: minikisses.com

Mini Kiss is a Kiss tribute band made up entirely of little people. The band was founded by bandleader Joey Fatale (4' 4" – Mini Gene) in New York City.

The band has made an appearance in the feature film "Paul Blart Mall Cop 2", the Game Show Network revival of I've Got a Secret and Lip Sync Battle. The band made a cameo on the television series Z Rock, Gene Simmons Family Jewels, The George Lopez Show, Lopez vs. Lopez and a cameo with the real Kiss on the Dr. Pepper TV commercial "A Little Kiss" which aired during Super Bowl XLIV. Fatale died on August 7, 2011. The band still tours regularly performing at shows around the world.

Mini Kiss has toured with Jackyl, Blue Öyster Cult, A Perfect Circle, Air Supply, Peter Frampton and many others.

In March 2023, Mini Kiss received a Guinness World Record for "World's Shortest Male Band" in Milan, Italy on Lo Show Dei Record.
