= Stitches (rapper) =

American rapper

- Also known as: Lil Phill
- Born: Phillip Nickolas Katsabanis; June 17, 1995 (age 31); Miami, Florida, U.S.
- Origin: South Beach, Florida, U.S.
- Genres: Hip hop; trap; horrorcore
- Occupation: Rapper
- Years active: 2014–present
- Label: TMI Gang

Phillip Nickolas Katsabanis (born June 17, 1995), better known by his stage name Stitches, is an American rapper. Prior to adopting the name Stitches, he was known as Lil Phill. He released his first mixtape, No Snitching Is My Statement, in 2014, followed by a debut album in 2015, titled For Drug Dealers Only.

== Personal life ==
Katsabanis was born on June 17, 1995, in Miami, Florida, to Esther and Alexander Katsabanis, who divorced when Katsabanis was one year old. Of Greek and Cuban descent, Katsabanis grew up in Kendall, Florida, a suburb of Miami. The rapper said he began selling cocaine and guns to support himself after moving to South Beach, Florida, from Miami.

Katsabanis was married from 2012 to 2017, and has three children.

In August 2022, Katsabanis was arrested on cocaine and weapons charges. Prosecutors declined to pursue charges because a month later, the police had not submitted the cocaine Katsabanis was alleged to possess to a lab for testing. On Sept 15, 2022, all charges were dropped.

== Discography ==
=== Studio albums ===
- For Drug Dealers Only (2015)
- Tales of a Drug Lord (2016)
- Cocaine Holiday (2017)
- I Need Rehab (2017)
- Bipolar (2018)
- Time for Murder (2018)
- Married to the Bricks (2020)
- Finally Sober (2025)

=== Collaborative albums ===
- Alligator Alcatraz (with Forgiato Blow and FJ Outlaw) (2025)

=== Guest appearances ===
- "305 x 4817" (Rhye$ Rhyme$ featuring Stitches) (2026)
- "Take'em Out" (Rhye$ Rhyme$ featuring Stitches) (2026)

=== Mixtapes ===
- No Snitching Is My Statement (2014)
- Brick Bible (2015)
- Supply and Demand (2015)
- Brick Bible 2 (2019)
