= Procurement (disambiguation) =

Procurement is the process of finding, agreeing terms and acquiring goods, services or works from an external source and may also refer to:

- Procuring (prostitution)
- Government procurement or public procurement, the procurement of goods, services or constructions on behalf of a public authority
- E-procurement
- Indirect procurement
- Military acquisition (Military Procurement)
- Sustainable procurement
- Organ procurement
- Procure-to-pay
- Syndicated procurement

== See also ==
- Procuration
- Procuring (disambiguation)
