= Taking =

Taking or The Taking may refer to:

- Theft, illicit taking
- The acquisition of land under eminent domain
- Take (hunting) or taking, an action that adversely affects a species
- Kidnapping of persons

== Arts and entertainment ==
- The Taking, a 2003 novel by J. D. Landis
- The Taking (novel), a 2004 novel by Dean Koontz
- The Taking, a 2004 short film directed by Matt Eskandari
- The Taking (album), a 2011 studio album by Loaded
- "The Taking", a 2012 episode of the Canadian television series The Listener
- "Taking", the a 2019 song by Alex G on his album House of Sugar
- The Taking, a 2021 documentary film written and directed by Alexandre O. Philippe

== See also ==
- Take (disambiguation)
- Taken (disambiguation)
- Took (disambiguation)
