= Acquisition =

Acquisition may refer to:

- Takeover, the purchase of one company by another
- Mergers and acquisitions, transactions in which the ownership of companies or their operating units are transferred or consolidated with other entities
- Procurement, finding, agreeing terms and acquiring goods, services or works from an external source
- Library acquisitions, department of a library responsible for the selection and purchase of materials
- Military acquisition, the process of acquiring products for national defense
- Acquiring bank, a bank or financial institution that processes credit or debit card payments on behalf of a merchant
- Acquisition (forensic process), the creation of a disk image for use in digital forensics
- Acquisition (linguistic), process by which humans acquire the capacity to perceive and comprehend language
- Acquisition (psychology), learning
- Acquisition stage, the time during which a conditional response first appears and when it increases in frequency
- Acquisition (Star Trek: Enterprise)

== See also ==
- Accession (disambiguation)
- Acquire, board game
- Acquire (company)
- Acquired characteristic
- Acquired lands
- Acquired taste
- Buy (disambiguation)
- Get (disambiguation)
- Procurement (disambiguation)
- Taken (disambiguation)
- Taker (disambiguation)
- The Take (disambiguation)
