= Dynamic discounting =

Payment terms which accelerate payment in exchange for a discount

In finance, dynamic discounting describes a collection of methods in which payment terms can be established between a buyer and supplier to accelerate payment for goods or services in return for a reduced price or discount.

Dynamic discounting methods are used for business-to-business transactions when contractual or pre-established early payment terms may not exist or the payment date does not conform to agreed upon discount terms. Dynamic discounting includes the ability to agree upon terms that vary the discount according to the date of early payment. The earlier the payment, the greater the discount. In addition, it includes an ability for either buyer or supplier to propose an early payment date and discount for a one-time payment using email or specialized software.

Through the use of dynamic discounting methods, buying organizations can increase the number and size of early payment discounts they receive and suppliers can get paid sooner at a lower cost of capital than alternative options. A range of concepts is available to implement dynamic discounting into supply chain finance (SCF): dynamic discounting can be seen as a comparatively simple form, whereby the supplier grants a cash discount for early payment of its invoices – the amount of the reduction and the time of payment are quickly and freely negotiable.

== History ==
The opportunity to earn discounts in exchange for early payment in business-to-business commerce has been limited, historically, by the length of time necessary for accounts payable's to receive and approve paper invoices. An invoice that takes 20 days to be approved, for example, cannot be paid in time to qualify for a discount available from a supplier for payment on day 10. With the advent of electronic invoicing and Purchase-to-Pay (P2P) automation enabled by the Internet, buying organizations are increasingly able to approve invoices faster and take advantage of available discounts.

Dynamic discounting methods were invented and later patented by Xign Corporation in the early 2000s to help businesses take advantage of these trends and establish early payment terms with suppliers. Since then software enabling dynamic discounts has become a common feature of procure-to-pay automation products. More recently, dynamic discount methods are being implemented via auction sites that enable buyers and suppliers to negotiate payment terms and discounts across large amounts of their spend.

== How does it work? ==
The buying organization offers to pay their suppliers early in exchange for a discount. The earlier the payment, the greater the discount.

Historically, it's not always been easy to achieve arrangements that work for both supplier and buyer and because of practical problems, it hasn't always been easy for buyers to actually pay early. But with the increased use of Purchase to Pay (P2P) technologies and methods there is now no reason why a buyer cannot pay promptly depending on how the collaborative arrangements with the supplier have been agreed.

An example of why dynamic discounting is beneficial to buyers is as follows. If a buyer receives a 2 per cent discount for early payment of an invoice—for example paying a 30-day-net invoice after 10 days. Therefore, instead of earning interest on the cash held in an account, it is "invested" for 20 days to get a 2 per cent return, This represents the equivalent of an over 36 per cent annual return on capital. While the early payment of the invoice would lead to a reduction in interest on the cash, the return for early payment far outweighs the loss of interest. That early payment may also be very valuable to the supplier who values cash flow more than high margins.

Some suppliers find securing credit difficult or expensive. By collaborating with customers and using a P2P system, both parties can lower purchasing prices, reduce borrowing costs, and decrease overall operating expenses.

== Features ==
- Discount amount is calculated dynamically based on the number of days remaining until the due date
- Discounts do not need to be negotiated in advance, rather the buyer can set a liquidity limit and interest rates and allow the supplier to dynamically take discounts as working capital needs dictate
- Trading parties can tap into a risk-free, alternative source of working capital with the use of third party creditors whom pay early on behalf of the buyer

== Benefits ==
Dynamic discounting offers suppliers the flexibility of discounting some or all of their receivables, eliminating the need to use high-cost financing options like factoring or asset-based lending to obtain cash liquidity and stronger balance sheet positions. It also mitigates the uncertainty surrounding the timing and amount of payments, allowing for superior cash flow forecasting capabilities.

On the other hand, supplier financing can enable buyers to extend their payment terms with the injection of third party capital. These benefits accrue without adversely affecting trading partner relations. Dynamic discounting is based on a buyer's credit rating instead of being pegged to the supplier's risk, further strengthening buyer-supplier relationships.

- Allows buyers to pay their suppliers early in exchange for a discount.
- Allows buyers to benefit from double-digit, risk-free returns.
- Reduces large organizations annual spend by earning significantly more early payment discounts through additional discounts on non-discount invoices and maximum capture of traditional discounts.
- Strengthens the financial supply chain and supplier relationships by providing suppliers with quick, easy access to cash.
- Fully integrated in / between two ERP-Systems the supplier can benefit from the transparency of received invoices on the buyer-side and possibly even use an integrated advice of settlement as value ad in his payment cockpit *(e.g. SAP).
