= Catalogue number =

A catalogue number (British English) or catalog number (American English) may refer to:

- Any number used to identify an item in a catalog (disambiguation), including:
  - Accession number (disambiguation), in libraries and museums
  - Auction catalogue
  - Catalog number (music), a number assigned by a record label
  - Catalog number (commercial products), a number assigned to an item for sale by a commercial vendor
  - Satellite Catalog Number, a 5-digit number assigned by the US to satellites
