= Taker =

Taker may refer to:

- Eminent domain
- The Undertaker (born 1965), American professional wrestler and actor
- Undertaker, a funeral director
- Takers, 2010 American film
- Houston Takers, American Basketball Association team
- The Taker/Tulsa, 1971 album by Waylon Jennings

== See also ==
- Take (disambiguation)
- Acquisition (disambiguation)
- Census taker (disambiguation)
- Makers and Takers, 2008 book by Peter Schweizer
- "Givers and Takers", song by S-K-O, 1988
- Takers and Leavers, EP by Dr. Dog
