= Chris Benoit (song) =

Single by Insane Clown Posse

Single by Insane Clown Posse

from the album The Mighty Death Pop!
- Released: 2012
- Recorded: Fun House Studio
- Genre: Horrorcore
- Length: 3:23
- Label: Psychopathic
- Songwriters: Insane Clown Posse; Mike E. Clark
- Producer: Mike E. Clark

Insane Clown Posse singles chronology
"It's All Over" (2011)	"Chris Benoit" (2012)	"Freaky Tales" (2012)

Music video
- "Chris Benoit" on YouTube

"Chris Benoit" is a song written by Insane Clown Posse and Mike E. Clark for the duo's 2012 album The Mighty Death Pop! A music video was filmed in June 2012, directed by the Deka Brothers. The album's concept "teaches us to respect the life we’ve been given and do our best to avoid an early death." The song was named after the professional wrestler, who died in a murder-suicide after killing his wife and son. A remix of the song appeared on the remix album Mike E. Clark's Extra Pop Emporium, and featured rappers Ice Cube and Scarface. This song was released 5 years after his death.

== Music and lyrics ==
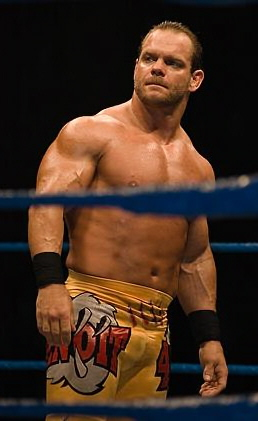
Professional wrestler Chris Benoit, whose double murder and suicide inspired the song.

Inspiration for the song came from wrestler Chris Benoit, who murdered his wife and son before committing suicide. Insane Clown Posse broadly alluded to the murders in the song's lyrics, but the focus of the song is not the murders themselves, but of suddenly losing one's sanity, and eclipsing in violence. The song pertains to the album's overall concept, which "teaches us to respect the life we've been given and do our best to avoid an early death." The song was remixed by Kuma for the remix album Mike E. Clark's Extra Pop Emporium. The remix featured additional verses by Ice Cube and Scarface.

== Music video ==
The music video for "Chris Benoit" was filmed in June 2012, five years after the Chris Benoit murders took place. It was the first music video from The Mighty Death Pop! Violent J allowed French directors the Deka Brothers to exercise creative control over the video, with ICP's only input being a request for "minimal wrestling scenes" and "plenty of slow-motion, blur and artsy abstraction". Also in the video there were a few stock picture flashes of Chris Benoit himself. Violent J wanted the video to look like those made by Nirvana and was impressed with the Deka Brothers' work on Skrillex's First of the Year (Equinox). The music video aired on July 26–27, 2012 during a live episode of Violent J's "The Witching Hours" on Psychopathic Radio. The music video was later released on the Psychopathic Records YouTube channel.

== Reception ==
The Houston Press criticized the song, suggesting that it glorified the wrestler's murders. The video also stirred controversy, for the same reason. Spin said that the song uses the wrestler's psyche "to stare into the void". Graveside Entertainment cited "Chris Benoit" as a standout of the Mighty Death Pop!, calling it one of Insane Clown Posse's darkest songs, writing "ICP wisely took a more subtle approach focusing on the mind state someone like Benoit may have had during and after the act and it works extremely well."

Nathan Foster, of Classic Rock History, ranked the song #1 in the list of the band's best songs.
