= Procure-to-pay =

Specific subdivision of the procurement process

Procure-to-pay (also known as Purchase to Pay (P2P)) is a term used in the software industry to designate a specific subdivision of the procurement process.

The P2P systems enable the integration of the purchasing department with the accounts payable (AP) department. Some of the largest players of the software industry agree on a common definition of procure-to-pay, linking the procurement process and financial department. The steps usually included are:

- Supply management
- Cart or requisition
- Purchase order
- Receiving
- Invoice reconciliation
- Accounts payable

Unlike source-to-pay systems, procure-to-pay systems do not include the function of sourcing. Also, notions of production planning and forecasting are excluded from this definition since it relates to the supply chain management.

== Benefits ==
Procure-to-pay systems are designed to provide organizations with control and visibility over the entire life-cycle of a transaction, providing full insight into cash-flow and financial commitments. Most of the companies using these systems look for a centralization of their procurement department, or to set up a shared services organization for the same purpose. There are steps to follow to complete the full process, this ensures there are reduced errors and frauds. Electronic capture records all the transactions making it easy to track them.

According to the Aberdeen Group, despite the availability of technology which can dramatically reduce the mountains of paperwork and inefficiencies plaguing accounts payable, few companies have addressed AP transformation like other processes essential to the business.

== Risks ==
As with any system that touches a significant number of users, implementing a procure-to-pay system requires significant knowledge of the as-is business processes as well as the to-be. Change management is a key component in implementing a procure-to-pay solution. According to Deloitte, a few procure-to-pay challenges which ultimately impair the ability to manage and execute key activities effectively are:

- "Finance does not provide sufficient information to support decision making (e.g., spend analytics)"
- "Data governance and quality are inadequate to make informed decisions and meet Finance stakeholder needs (e.g., Vendor Master Data)"
- "The absence of, limited, or multiple/unintegrated systems supporting the process"
- "Customization of ERP which leads to abnormal entries being processed"
- "Lack of ERP knowledge/training among users which facilitates incorrect transaction processing"

== See also ==
- Supply chain and supply chain management
- E-procurement
- Purchase-to-pay
- Spend management
- Contract management
- Purchasing
- Procurement outsourcing
- Shared services
