= Zug Izland =

American rock band

- Origin: Detroit, Michigan, U.S.
- Genres: Hard rock, alternative rock
- Years active: 2001–2009, 2012-present
- Labels: Psychopathic Records (2001–2004, 2012–2015); Independent (2004–2012, 2015–present)
- Spinoff of: Insane Clown Posse
- Members: Syn; 2 Phat; Mike P D-Lay
- Past members: Guido Milligan; Violent J Dan Miller; Lil Pig; Rex Hamilton; The Son Of Rock, Joey V. B. Nestor Hendricks; David Vied

Zug Izland is an American rock band from Detroit, Michigan. The group sometimes refers to its fans as "zuggalos".

== History ==
Zug Izland formed in 2001, named after an industrial site near Detroit. The band was formed by Insane Clown Posse member Violent J (Joseph Bruce) and Mike Puwal, out of Bruce's love of rock music. Bruce wanted to know what a "Juggalo Rock" band would sound like. Zug Izland's songs were written and developed during the recording of Insane Clown Posse's album The Wraith: Shangri-La.

Bruce and Puwal completed the basic tracks for two songs, but still required a lead singer. Bruce wanted a singer similar to Kurt Cobain, Eddie Vedder, Jim Morrison or Axl Rose. Although Syn was sought by three other bands at the time, he joined Zug Izland as their official singer. The band broke onto the national competitive music scene in 2003 with their debut album, Cracked Tiles, which was followed by tours with King's X and Dope.

The album peaked at No. 48 on the Billboard Heatseekers chart and at No. 31 on the Top Independent Albums chart. Zug Izland released a follow-up album 3:33 the 1st of June 2004. It peaked at No. 26 on the Top Heatseekers chart and at No. 22 on the Top Independent Albums chart. The release of the 3:33 album amicably fulfilled Psychopathic Records contract with Zug Izland.

Zug Izland would depart from Psychopathic Records due to financial issues later that year. During this time, they started recording songs for a new album titled The Promised Land. Certain tracks like "Next To Me", "How Does It Feel?", and "Lies" were released officially online with leaked songs "Promised land" and "Woke Up Screaming" surfacing online some time later, along with "Chemical Girl".

In 2005, Zug Izland recorded a cover of Pink Floyd classic "Another Brick In The Wall". The track was a crowd favourite that Zug Izland would often cover at their live shows. Re-working the lyrics, the new track took a "Juggalo" theme replacing Pink Floyd's child chorus with a group of angry Juggalos screaming "Hey! People! Leave Juggalos alone!" in reference to the Juggalo culture's misrepresentation in mainstream media. The finished track was made available through the ZugIzland.com, but never made available on an official release.

Following years of touring and various line up changes, Zug Izland reunited, and returned to Psychopathic Records, announcing plans to reissue Cracked Tiles, record a new album, and tour with Insane Clown Posse in promotion of ICP's Mighty Death Pop! album. In the December 21, 2012 edition of Hatchet Herald, it was revealed that Zug Izland would release a "greatest hits" album, featuring three newly recorded songs recorded by Violent J and Mike Puwal.

In August 2013, Zug Izland's greatest hits compilation, Toxicology: Zug Izland's Dopest Bangers, was released on Psychopathic Records, their first official release since 3:33 in 2004. The album featured a collection of tracks from their debut album Cracked Tiles, three remastered songs from 3:33 and three new recordings. The new songs reverted to the writing/recording process of Cracked Tiles with Violent J of Insane Clown Posse writing lyrics and Mike P writing the music.

In 2016, they finally released, via the independent record label So What I Think Is Kool Records, The Promised Land, as an album named The Promised Land / Nebula, an album which contained tracks from The Promised Land. These tracks would be remixed for the album. There were also remixes of previous tracks too. Syn would release a video in promotion of the album, a music video for the song "Promised Land", and stated that the group planned to drop 4 of these kinds of albums. Two years later, they would release The Promised Land / Event Horizon. Event Horizon also contained remixes of past songs, new tracks, and a remix of "Promised Land" with Sewerside.

Guido Milligan died on April 7, 2021.

According to Faygoluvers.net, the lineup is now Syn, Mike P, D-Lay and 2 Phat.

== Band members ==
Current

- Syn — vocals (2001–2009, 2012–present)
- 2 Phat – drums (2005–2009, 2018–present)
- Mike P. — guitar (2001–2004, 2012–present)
- D-Lay — bass (2012–present)
- DJ Clay – DJ (2012–present)

Former

- Guido Milligan — bass (2001–2002, 2004; deceased)
- Rex Hamilton — bass (2004–2007)
- Dan Miller — keyboards (2003–2004)
- Lil Pig – drums (2001–2004, 2012–2017)
- Joey V. – lead guitar (2007–2009, 2012)
- David Vied – bass (2007–2009)
- Nestor Hendricks – bass (2003)
- Violent J – vocals (2001)

== Discography ==
- Cracked Tiles (2003, Psychopathic Records)
- 3:33 (2004, Ax & Smash Records/Psychopathic Records)
- Toxicology: Zug Izlands Dopest Bangers (2013, Psychopathic Records)
- The Promised Land / Nebula (2016, independent release)
- The Promised Land / Event Horizon (2018, independent release)
