= Bidder conferences =

Bidder Conferences are common for major projects and programs that are intended to be performed as Cross-Corporate Project Business activities. They are used once the owners of the project have decided to buy work items from the sellers, who may be product vendors and/or service providers. A Bidder Conference reflects the project owners’ intentions that all vendors have an equal understanding of the project's requirements and the procurement processes before they submit their offers. This ensures that the bidding process is fair to all parties involved.

Typically, before RFQs (Requests for Quotation), such as RFPs (Requests for Proposal), ITBs (Invitations to Bid), or similar, are sent out to potential bidders. A Bidder Conference is organized as a key part of the bidding process by the owners of the project, who now become the buyers. Often, participation in the Bidder Conference is a prerequisite to being allowed to enrol and join the actual bidding process thereafter. Therefore, in most cases, the Bidder Conference is held during early stages of the bidding procedure.

== Common Stages of Bidder Conferences ==
Invitations to Bidder Conferences often implement strict rules that are communicated to the invited sellers.[i]

A common key element of the Bidder Conference is the presentation of the project. Bidders are also introduced to the procurement process, including the buyers' Terms and Conditions (T&C) of purchasing, and any compliance requirements that apply to the bidding process, and later to the execution of the project. Sellers are also familiarized with the contract partners to whom they will have to submit their offers and within the timeline of their expected contributions to the project, specifically, the submission date of the offer.

Then, the Conference enters the Question & Answer (Q&A) session, during which bidders raise questions and are given the opportunities to discuss the factors or matters they have identified upon reviewing the project that they wish to be clarified or adjusted. An important aspect here is that while one seller asks a question, all other sellers have equal access to the question, as well as the answers given in the responses by the project owners.[ii]

== Purpose of Bidder Conferences ==
The Bidder Conference is an invaluable opportunity for both parties to exchange views and ideas, as well as to get to know one another at the early stages of the project.

The most critical intention of a Bidder Conference is to ensure that equal information is available to all the sellers, and that no discrimination takes place. In industrial Project Business, this is considered as a matter of fairness and good governance. In government projects, these are often part of the legal requirements. If a bidder who has lost the business against a competitor, can make a case at the court of law that the bidding process was discriminatory, the bidder can then protest the buyer's decision. The project will come to a halt, wasting both money and time, until the court has finalized its decision. Even if the buyer eventually wins the court case, the project in question has already been delayed and its budget has been exceeded. Therefore, a Bidder Conference is often used in government procurement to make the project “protest-proof”, as it is a process to document that all bidders had access to the same information.

The Bidder Conference is more often than not open to all prospective bidders, either collectively or independently. The Conference is often compulsory and forms a significant part of the entire bidding process.

== Next Steps After the Bidder Conference ==
During the Bidder Conference, minutes are taken and distributed to the participants upon the conclusion of the event.

Following the Conference, sellers will either formulate their intentions to offer their products and services and become the actual bidders or elect to withdraw from the entire bidding process.

A common next step is that the sellers will respond to the RFIs (Requests for Information), introducing themselves and revealing information about their businesses to the buyers. If they are accepted as bidders and/or potential contractors, they will then contact the responsible individuals for their business areas, obtain the RFPs (Requests for Proposal), ITBs (Invitations to Bid), and/or similar procurement documents, and submit their offers in the form of Bids, proposals, and/or other types/format of offer documents.

Bidders whose offers will be accepted by the owners of the project will become future contractors, and the project owners will become the customers. This is what makes the Project Business relationships distinctive and unique.

== Virtual Bidder Conferences ==
In today's business world, the Bidder Conferences are more often held remotely using modern communication technologies, such as video-conferencing and other tele-conferencing software and platforms. Enabling Virtual Bidder Conference functionalities is a crucial feature in most of the Procurement Portals. Virtual Bidder Conferences permit bidding contenders the opportunities to engage wherever they are located geographically, thus making the whole bidding process much more competitive and more cost-efficient.

== Synonyms ==
A number of terms are used interchangeably, among them:

- Bidder Conference[iii]

- Bidder's Conference[iv]

- Bidders’ Conference[v]

- Pre-Bid Conference[vi]

== See also ==
- Bidding
- Indirect procurement
- Engineering, procurement, and construction
