= Accession =

Accession refers to the general idea of joining or adding to. It may also refer to:

- Accession (property law)
- Accession, the act of joining a treaty by a party that did not take part in its negotiations; see Vienna Convention on the Law of Treaties#Signature, ratification and accession
  - Ratification
  - EU Accession
- Accession to the throne; not to be confused with the later ceremony of Coronation
  - Enthronement
  - Accession day, when an heir becomes monarch, and its anniversary
- Accession to elected office; inauguration
- Accession number (disambiguation)
  - Accession number (cultural property), a catalogue number assigned to an object when it becomes part of a library or museum collection
  - Accession number (bioinformatics), a unique identifier given to a biological polymer sequence (DNA, protein) when it is submitted to a sequence database
- Accession (Star Trek: Deep Space Nine)
- Accession Records, a record label created by Adrian Hates
- Instrument of Accession, a legal document introduced in 1935, used in 1947 to enable the rulers of the princely states formerly in British India to join India or Pakistan
- Instrument of Accession (Jammu and Kashmir), by which that state joined the Dominion of India (1947)
  - Accession Day (Jammu and Kashmir), a public holiday
- Library accession, better known as Library acquisitions.

== See also ==
- Acquisition (disambiguation)
