= Cheryl's Birthday =

Viral logic puzzle

"Cheryl's Birthday" is a logic puzzle, specifically a knowledge puzzle. The objective is to determine the birthday of a girl named Cheryl using a handful of clues given to her friends Albert and Bernard. Written by Dr Joseph Yeo Boon Wooi of Singapore's National Institute of Education, the question was posed as part of the Singapore and Asian Schools Math Olympiad (SASMO) in 2015, and was first posted online by Singapore television presenter Kenneth Kong. It went viral in a matter of days and also hit national television in all major cities globally. Henry Ong, the Founder of SASMO was interviewed by Singapore's Mediacorp program FIVE hosts Chua En Lai and Yasmine Yonkers.

== Origin ==
An early version of Cheryl's Birthday, with different names and dates, appeared in an online forum in 2006. The SASMO version of the question was posted on Facebook by Singapore television presenter Kenneth Kong on April 10, 2015, and quickly went viral. Kong posted the puzzle following a debate with his wife, and he incorrectly thought it to be part of a mathematics question for a primary school examination, aimed at 10- to 11-year-old students, although it was actually part of the 2015 Singapore and Asian Schools Math Olympiad meant for 14-year-old students, a fact later acknowledged by Kong. The competition was held on 8 April 2015, with 28,000 participants from Singapore, Thailand, Vietnam, China and the UK. According to SASMO's organisers, the quiz was aimed at the top 40 per cent of the contestants and aimed to "sift out the better students". SASMO's executive director told the BBC that "there was a place for some kind of logical and analytical thinking in the workplace and in our daily lives".

== The question ==
The question is number 24 in a list of 25 questions, and reads as follows:

Albert and Bernard just became friends with Cheryl, and they want to know when her birthday is. Cheryl gives them a list of 10 possible dates:

- May 15, May 16, May 19
- June 17, June 18
- July 14, July 16
- August 14, August 15, August 17

Cheryl then tells Albert and Bernard separately the month and the day of her birthday respectively.

Albert: I don't know when Cheryl's birthday is, but I know that Bernard doesn't know too. [sic]
Bernard: At first I don't [sic] know when Cheryl's birthday is, but I know now.
Albert: Then I also know when Cheryl's birthday is.

So when is Cheryl's birthday?

== Solution ==
Lines A1 cancel dates eliminated after Albert's first remark, B eliminations after Bernard's remark, and A2 eliminations after Albert's second remark, leaving July 16

The answer to the question is July 16.

The candidate dates may be written in a grid:

May		15	16			19
June				17	18	
July	14		16			
August	14	15		17		

The answer can be deduced by progressively eliminating impossible dates. This is how Alex Bellos in the UK newspaper The Guardian presented its outcome:

Albert: I don't know when Cheryl's birthday is, but I know that Bernard doesn't know [either].

All Albert knows is the month, and every month has more than one possible date, so of course he doesn't know when her birthday is. The first part of the sentence is redundant.

The only way that Bernard could know the date with a single number, however, would be if Cheryl had told him 18 or 19, since of the ten date options these are the only numbers that appear just once, as May 19 and June 18.

For Albert to know that Bernard does not know, Albert must therefore have been told July or August, since this rules out Bernard being told 18 or 19.

Line 2) Bernard: At first I don't know when Cheryl's birthday is, but now I know.

Bernard has deduced that Albert has either August or July. If he knows the full date, he must have been told 15, 16 or 17, since if he had been told 14 he would be none the wiser about whether the month was August or July. Each of 15, 16 and 17 only refers to one specific month, but 14 could be either month.

Line 3) Albert: Then I also know when Cheryl's birthday is.

Albert has therefore deduced that the possible dates are July 16, Aug 15 and Aug 17. For him to now know, he must have been told July. If he had been told August, he would not know which date for certain is the birthday.

Therefore, the answer is July 16.

=== Incorrect solution ===
Solution to the Cheryl's birthday puzzle had someone initially announced that Bernard did not know Cheryl's birthday. Line B1 cancel dates eliminated after that remark, A1 the elimination after Albert's first remark, leaving August 17 (Bernard must have been told "17" to be able to know for sure) as B2, with A2 confirming it for Albert.

After the question went viral, some people suggested August 17 as an alternative answer to the question. This was rejected by the Singapore and Asian School Math Olympiads as an invalid answer.

The solutions that arrive at this answer ignore that the latter part of:

Albert: I don't know when Cheryl's birthday is, but I know that Bernard doesn't know too.

conveys information to Bernard about how Albert was able to deduce this. Bernard would only have known the birthday if the date was unique, 18 or 19. Albert therefore is able to deduce that "Bernard doesn't know" because he heard a month that does not contain those dates (July or August). Realizing this, Bernard can rule out May and June, which allows him to arrive at a unique birthday even if he is given the dates 15 or 16, not just 17.

The SASMO organizers pointed out that August 17 would be the solution if the sequence of statements instead began with Bernard saying that he did not know Cheryl's birthday:

Bernard: I don't know when Cheryl's birthday is.

Albert: I still don't know when Cheryl's birthday is.
Bernard: At first I didn't know when Cheryl's birthday is, but I know now.

Albert: Then I also know when Cheryl's birthday is.

In this case, Bernard's first statement eliminates May 19 and June 18, and consequently June 17 (if Albert were told "June", he could have concluded it was June 17), leaving May 15 and 16 uneliminated unlike in the original. Albert's first statement eliminates dates left on multiple months, leaving August 17. Their second statements are redundant.

It would also be the answer if the first statement were instead made by Cheryl:

Cheryl: Bernard doesn't know when my birthday is.

Albert: I still don't know when Cheryl's birthday is.
Bernard: At first I didn't know when Cheryl's birthday is, but I know now.

Albert: Then I also know when Cheryl's birthday is.

Note: The final statements by Albert in the two alternative examples only completes a dialogue; they are not needed by the reader to determine Cheryl's birthday as August 17.

== Sequel ==
On May 14, 2015, Nanyang Technological University uploaded a second part to the question on Facebook, entitled "Cheryl's Age". It reads as follows:

Albert and Bernard now want to know how old Cheryl is.

Cheryl: I have two younger brothers. The product of all our ages (i.e. my age and the ages of my two brothers) is 144, assuming that we use whole numbers for our ages.
Albert: We still don't know your age. What other hints can you give us?
Cheryl: The sum of all our ages is the bus number of this bus that we are on.
Bernard: Of course we know the bus number, but we still don't know your age.
Cheryl: Oh, I forgot to tell you that my brothers have the same age.

Albert and Bernard: Oh, now we know your age.

So what is Cheryl's age?

Note that this problem is a slight variation of another problem, previously presented by Martin Gardner.

=== Solution to sequel ===
144 can be decomposed into prime number factors by the fundamental theorem of arithmetic (144 = 2^{4} × 3^{2}), and all possible ages for Cheryl and her two brothers examined (for example, 16, 9, 1, or 8, 6, 3, and so on). The sums of the ages can then be computed. Because Bernard (who knows the bus number) cannot determine Cheryl's age despite having been told this sum, it must be a sum that is not unique among the possible solutions. On examining all the possible ages, it turns out there are two pairs of sets of possible ages that produce the same sum as each other: 9, 4, 4 and 8, 6, 3, which sum to 17, and 12, 4, 3 and 9, 8, 2, which sum to 19. Cheryl then says that her brothers are the same age, which eliminates the last three possibilities and leaves only 9, 4, 4, so we can deduce that Cheryl is 9 years old and her brothers are 4 years old, and the bus the three of them are on has the number 17.

=== Second sequel: "Denise's Revenge" ===
On May 25, 2015, mathematics writer Alex Bellos published a follow-up to the puzzle, entitled "Denise's Revenge", in his column "Alex Bellos's Monday Puzzle" in The Guardian. This sequel was also written by Dr Yeo, the original author of "Cheryl's Birthday". The puzzle features a new character, Denise, whose birth date the three original characters aim to determine. The puzzle states:

Albert, Bernard and Cheryl became friends with Denise, and they wanted to know when her birthday is. Denise gave them a list of 20 possible dates.

17 Feb 2001, 16 Mar 2002, 13 Jan 2003, 19 Jan 2004
13 Mar 2001, 15 Apr 2002, 16 Feb 2003, 18 Feb 2004
13 Apr 2001, 14 May 2002, 14 Mar 2003, 19 May 2004
15 May 2001, 12 Jun 2002, 11 Apr 2003, 14 Jul 2004
17 Jun 2001, 16 Aug 2002, 16 Jul 2003, 18 Aug 2004

Denise then told Albert, Bernard and Cheryl separately the month, the day and the year of her birthday respectively. The following conversation ensues:

Albert: I don't know when Denise's birthday is, but I know that Bernard does not know.
Bernard: I still don't know when Denise's birthday is, but I know that Cheryl still does not know.
Cheryl: I still don't know when Denise's birthday is, but I know that Albert still does not know.
Albert: Now I know when Denise's birthday is.
Bernard: Now I know too.
Cheryl: Me too.

So, when is Denise's birthday?

The next day, Bellos published the solution to "Denise's Revenge", which is solved in the same way as "Cheryl's Birthday", by successive eliminations. The correct solution is 14 May 2002.

On 31 March 2025, another sequel was published in The Guardian entitled "Cheryl’s house number problem".

== See also ==
- Ages of Three Children puzzle
- Sum and Product Puzzle
