= Cracked Tiles =

Studio album by Zug Izland
- Released: January 28, 2003
- Length: 53:55
- Label: Psychopathic
- Producer: Mike P.; Syn; Violent J

Zug Izland chronology
| Cracked Tiles (2003) | 3:33 (2004) |

Singles from Cracked Tiles
- 1. "Fire" Released: July 9, 2002

Professional ratings
Review scores
| Source | Rating |
|---|---|
| RapReviews | 6/10 |

Cracked Tiles is the debut studio album by American rock band Zug Izland. It was released on January 28, 2003, through Psychopathic Records. Production was handled by Mike P., Syn and Violent J. It features guest appearances from Insane Clown Posse, Anybody Killa, Blaze Ya Dead Homie, Jamie Madrox and Joy Sparks. The album debuted at number 48 on the Heatseekers Albums and number 31 on the Independent Albums charts in the United States.

== Track listing ==
| No. | Title | Writer(s) | Length |
|---|---|---|---|
| 1. | "Intro" | Joseph Bruce; Michael J. Puwal | 1:00 |
| 2. | "Fire" (featuring Insane Clown Posse) | Bruce; Puwal; Joseph Utsler | 2:52 |
| 3. | "Sunny Day" | Bruce; Puwal | 4:20 |
| 4. | "Prison Song" | Bruce; Puwal | 4:45 |
| 5. | "Fly" (featuring Insane Clown Posse) | Bruce; Puwal; Utsler | 4:32 |
| 6. | "Suicide" | Bruce; Puwal | 3:16 |
| 7. | "Dreams" | Bruce; Puwal | 4:35 |
| 8. | "The River" | Bruce; Puwal | 4:33 |
| 9. | "Small Town" (featuring Insane Clown Posse) | Bruce; Puwal; Utsler | 4:37 |
| 10. | "Always" | Bruce; Puwal | 3:40 |
| 11. | "Hiroshima" (featuring Insane Clown Posse) | Bruce; Puwal; Utsler | 4:34 |
| 12. | "Cry" (featuring Joy Sparks) | Gerard McMahon; Mike Mainieri | 5:04 |
| 13. | "Slam!" | Bruce; Puwal | 1:55 |
| 14. | "Synplicity" (featuring Anybody Killa, Blaze Ya Dead Homie and Jamie Madrox) | Bruce; Puwal; James Lowery; Chris Rouleau; Jamie Spaniolo | 4:12 |
| Total length: | | | 53:55 |

Notes

- Track 12 is a cover of "Cry Little Sister" written by Gerard McMahon and Mike Mainieri.
- Track 13 stylised in all caps.

== Personnel ==
- Syn — lead and backing vocals, producer
- Michael J. "Mike P" Puwal — backing vocals, composer, programming, producer, arranger, recording, engineering, mixing, editing
- Guido Milligan — bass (tracks: 2, 4, 8)
- Ashley "Lil' Pig" Horak — drums (tracks: 2, 4-6, 8, 11, 12)
- Joseph "Violent J" Bruce — lyrics, rap vocals (tracks: 2, 5, 9, 11), additional backing vocals, producer, arranger, editing, design, concept
- Joseph "Shaggy 2 Dope" Utsler — rap vocals (tracks: 2, 5, 9, 11), additional backing vocals, scratches
- Natalie Bruno — additional spoken word (track 7)
- Joy Sparks — chorus vocals (track 12)
- James "Anybody Killa" Lowery — rap vocals (track 14)
- Chris "Blaze Ya Dead Homie" Rouleau — rap vocals (track 14)
- Jamie "Madrox" Spaniolo — rap vocals (track 14)
- The Rude Boy — additional backing vocals
- Tom Baker — mastering
- Dan Miller — keyboards

== Charts ==
| Chart (2003) | Peak position |
|---|---|
| US Heatseekers Albums (Billboard) | 48 |
| US Independent Albums (Billboard) | 31 |
