= The Take =

Take or The Take may refer to:

- Take, a single continuous recorded performance
- Take (hunting), any action that adversely affects a species

== Film ==
- The Take (1974 film) a crime thriller
- Take (film), a 2007 crime thriller
- The Take (2004 film), a documentary about workers reclaiming factories
- The Take (2007 film), a crime drama film
- Bastille Day (2016 film) also released as The Take, an action film starring Idris Elba
- The Take (2027 film), an upcoming film starring Denzel Washington

== Music ==
- The Take (Welsh band), a punk rock band
- Take (band), a South Korean duo
- "The Take" (song), a 2019 song by Canadian singer Tory Lanez
- Take (album), a 2020 album by South Korean rapper Mino
- The Take, a post-punk band from Melbourne, Australia who were part of the Little Band scene
- "Take", a song by Soulsavers from The Light the Dead See
- "Take", a song by the Beths from Straight Line Was a Lie

== Other uses ==
- The Take (YouTube channel), a YouTube channel and media company
- The Take, a 1987 novel by Eugene Izzi
- Take, a 1990 Harpur & Iles novel by Bill James
- The Take, a 2005 novel by Martina Cole
  - The Take (TV series), a 2009 British adaptation of the novel
- Japanese destroyer Take, two ships of the Japanese Navy
- Take or o-take, Japanese bamboo
  - Nickname of Taiwanese baseball player Pan Wu-hsiung
- The Take, a podcast by Al Jazeera, hosted by Malika Bilal

== See also ==
- Taken (disambiguation)
- Acquisition (disambiguation)
- Hot take
