= Stock keeping unit =

A unique alphanumeric code used to track inventory

A rental VHS tape with an SKU barcode viable

SKU code of a product in a database

In inventory management, a stock keeping unit (abbreviated as SKU, pronounced es-kay-YOU or SKEW) is the unit of measure in which the stocks of a material are managed. It is a distinct type of item for sale, purchase, or tracking in inventory, such as a product or service, and all attributes associated with the item type that distinguish it from other item types (for a product, these attributes can include manufacturer, description, material, size, color, packaging, and warranty terms). When a business records the inventory of its stock, it counts the quantity it has of each unit, or SKU.

SKU can also refer to a unique identifier or code, sometimes represented via a barcode for scanning and tracking, which refers to the particular stock keeping unit. These identifiers are not regulated or standardized. When a company receives items from a vendor, it has a choice of maintaining the vendor's SKU or creating its own. This makes them distinct from Global Trade Item Number (GTIN), which are standard, global tracking units. The Universal Product Code (UPC), European Article Number (EAN), and Australian Product Number (APN) are special cases of GTINs.

== Meaning in software ==
SKU is also used in software and software as a service (SaaS), including cloud computing. Cloud service providers such as Google Cloud Platform present different purchasable variations of the product or service as SKUs.

== See also ==
- Part number
- Price look-up code
- Catalog number (commercial products)
- Amazon Standard Identification Number
