= Procuring =

Procuring may refer to:

- Procurement, a business process to acquire goods or services
- Procuring (prostitution), the act of aiding a prostitute in the arrangement of a sex act with a customer

== See also ==
- Procuration
