= Procurement outsourcing =

Transfer of procurement activities

Procurement outsourcing is the transfer of specified key procurement activities relating to sourcing and supplier management to a third party — perhaps to reduce overall costs or maybe to tighten the company's focus on its core competencies. Procurement categorisation and vendor management of indirect materials and services (commonly referred to as Indirect procurement) are typically the most popular outsourced activity.

== Overview ==
Outsourced procurement teams allow companies to benefit immediately from experienced procurement specialists support & expertise. This avoids the creation of an internal team (new resources) and the required time for that team to structure itself, its processes and its expertise.

Outsourced procurement is therefore an available solution for companies who Have no internal competencies but want to quickly benefit from procurement action (Cost reduction, suppliers and contract management... ) - Have internal procurement expertise (department) but want to outsource activity on specific area(s) like indirect materials and services. - Consider Procurement as a non strategic / core function and want to have it managed by a procurement service provider - Want to develop quickly a procurement function to deliver savings, with a willingness to internally develop this function in the mid term

Procurement Outsourcing contributes to automobile manufacturers in India and China— Due to a large increase in number of cars being produced every day, more working hours are required in Trivial Issues (Example: Timely delivery of materials). Therefore the Procurement team may not be able to concentrate on its core competency of negotiations and vendor selections.

== Procurement categories ==
Procurement specialists usually split procurement activities into two parts:

1. Direct procurement. Direct categories are all goods purchased by the company which directly enter into the production process of that company. For the food industry as an example, ingredients and packaging will be the key direct procurement categories.
2. Indirect Procurement. Indirect categories are all the goods and services that are bought by the company to enable its activity. This entails a wide scope, including marketing related services (media buying, agencies), IT related services (hardware, software), HR related services (recruitment agencies, training), facilities management and office services (Telecoms, furniture, cleaning, catering, printers), or utilities (gas, electricity, water)...etc.
