= Chris Benoit double-murder and suicide =

2007 familicide in Fayetteville, Georgia, U.S.

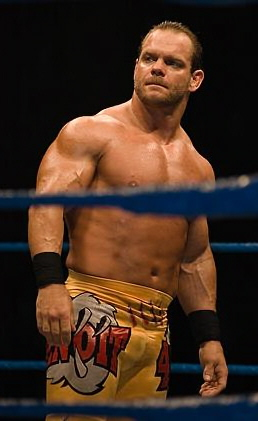
- Benoit in 2006
- Location: 33.393450°N 84.520699°W; Fayetteville, Georgia, U.S.
- Date: June 22—June 24, 2007 (EDT)
- Attack type: Murder–suicide; familicide; uxoricide; filicide
- Weapon: Strangling cord
- Deaths: 3 (including the perpetrator)
- Victims: Nancy Elizabeth Benoit, aged 43; Daniel Christopher Benoit, aged 7
- Perpetrators: Chris Benoit, aged 40
- Motive: Inconclusive
- Accused: Phil Carroll Astin (selling illegal drugs)

Over a three-day period from June 22–24, 2007, Chris Benoit, a 40-year-old Canadian professional wrestler employed by World Wrestling Entertainment (WWE), murdered his wife Nancy and their seven-year-old son, Daniel, before hanging himself at their residence in Fayetteville, Georgia, United States.

Autopsy results showed that Nancy was murdered first, having died of asphyxiation on the night of June 22. Daniel, who also died of asphyxia, was killed as he was lying sedated in his bed on the morning of June 23. On the evening of June 24, Benoit killed himself in his weight room, when he used his lat pulldown machine to hang himself. He placed Bibles near the bodies of Nancy and Daniel.

Since the murders, numerous explanations for Benoit's actions have been proposed, including severe chronic traumatic encephalopathy (CTE), as well as steroid and alcohol abuse, leading to a failing marriage and other personal problems. This led to numerous media accounts, and a federal investigation into steroid abuse in professional wrestling.

== Events ==
=== Murder of Nancy Benoit ===
On Friday, June 22, 2007, Chris Benoit killed his wife Nancy in the bonus room of their house in Fayetteville, Georgia, 22 miles south of Atlanta. According to the police report, Nancy's limbs had been bound prior to her death, with her arms being restrained with coaxial cables and her feet being duct-taped together. A balled-up combination of a tube sock and tape was also found in the kitchen trash and appeared to be soaked in dried blood, which led police to believe that it was being used as a makeshift gag prior to Nancy's death. Injuries indicated that Benoit had pressed a knee into her back while pulling on a cord around her neck, causing strangulation. Her body was found wrapped in a blanket alongside a Bible. Officials said that there were no signs of immediate struggle.

Toxicologists found alcohol in Nancy's body but were unable to determine whether it had been present before death or was a product of decomposition. Decomposition made it difficult to estimate pre-death levels of hydrocodone and alprazolam, which were found in "therapeutic levels" in her body. In any case, the medical examiner saw no evidence that Nancy was as sedated as Daniel had been when he was killed.

=== Murder of Daniel Benoit ===
Daniel Christopher Benoit (February 25, 2000 – June 23, 2007) was Chris's third child. Daniel had two older paternal half-siblings, David and Megan, via Chris's first wife Martina. She and the two older children were living in Canada at the time of the murder–suicide. Daniel was Nancy's only child.

Daniel was suffocated and killed in his bedroom, and another Bible was left by his body. He had internal injuries to the throat area, showing no bruises. His exact time of death is unknown. Toxicology reports determined Daniel was sedated with Xanax and was likely unconscious when he was killed. His body was not as far along as Nancy's body in decomposition.

It was later alleged that Daniel had the genetic disorder fragile X syndrome and that this was the cause of domestic problems within the Benoit family. It was also suggested that track marks on Daniel's arms were the result of human growth hormone (HGH) injections because Benoit considered him undersized due to his condition. Benoit's coworker and close friend, wrestler Chris Jericho, stated that from his own research on the condition, the symptoms "fit Daniel to a tee, all across the board." Concerning those who had publicly stated that they had no knowledge of Daniel having the condition, Jericho said, "If Chris had decided that he wanted to keep it to himself, you wouldn't have been able to pry that out of him with anything." Despite Jericho's initial statements regarding Daniel, he later wrote in his 2011 book Undisputed: "It turned out that Daniel didn't have fragile X, but at the time it made sense because I was grasping at straws." Fayette County District Attorney Scott Ballard later released a statement saying that a source with access to Daniel's medical files found no mention of any pre-existing mental or physical ailments. Likewise, his teachers reported that he was on par with other students and not about to be held back academically as previously thought. In 2016, speaking publicly for the first time on the Talk is Jericho podcast, Nancy's sister, Sandra Toffoloni, unequivocally denied any claims that Daniel had ever had fragile X or any similar condition.

=== After the murders ===
At about 3:30 p.m. EDT on Saturday, June 23, 2007, fellow wrestler and close friend Chavo Guerrero received a voicemail message from Benoit's phone stating that both Nancy and Daniel had food poisoning and he would be late for that night's house show in Beaumont, Texas. Guerrero called Benoit back and found that he sounded tired and groggy as he confirmed everything that he had said in his voice message. Guerrero, who grew "concerned about Benoit's tone and demeanor", called him back twelve minutes later. Benoit did not answer, and Guerrero left a voicemail message asking Benoit to call him back.

At 3:44 p.m. EDT, Benoit called Guerrero back, stating that he had not answered the call because he was on the phone with Delta Air Lines, changing his flight. He stated that he had a stressful day due to Nancy and Daniel's purported food poisoning. Guerrero then replied with, "All right man, if you need to talk, I'm here for you." Benoit ended the conversation by saying, "Chavo, I love you." During a 2014 appearance on the Talk is Jericho podcast, Guerrero said Benoit sounded "off" when he talked to him, especially when he said "I love you" with emphasis. Another co-worker who often travelled with Benoit called him from outside George Bush Intercontinental Airport in Houston. Benoit answered and told the co-worker that Nancy was vomiting blood and that Daniel was also vomiting. Benoit failed to show up for the house show in Beaumont and left a voicemail on Guerrero's cellphone that he would be on a flight that would arrive in Houston at 8 a.m. CDT on the following Sunday morning. During this time, Benoit called and left a voicemail for an unknown friend.

On Sunday, June 24, five text messages were sent to co-workers between 3:51 a.m. and 3:58 a.m. using both Chris' and Nancy's cellphones. Four of them displayed the Benoits' home address. The fifth said that the family's dogs were in an enclosed pool area and that a garage side door had been left open. Guerrero and WWE referee Scott Armstrong were two of the recipients of these texts. Guerrero was woken up by the texts and went back to sleep, reasoning that he would ask Benoit about the texts when he picked him up at Houston airport in a few hours. Benoit did not board the flight to Houston that landed at 8 a.m.

Late that morning, Benoit called WWE's talent relations office, stating that Daniel was vomiting and that he and Nancy were at the hospital with him. He stated that he would be taking a later flight into Houston, where he was scheduled to face CM Punk for the vacant ECW World Championship at the Vengeance: Night of Champions pay-per-view event that night. Benoit failed to appear for the event.

=== Suicide of Chris Benoit ===
According to Ballard and the Fayette County Sheriff's Office, Benoit's death was a suicide by hanging. He removed the bar from a lat pulldown machine in his exercise room and fastened the end of a cord from the machine into a noose. He then released the weights, causing his strangulation. Ballard said Benoit was found hanging from the pulley cable.

On the 2016 Talk is Jericho podcast, Toffoloni claimed that over the weekend, the search history on Benoit's computer showed he had researched "the quickest and easiest way to break a neck." Benoit had then later used a towel around his neck attached to the handle of the machine, which he pulled down using a very heavy weight and let go, breaking his neck instantly. However, the police report done by the Fayette County Sheriff's Office states he showed no damage to his neck area other than that which came from the cable around his neck. It also states the only topic he researched on his computer during that time period was the biblical prophet Elijah's resurrection of a dead child. No mention of the claims made by Toffoloni were present in the police report, and his autopsy report made no mention of damage to Benoit's cervical vertebrae, hyoid bone, trachea or larynx area, further indicating he did not snap his neck as a manner of suicide.

=== Discovery of the bodies ===
On Monday, June 25, 2007, WWE wrestlers and executives arrived in Corpus Christi for Monday Night Raw, which was to take place at the American Bank Center. As the early hours of the afternoon progressed and the show became closer to starting, WWE executives were increasingly concerned that they had not heard from Benoit in over 24 hours. Guerrero then showed WWE Vice President of Talent Relations John Laurinaitis (a.k.a. Johnny Ace) the text messages that he and Armstrong had received from Chris and Nancy's cellphones in the early hours of Sunday. As more time progressed without any contact from Benoit, WWE called the Fayetteville Police Department and asked for a welfare check at the Benoit household. After discovering the bodies, Fayetteville police called WWE around 4:15 p.m. (CDT) and informed them that they had discovered three bodies at the Benoit home and that the house was now considered a "major crime scene".

A suicide note was not discovered during the initial investigation. One was later discovered in a Bible that had been among Benoit's possessions that were sent to his first wife and their two children in Canada. Benoit's father Michael stated that Chris had left "a hand-written notation in there saying, 'I'm preparing to leave this Earth.'" During a 2020 interview with Chris Van Vliet, Benoit's eldest son David stated that he did not leave a suicide note and showed no indication that anything was wrong in their last conversations prior to the tragedy. David stated that Benoit had planned for him to visit from Canada the week following the murders.

== Memorial and cremation ==
A memorial for Nancy and Daniel took place in Daytona Beach, Florida, on July 14, 2007. Both were cremated and their ashes placed in starfish-shaped urns for Nancy's family. Benoit was also cremated, following a private memorial service in Ardrossan, Alberta, on August 6, 2007. The fate of his ashes has not been publicly disclosed.

== Possible motives ==
Neuroscientist and former wrestler Christopher Nowinski argued that Benoit may have been suffering from repeated, untreated concussions throughout his life, ultimately leading to an unstable mental state. Nowinski stated that Benoit "was one of the only guys who would take a chair shot to the back of the head ... which is stupid." Tests conducted on Benoit's brain by Julian Bailes, the head of neurosurgery at West Virginia University (WVU), showed "Benoit's brain was so severely damaged it resembled the brain of an 85-year-old Alzheimer's patient." Bennet Omalu and others suggested that Benoit's brain was damaged enough that he likely would not have lived for more than a few years after 2007, regardless of his actions.

The four lobes of the human brain, and the brain stem, seen in black

Other tests conducted on Benoit's brain tissue revealed severe chronic traumatic encephalopathy (CTE), and damage to all four lobes of the brain and brain stem. Bailes and his colleagues concluded that repeated concussions can lead to dementia, which can contribute to severe behavioural problems. Benoit's father said that brain damage may have been the primary cause of the murder–suicide. A statement released by WWE described the findings as "speculative."

Nancy had filed for divorce from Benoit in May 2003, alleging domestic abuse, but withdrew the filing three months later. In February 2008, The Atlanta Journal-Constitution (AJC) reported that Nancy may have suspected Benoit of having an affair with a female WWE wrestler, and that they may have also argued over a life insurance policy. The AJC claimed their source was a recently released report from the Fayette County Sheriff's Office.

=== Steroids ===
Steroids were found in the Benoit household, leading some media organizations to hypothesize that a steroid-induced rage may have been the cause of Benoit's actions, as some doctors have linked steroid use to uncontrollable anger, among other psychological issues, including paranoia. WWE released a press statement challenging the "roid rage" claims. One part of the statement reads:

"The physical findings announced by authorities indicate deliberation, not rage. The wife's feet and hands were bound and she was asphyxiated, not beaten to death. By the account of the authorities, there were substantial periods of time between the death of the wife and the death of the son, again suggesting deliberate thought, not rage. The presence of a Bible by each is also not an act of rage."

Prosecutors in New York investigated the deliveries Benoit received from Signature Pharmacy and MedXLife.com, which sold steroids and HGH over the internet. Terence Kindlon, the lawyer for MedXLife co-owner Gary Brandwein, denied allegations that his client's company sold steroids to Benoit. Brandwein pleaded not guilty to six counts of criminal sale of a controlled substance in New York state court.

According to a report from Sports Illustrated, three packages sent to Benoit were from Signature Pharmacy, with the first one sent in December 2005 to San Antonio, Texas. The second package was sent on February 13, 2006, to an address in Peachtree City, Georgia, and the third was sent in July 2006 to Fort Walton Beach, Florida. This followed eleven wrestlers that were named in a Sports Illustrated steroids investigation that began in March 2007, which included Angle, Eddie Guerrero, Oscar Guttierez (a.k.a. Rey Mysterio, Jr.), Adam Copeland (a.k.a. Edge) and Gregory Helms, with Copeland receiving a high amount of steroids.

WWE attorney Jerry McDevitt stated that "they believe the facts of this crime do not support the hypothesis that 'roid rage' played a role in the murders", citing evidence of premeditation in addition to the lack of a toxicology report, and the fact that the steroids found within Benoit's home were legally prescribed. Gary I. Wadler, a former official in the World Anti-Doping Agency, agreed with McDevitt's statement, saying that it was "a premeditated act and that's not rage". Investigators seized both Benoit and Nancy's medical records, as well as records belonging to Mark Jindrak, Hardcore Holly (Robert Howard), Lex Luger, Rey Mysterio, Jr., Buff Bagwell (Marcus Bagwell) and Johnny Grunge (Mike Durham), all of whom were patients of Benoit's doctor, Phil Astin.

=== Chronic traumatic encephalopathy ===
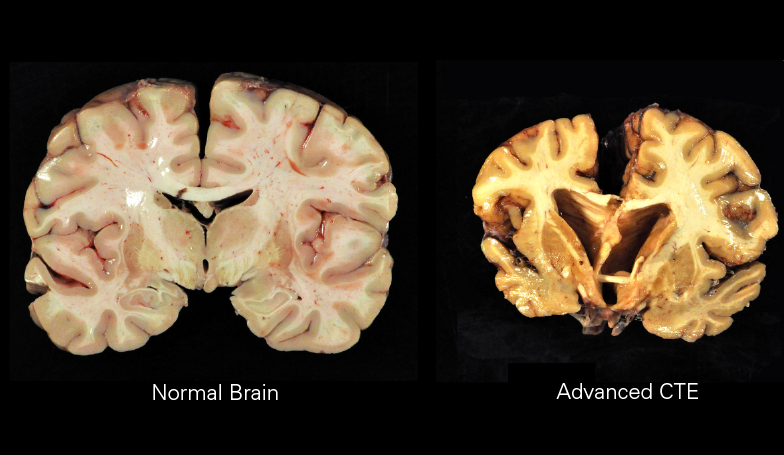
A healthy human brain compared with one damaged by CTE; this damaged brain is not necessarily the size of Benoit's at the time of his death

At the time of the Benoit murder–suicide, research was being led by Bennet Omalu into CTE in former players of gridiron football. The issue came to the forefront following Omalu's 2002 report on former Pittsburgh Steelers center and Pro Football Hall of Fame member Mike Webster after the player's death. Subsequent postmortem analyses of the brains of recently deceased National Football League (NFL) players agreed with the report on Webster's death, as each player showed the kind of brain damage previously seen in people with Alzheimer's disease or dementia, as well as in some retired boxers.

Christopher Nowinski, a former WWE wrestler who had written the 2006 book Head Games: Football's Concussion Crisis, was active in investigating the CTE diagnoses of former NFL players Andre Waters and Justin Strzelczyk, and discussed concerns of concussions after being contacted by Ted Johnson. On June 28, 2007, four days after Benoit's death, his father Michael agreed to Nowinski's offer to have his son's brain analysed by the same neurosurgeons. On September 5, 2007, Julian Bailes, the chief of neurosurgery at WVU, held a news conference in New York City to announce the results of Benoit's postmortem brain examination.

"When the (Sports Legacy Institute) approached Michael Benoit about testing Chris' brain as part of the Sports Legacy Project, our goal was to determine if there was evidence of CTE caused by repeated trauma to the head sustained during Chris Benoit's career. We have now confirmed multiple concussions are part of his medical history, along with clinical symptoms associated with CTE. Because my SLI colleagues and I have found evidence of CTE in the brains of four former professional football players, we felt an examination of Chris Benoit's brain may bring awareness to CTE's existence outside of boxers and football players. The findings of CTE in Chris Benoit suggest that there may be a common syndrome among athletes who suffer multiple head injuries in contact sports."

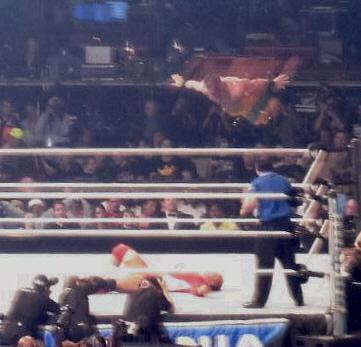
Benoit performing a diving headbutt finisher on Montel Vontavious Porter at WrestleMania 23 on April 1, 2007

In December 2009, nearly 30 months after Benoit's death, Omalu confirmed to ESPN's Outside the Lines that the death of a second WWE wrestler, Andrew Martin (a.k.a. Test), was attributed to CTE. Bailes told ESPN, "When we announced our findings about Chris, some in the media said it was 'roid rage. We said at the time the real finding was that repeated head trauma was the cause. With Andrew Martin as the second case, the WWE and the sport in general have to ask themselves, 'Is this a trend?' The science tells us that jumping off ten-foot ladders and slamming people with tables and chairs is simply bad for the brain."

WWE noted the research was new at the time but released the following statement to ESPN:

"While this is a new emerging science, the WWE is unaware of the veracity of any of these tests, be it for Chris Benoit or Andrew Martin. Dr. Omalu claims that Mr. Benoit had a brain that resembled an 85-year-old with Alzheimer's, which would lead one to ponder how Mr. Benoit would have found his way to an airport, let alone been able to remember all the moves and information that is required to perform in the ring."

In the decade following the broadcast, postmortem brain research on numerous deceased wrestlers diagnosed findings consistent with CTE. Wrestlers diagnosed in postmortem research include Axl Rotten, Balls Mahoney, Jimmy Snuka, Harry Fujiwara and Ron Bass.

In 2013, the NFL and groups representing 18,000 former players agreed to a $765 million settlement compensating players in regards to head injuries, specifically concussions. Influenced by the NFL decision, over 60 professional wrestlers and representatives of deceased wrestlers, joined by attorney Konstantine Kyros, filed a class-action lawsuit against WWE. The litigation claims the company concealed the risks of injury in wrestling, specifically CTE. United States District Judge Vanessa Lynne Bryant dismissed the lawsuits in September 2018, saying the Benoit tragedy did not cause WWE to recognize a link between CTE and wrestling but stated: "The circumstances surrounding Mr. Benoit's death were so tragic and so horrifying that it would have been reasonable for his fellow wrestlers to follow news developments about him and about CTE, through which they could have deduced that they were at risk of developing CTE and sought medical opinions about risks to their own health." The United States Court of Appeals for the Second Circuit rejected an appeal in September 2020 and the United States Supreme Court declined to hear the case in April 2021.

In 2025, Chris Jericho interviewed Nowinski for his Talk Is Jericho podcast. He noted the Boston University CTE Center and Brain Bank researched the 2021 Phillip Adams murder-suicide and found similar connections to Benoit, and examined the Parkinson's disease symptoms of former professional wrestler Dean Malenko; both situations were linked to head injuries. Nowinski also noted WWE did not agree with the research into CTE at the time of his research into Benoit. Modern wrestling has since added concussion protocols to ensure wrestlers are not re-entering the ring too early after an incident.

== Responses ==
=== World Wrestling Entertainment ===
Good evening. Tonight, this arena here in Corpus Christi, Texas, was to have been filled to capacity with enthusiastic WWE fans. Tonight's storyline was to have been the alleged demise of my character, Mr. McMahon. However, in reality, WWE Superstar Chris Benoit, his wife Nancy, and their son Daniel, are dead. Their bodies were discovered this afternoon in their new, suburban Atlanta home. The authorities are undergoing an investigation. We here in the WWE can only offer our condolences to the extended family of Chris Benoit, and the only other thing we can do at this moment is, tonight, pay tribute to Chris Benoit. We will offer you some of the most memorable moments in Chris' professional life, and you will hear, tonight, comments from his peers; those here – his fellow performers – those here who loved Chris and admired him so much. So tonight will be a three-hour tribute to one of the greatest WWE superstars of all time. Tonight will be a tribute to Chris Benoit.

— Vince McMahon opening Monday Night RAW in Corpus Christi, Texas, to inform the viewers of the Benoit family tragedy.

The deaths at the Benoit household were first reported to fans of WWE via the company's Mobile Alerts Service, and posted to its official website soon after. On its corporate website, the company released the following statement:

"World Wrestling Entertainment was informed today by authorities in Fayette County, Ga., that WWE Superstar Chris Benoit, his wife, Nancy, and his son were found dead in their home. Authorities are investigating, but no other details are available at this time.

Instead of its announced programming for tonight on USA Network, WWE will air a three-hour tribute to Chris Benoit. Chris was beloved among his fellow Superstars, and was a favorite among WWE fans for his unbelievable athleticism and wrestling ability. He always took great pride in his performance, and always showed respect for the business he loved, for his peers and towards his fans. This is a terrible tragedy and an unbearable loss.

WWE extends its sincere condolences and prayers to the surviving members of the Benoit family and their loved ones in this time of tragedy."

After WWE promoter Vince McMahon had gathered the wrestlers together to tell them that the Benoit family were all deceased, the company cancelled the three-hour-long Monday Night Raw live show that had been scheduled for a few hours later at the American Bank Center. Coincidentally, the show was supposed to be a memorial for the Mr. McMahon character, who on the June 11 episode of Monday Night Raw "died" in a limo explosion, with the remainder of the ensuing angle cancelled entirely. WWE replaced the broadcast version with a tribute to Benoit's life and career, featuring past matches, segments from the Hard Knocks: The Chris Benoit Story DVD and comments from wrestlers and announcers from WWE's Raw, SmackDown and ECW brands. Shortly after the program aired, many of the aired comments were posted on WWE.com. It was not until the last hour of the tribute program that successive reports surfaced that Chris, Nancy and Daniel had all died on different days over the weekend, and that the police were not looking for any other suspects in the deaths.

The following night, Tuesday, June 26, after details of the murder–suicide became available, WWE aired a recorded statement by McMahon before its ECW broadcast:

Good evening, ladies and gentlemen. Last night on Monday Night Raw, the WWE presented a special tribute show, recognizing the career of Chris Benoit. However, now some 26 hours later, the facts of this horrific tragedy are now apparent. Therefore, other than my comments, there will be no mention of Mr. Benoit's name tonight. On the contrary, tonight's show will be dedicated to everyone who has been affected by this terrible incident. This evening marks the first step of the healing process. Tonight, WWE performers will do what they do better than anyone else in the world: entertain you.

On Friday, June 29, before that week's edition of SmackDown, McMahon released another statement indicating that the related events of the tragedy were not known to WWE at the time. The rest of the statement remained the same as the first one.

On a recent edition of Raw, the WWE presented a special tribute show, recognizing the career of Chris Benoit. However, the facts of this horrific tragedy involving Chris Benoit were not known at the time. Therefore, other than my comments, there will be no mention of Mr. Benoit's name in this program. On the contrary, this show is dedicated to everyone who has been affected by this terrible incident. This marks the first step of the healing process whereby WWE performers will now do what they do better than anyone else in the world: entertain you.

After learning about the full details of the murder–suicide, WWE quickly distanced itself from Benoit:

- Except for his results and listings in WWE's title history (though the summaries of his title reigns have been removed), and select press releases from WWE's corporate subsite, the WWE website removed all past mentions of Benoit, including all news articles relating to the specific details of the incident, as well as his biography and the video tribute comments from Benoit's peers.
- WWE pulled the tribute episode from international markets that aired Monday Night Raw on a tape-delay basis. Several channels announced the episode was being withheld for legal reasons. A substitute Raw, hosted by Todd Grisham from WWE Studios, was created featuring recaps of WWE Championship and World Heavyweight Championship matches that had occurred over the past year.
- Benoit's name was removed from his previous theme song "Rabid" on the MP3 release of WWE Anthology.
- Benoit, along with his "Crippler Crossface" and other signature moves, were removed from the WWE SmackDown vs. Raw 2008 video game, after Benoit was originally included in the game as a playable character. Starting with WWE SmackDown vs Raw 2010, the move was reinstated as "Crossface".
- WWE Classics On Demand, WWE's subscription video on demand service, began removing the likeness and mentions of both Benoit and Nancy from archival footage.
- Matches and other footage involving Benoit appeared very sparingly on WWE DVD releases following his death, with all of them being footage involving multiple wrestlers, such as a battle royal or a multiple-person tag team match. The WCW WarGames DVD by WWE, which features all of the WarGames matches, does include the 1997 WCW Fall Brawl WarGames match between the nWo and the Four Horsemen, featuring Benoit, who was not involved in the finish of the match, but has commentary about Benoit edited out.
- The WWE Network shows the June 25, 2007, internationally aired episode of Raw featuring several world title matches instead of the original Benoit tribute show. The opening promo for the June 26, 2007, ECW episode with McMahon, mentioning Benoit, has been omitted from the broadcast. Several pay-per-view posters that featured Benoit were replaced with new artwork on the network's menu screen. Matches listed for shows and pay-per-views that have Benoit in them do not mention him by name but instead list his opponent(s) and stipulation. Additionally, entering Benoit's name into the network's search function will return no results.
- In 2015, Benoit's name was finally mentioned as part of the WWE Network's Monday Night Wars series about the fall of WCW. This marked the first time since June 2007 that WWE mentioned Benoit by name. A segment in this series talked about the 2000 Invasion storyline with Benoit and his Radicalz stablemates Eddie Guerrero, Dean Malenko and Perry Saturn. However, barring an establishing shot, Benoit was omitted from all footage and photographs featuring the group.
- Canadian rock band Our Lady Peace, who had written Benoit's entrance song "Whatever" in 2001, were asked if they would ever perform the song again in a 2012 interview with The Huffington Post. Band members Raine Maida and Steve Mazur responded that they felt they could not, given the circumstances of Benoit's death. However, they ultimately would play the song again at a concert in February 2025, almost 18 years after the murder-suicide.
- WWE included the moment when Randy Orton pinned Benoit at SummerSlam 2004 to capture his first World Heavyweight Championship in a promotional video for the match between Orton and John Cena at TLC 2013. However, Benoit's face cannot be seen. This was also done in videos for the buildup to Orton's fourteenth world championship win against Drew McIntyre in 2020.
- In Kurt Angle's WWE Hall of Fame video upon his induction in 2017, WWE briefly showed a clip of his match with Benoit. However, the shot is distant and Benoit's face cannot be seen.
- On a 2020 episode of Raw after SummerSlam emanating from WWE's ThunderDome, a fan showed an image of Benoit in a prominently featured position during a segment with Drew McIntyre. This was apparently the last picture of Benoit taken before his death.

=== Professional wrestling industry ===
Numerous individuals in professional wrestling, past and present, commented on the deaths and their aftermath:

- Hulk Hogan commented on Benoit's personality and his thoughts on the crime, saying: "He was peaceful and kept to himself ... I think it had to be something personal, a domestic problem between him and his wife."
- Bret Hart also commented on Benoit's personality, stating: "I never saw him lose his temper or act strange or weird. I don't remember Chris as being a guy who took a lot of pills or drank too hard. I think you'll find over the next few weeks this steroid thing was played up too much."
- Kurt Angle chose to comment more on the reaction to the crime, stating, "This is not WWE's fault, and this is not Vince McMahon's fault. Chris Benoit was responsible for his own actions."
- Eric Bischoff discussed the media reaction, saying: "It's clear that the media wants to blame steroids, professional wrestling, Vince McMahon or anyone or anything else that further sensationalizes this family tragedy. I refuse to join the choir. I don't have enough information. I wasn't there. I am not a psychiatrist. I just can't imagine how or why this could have happened."
- Lex Luger commented on the situation, saying that he was "shocked and saddened" to learn of Benoit's death. He also believed that steroids may have affected the situation, stating: "Obviously, they were in his home. Let's face it. There's a pretty good chance he was on them and to discount that they didn't play a role, as far as with his temperament, I'd be lying if I said there wasn't that possibility."
- Other wrestlers also commented, including The Rock, Marc Mero, Ted DiBiase Sr., Randy Orton, Kevin Nash, Lance Storm, Chyna, Steve Blackman, Rob Van Dam, Ultimate Warrior, New Jack, John Cena, Chris Jericho, and William Regal. Vince McMahon and his wife Linda, then WWE's CEO, were interviewed (separate and jointly) by various news outlets. Some wrestlers, such as "Dr. Death" Steve Williams, wrote posts on their websites and social media pages.
- CM Punk, who was scheduled to face Benoit at the Vengeance: Night of Champions pay-per-view the night he died, was among the many WWE personnel that commented on Benoit during the three-hour tribute show on Raw. He also briefly touched on the subject of the murder–suicide in a 2011 interview with GQ. He described the Benoit incident as "a pretty ... low point in everyone's life. A lot of people don't like to talk about it. It still blows my mind." At the 2012 San Diego Comic-Con during an interview session with wrestlers including Punk, he was asked if WWE was trying to erase Benoit from history. Punk responded that while Benoit is in the history books and that cannot be changed, it does not make any sense for WWE to further promote him due to "the horrific nature of what he did".
- Sean Waltman, in a 2014 interview, said of Benoit: "He was a pleasant guy, but always had a darkness about him ... a sadness, or something." Waltman added that Benoit had a bleak sense of humour, finding amusement in "things that were a little bit bent."
- Paul Heyman, in a 2019 interview with Inside the Ropes, briefly mentioned Benoit during an interview focused on Brock Lesnar after a fan kept interrupting whenever Heyman mentioned Benoit's name, and said: "Three people died in that house that night, and only one person [Benoit] had the choice behind it, as the other two [Nancy and Daniel] didn't have a choice to die." Heyman also stated that he does not care whether CTE was behind Benoit's actions, and while forever respecting Benoit as a performer, he had lost any and all respect for him personally following the incident.
- Dave Penzer, who was a close friend, neighbor and colleague of Benoit and Nancy, said in a 2017 interview that Benoit was a "nice guy, great talent" but noted there was always something off about him. He called Nancy a great friend, but described her as a "rough" person who "could go at it too." In regards to the incident, he noted that when he heard about the deaths, he didn't have a doubt in his mind it was a double murder-suicide, with either parent capable of killing the other based on the back-and-forth dysfunction between the couple. He elaborated that the Benoits were prone to awkward fights in public, and their dysfunction worsened in 2006 after the fatal overdose of their close friend Johnny Grunge. Penzer stated that Grunge had been able to help the couple with their issues in the past and was the couple's "go-to" outlet when discussing their marriage problems. Following his passing, the couple became increasingly private, barely spoke to their group of friends and moved to a different house without telling anyone. Penzer states that he believes that if Grunge were alive, he could have helped Benoit and his wife, thus preventing the tragedy.
- Stone Cold Steve Austin said in his podcast in 2013, "Chris Benoit as the person I knew, loved him. Chris Benoit as a wrestler, loved him. Chris Benoit as the person who did what he did, unforgivable. Bottom line." Austin also spoke about Benoit's personality and work ethic: "Well first and foremost, what I think about Chris Benoit is that guy was one of the most nicest guys I ever met in my life. He's one of the most talented, hardworking cats I'd ever seen in the squared circle. Anybody who knew Chris would tell you those exact two things. That guy loved the damn wrestling business, he was born to be a wrestler and was absolutely phenomenal. Drawing a lot of his influence from The Dynamite Kid, he blazed a path as the Pegasus Kid and his legacy as The Crippler Chris Benoit was just one hellacious career."
- John Cena said in 2017 that the way WWE handled the situation sets "a precedent in athletics and entertainment of taking ownership for [one's] actions."

=== Media ===
When the news broke about Benoit's death, most mainstream news outlets covered the story, including MSNBC and Fox News. The Benoit incident made the cover of People magazine. ECW Press (which has no affiliation with Extreme Championship Wrestling, a promotion for which Benoit once worked, though their initials are the same) announced on July 16 that noted wrestling writer Irvin Muchnick had written a book on the case, due out in 2008. At the Comedy Central Roast of Flavor Flav in August 2007, Jimmy Kimmel joked to honoree Flavor Flav that "Chris Benoit is a better father than Flavor Flav," which drew a shocked response and laughs from the crowd. The show aired less than two months after the incident, but no reference was made to the taping date of the episode in question.

In 2015, wrestling journalist Bill Apter speculated the murders were a professional hit.

=== Government ===
With Benoit and his death allegedly linked to steroid abuse, WWE underwent investigation by the United States House Committee on Oversight and Government Reform regarding their talent wellness policy. Congress did not take action against either WWE or any other professional wrestling company in the wake of the event.

In January 2009, Henry Waxman, outgoing chairman of the House Committee on Oversight and Government Reform, requested that the Office of National Drug Control Policy chief, John P. Walters, "examine steroid use in professional wrestling and take appropriate steps to address this problem." In the letter, Waxman stated, "In the first year of WWE's testing program, which began in March 2006, 40% of wrestlers tested positive for steroids and other drugs, even after being warned in advance that they were going to be tested." He also wrote that wrestlers who tested positive for performance enhancers received light punishment and afterwards could often participate in wrestling events. The committee investigation also uncovered how easily wrestlers could secure "therapeutic use exemptions" (TUEs, permission to take banned substances for medical reasons) so they could continue performing while using steroids. When Waxman's staff interviewed Tracy Ray, a physician contracted by WWE, Ray claimed there was "shadiness in almost every [TUE] case that I've reviewed."

=== Toxicology results ===
At the press conference held by the Georgia Bureau of Investigation (GBI) on July 17, 2007, it was announced that three different drugs were found in Nancy's system: hydromorphone, hydrocodone and Xanax. All three drugs were found to be at levels investigators considered normal for therapeutic treatment, as opposed to recreational use or abuse. A blood-alcohol level was found to be 0.184. Kris Sperry, the medical examiner, added it was impossible to say whether any of the blood findings were due to ingestion of alcohol or the post-mortem process. It was also ruled out that Nancy was sedated by Benoit before she was murdered.

Xanax was found in Daniel's system. District Attorney Ballard noted this was not a drug that would be given to a child under normal circumstances. It was believed that Daniel was sedated before being murdered, with Sperry ruling out that he had died of a drug overdose. The GBI, however, said in the press conference that it could not perform tests for steroids or HGH on Daniel because of a lack of urine.

Xanax and hydrocodone were found in Chris Benoit's system, at levels investigators called consistent with therapeutic use. Elevated levels of the synthetic anabolic steroid testosterone cypionate were found in his urine; investigators believed that the level found suggested it had been taken recently. While testosterone cypionate was found in his urine, there was no evidence of gamma hydroxybutyrate contrary to speculation. Benoit tested negative for blood alcohol.

=== Drug charges against Benoit's doctor ===
Phil Astin's attorney, Manny Arora, asked a judge to throw out evidence seized during a raid on Astin's office after the murder–suicide. He claimed the search exceeded authority granted in a search warrant and that police seized other patients' records and three years of bank and computer records. In February 2008, Astin was charged with overprescribing medication in a case not connected to Benoit. On January 29, 2009, Astin admitted he illegally prescribed drugs, sometimes without examining the patients first, and pleaded guilty to all 175 counts against him. He was sentenced to ten years in prison.

== Wikipedia controversy ==
A statement regarding Nancy's death was added to the Chris Benoit English Wikipedia article 14 hours before police discovered the bodies of Benoit and his family. This seemingly prescient addition was initially reported on Wikinews and later on Fox News. The article originally read: "Chris Benoit was replaced by Johnny Nitro for the ECW World Championship match at Vengeance, as Benoit was not there due to personal issues, stemming from the death of his wife Nancy."

The phrase "stemming from the death of his wife Nancy" was added at 4:01 a.m. EDT on June 25, whereas the Fayette County police reportedly discovered the bodies of the Benoit family at 2:30 p.m. EDT, 10 hours, 29 minutes later. The IP address of the editor was traced to Stamford, Connecticut, which at the time was the location of the WWE headquarters. After news of the early death notice reached mainstream media, the anonymous poster accessed Wikinews to explain his edit as a "huge coincidence and nothing more."

The poster responsible for the edit was later identified as Matthew Greenberg, a then 19-year-old student at the University of Connecticut in Storrs. Detectives "seized computer equipment from the man held responsible for the postings" and called the posting an "unbelievable hindrance" to their investigation, but believed Greenberg was otherwise uninvolved, declining to press charges. Greenberg had found several rumors online, which supported his theory about the Benoit "family emergency" as reported in wrestling news. The IP from which he made the edit was tentatively traced to vandalizing other Wikipedia entries.

== Aftermath and legacy ==
In the years following the murder–suicide, it continued to be referred to in the media. The Great American Bash pay-per-view on July 20, 2008, was the last WWE pay-per-view with a TV-14 rating. WWE immediately thereafter adopted a TV-PG rating, which resulted in a noticeable toning down of edgy content in its broadcasts. Within a few months, blood was severely toned down, which returned WWE's product to its pre-1997 rule on prohibiting deliberate blading in matches.

The removal of Benoit from WWE media was extensive, with the organization immediately opting to remove any and all references to the wrestler in all of their media. This included significant matches with Benoit's involvement, from pay-per-views including main events. In recent years, WWE has softened its policy, and matches he participated in began to appear on the WWE Network not long after its launch. Despite this, Benoit's name would not appear in any descriptions of the event and searching with his name would yield no results. WWE has also mentioned his name in lists regarding the lineages of titles that he also held, though with no links or biographical information present for Benoit's reigns.

WWE took similar actions with other wrestlers in later years, notably with Jimmy Snuka for his 2015 arrest regarding the death of Nancy Argentino, and Hulk Hogan following the release of a tape that included Hogan making racist comments (see Bollea v. Gawker). As both men were members of the WWE Hall of Fame, the company removed them from the hall. Journalists and fans compared their removals to the scale of Benoit's. Snuka and Hogan eventually had the actions reversed and both were reinstated into the hall, with Hogan being inducted a second time for his work with the New World Order (nWo) in 2020.

There have been discussions about whether or not Benoit himself would ever be inducted into the WWE Hall of Fame. Steve Austin predicted that Benoit, although important to the business, would never be inducted due to his actions. Jericho also stated that Benoit should never be in the hall. Benoit's eldest son David, however, believes that his father someday will be inducted. Vickie Guerrero, widow of Benoit's best friend and Hall of Famer Eddie Guerrero, has also approved of Benoit being inducted into the hall. Some journalists, fans and wrestlers, including Hall of Famer Mick Foley, have advocated for the inclusion of Nancy into the Hall of Fame for her work in WCW and ECW as a valet and manager.

- In July 2012, the rap group Insane Clown Posse released a music video for the song "Chris Benoit". The song and music video, however, are not about Benoit himself, but a man's breakdown that is similar to Benoit's. The song and music video include stock footage and a recording of Benoit before his death. A remix with rappers Ice Cube and Scarface was later released, with Ice Cube's verse being entirely about Benoit.
- In a July 2013 interview, Benoit's sister-in-law Sandra Toffoloni stated her belief that a blackout caused him to murder Nancy. She stated that the medical examiner who examined Benoit's body stated he had only ten more months to live due to an enlarged heart. Toffoloni also stated that Benoit was contemplating retiring and opening a wrestling school, but decided to continue wrestling due to being in one of the main events at the Vengeance: Night of Champions event.
- A biopic titled Crossface was announced in 2011, which would have been based on Matthew Randazzo's book Ring of Hell: The Story of Chris Benoit and the Fall of the Pro Wrestling Industry. The film would have shown Benoit, from his early days being trained by the Hart family, to his rise with ECW, WCW and WWE, to the murder–suicide. Liev Schreiber was set to portray Benoit. Filming was set to begin in 2012; however, according to Benoit's eldest son David, the film was cancelled following a legal dispute with the Benoit family.
- In March 2020, Vice's Dark Side of the Ring released a two-hour documentary episode about the incident featuring family (his son David and Sandra Toffoloni) and close friends in the wrestling industry (Chavo Guerrero Jr., Vickie Guerrero, Jim Ross, Dean Malenko, and Chris Jericho).
- After serving a decade in prison, Phil Carroll Astin died at the age of 67 on June 24, 2022.

== See also ==
- List of premature professional wrestling deaths
- List of murdered American children
- Judith Barsi, American child actress was killed by her father on a similar double-murder and suicide
- Killing of the Clancy children, a similar multi-murder and attempted suicide committed by their mother.
