= Census taker =

Census taker may refer to:

- Someone who collects census data by visiting individual homes
- The Census Taker, a 1984 movie
  - Census Taker, the soundtrack to the 1984 movie by The Residents
- The Census Taker Problem, a logical puzzle in number theory

== See also ==
- This Census-Taker, a 2016 novella by China Miéville
