= The Mighty Death Pop! =

Studio album by Insane Clown Posse
- Released: August 14, 2012
- Recorded: 2010–12
- Genres: Horrorcore; Detroit techno; dark ambient
- Length: 63:14
- Label: Psychopathic
- Producers: Mike E. Clark; DJ Clay

Insane Clown Posse chronology
Bang! Pow! Boom! (2009)	The Mighty Death Pop! (2012)	The Marvelous Missing Link: Lost (2015)

Singles from The Mighty Death Pop!
- 1. "Chris Benoit" Released: July 26, 2012; 2. "Night of the Chainsaw" Released: October 26, 2012; 3. "Hate Her to Death" Released: February 4, 2013; 4. "Where's God" Released: March 22, 2013; 5. "When I'm Clownin'" Released: July 23, 2013; 6. "The Mighty Death Pop" Released: August 30, 2013; 7. "Forever" Released: July 22, 2014

The Mighty Death Pop! is the twelfth studio album by underground American hip-hop group Insane Clown Posse, released on August 14, 2012. It is their second album to focus on the Dark Carnival since the conclusion of the group's original "Joker's Cards" series. The title character is the second in a set of six new Joker's Cards. It is the group's 29th overall release, and is the last album to date to feature long-time producer Mike E. Clark.

== Background ==
At their 2010 Hallowicked concert, Insane Clown Posse revealed the first face of The Mighty Death Pop character, and stated that the album would be the second in a new deck of Joker's Cards. The following March, they announced that the album would have two faces. The second face was revealed to have the likeness of an exploding clown skull, as a representation of the character after it "pops".

Since the release of Bang! Pow! Boom, Joseph Bruce and Joseph Utsler have accumulated various song topics and beats and traveled to producer Mike E. Clark's studio in northern Michigan to record the new album. Insane Clown Posse focused on recording. Bruce has stated that he expected that the new album would take quite a bit of time to record, saying it's "just gonna take a lot of time. There's so much that needs to be recorded. It's definitely a job, a lot of work. But I'm excited, I'm not bitching."

As opposed to Bang! Pow! Boom!, which did not contain any guest appearances, Insane Clown Posse wanted to feature guest appearances on The Mighty Death Pop!, as they had done with The Amazing Jeckel Brothers. Among their first choices to appear were Tech N9ne and Hopsin. DJ Clay is also found in the outtakes section of The Mighty Death Pop! Following their collaboration with Jack White, ICP asked White to collaborate once again on The Mighty Death Pop!, but he declined their offer. The 2012 Hallowicked song "Amber Alert" was originally meant to be a part of this album, but the subject matter conflicted with advertiser interests.

== Style and influences ==
=== Lyrics and concept ===
Joseph Bruce stated that the group would "take all the anger we feel and have saved up and stored inside from all the crazy dissing [of] ICP and the Juggalos [...] and we're gonna channel it all into the new album." In keeping with the themes of the other Joker's Cards, the new album will teach the listeners something about themselves.

According to Bruce, The Mighty Death Pop! "teaches us to respect the life we’ve been given and do our best to avoid an early death." The album cover's colors are white, purple and yellow in order to appear harmless, but according to Bruce, the character is actually the most dangerous Joker's Card to date.

=== Music and performance ===
For the album's music, Mike E. Clark appropriated influences which range from the film scores of Danny Elfman to disco, rock and horrorcore.

== Release ==
On April 20, 2012, Psychopathic Records released an infomercial for the album, announcing that it will be available in three separate editions, each with a variant color cover and pre-packaged with one of three bonus albums. The first variant edition, dubbed the Red Pop edition, contains an album of cover songs titled Smothered, Covered & Chunked—designed and illustrated by Detroit artist and graphic designer Patrick Hatfield. The second variant, the Black Pop edition, contains the album Freaky Tales, and the third variant, the White Pop edition, contains the remix album Mike E. Clark's Extra Pop Emporium. Preorders of the album also contain a Mighty Death Pop! keychain.

The first music video from the album, "Chris Benoit", was filmed in June 2012 in the abandoned McLouth Steel mill in Trenton, Michigan. On October 26, the second music video from the album, "Night of the Chainsaw", was released. The video was directed by special effects artist Roy Knyrim, who had previously directed Insane Clown Posse in Death Racers and Chronicles of the Dark Carnival. Its storyline depicts the hallucinations of a drug addict (played by Mark Jury) who murders several people with a chainsaw because he perceives them as flesh-devouring zombies. An additional music video for the song "Where's God?" was released on March 22, 2013. The music video was directed by Douglas Schulze in promotion of the film Mimesis: Night of the Living Dead, which features the song. ICP have also indicated that a new music video directed by the Deka Brothers would be released in 2013. In addition to a music video for "Where's God?", ICP is also planning to release music videos for "Ghetto Rainbows", "The Mighty Death Pop", "Bazooka Joey", and "Forever". There were also leaks of a music video for "Hate Her To Death" on the iTunes music store on February 3, 2013, which ended up being officially released a day later. On July 23, 2013, the music video for "When I'm Clownin'" was released with a cameo appearance from Boondox and a special verse by Danny Brown. The music video was initially going to be the remix featured on Mike E. Clark's Extra Pop Emporium, but the plans were nixed due to Kreayshawn not returning Violent J's calls for appearing in their music video.

The songs from The Mighty Death Pop! album debuted at the Gathering of the Juggalos. Violent J has suggested that Psychopathic may release a box set containing The Mighty Death Pop!, the three bonus albums and a DVD featuring music videos and concert footage. ICP have also stated that this may be the last album that they release in a physical format. The seventh music video from the album is the song "Forever". It was released on July 22, 2014 on Psychopathic: The Videos Volume 2.

On October 11, Psychopathic released a DJ Tool Kit containing instrumentals, a cappellas and remixes from the album. The Mighty Death Pop! was released on vinyl on November 22, 2013.

== Reception ==
Professional ratings
Review scores
Source	Rating
AllMusic	3.5/5 stars
The Daily Blam	5/5 stars
NME	1/10
The Oakland Press	3/5 stars
Spin	7/10

Reviews of The Mighty Death Pop! were mostly positive. The album debuted at number 4 on the Billboard 200 chart, selling 41,000 copies in its first week. It is the third album from the group to debut in the top 5 and ties The Amazing Jeckel Brothers and Bang! Pow! Boom! as the highest peak in the group's history. It has sold 99,000 copies in the US as of April 2015.

The Mighty Death Pop! and Freaky Tales were named the 39th best hip hop album of 2012 by Spin. The Daily Blam named The Mighty Death Pop! the second-best album of the year.

== The Mighty Death Pop! Tour ==
ICP promoted the tour before the album's release; however, they were unable to proceed with it because Violent J needed surgery to repair his meniscus. In an interview in early 2013 they said that the tour would definitely happen. The tour for The Mighty Death Pop! kicked off on May 1, 2013 and concluded on June 2, 2013. The supporting acts for the tour were Moonshine Bandits, Kung Fu Vampire and Axe Murder Boyz. On Father's Day 2013, Violent J married his longtime girlfriend and mother of his two children, Michelle Rapp (Sugar Slam).

== Track listing ==
All tracks are written by Insane Clown Posse, except where noted.

No.	Title	Writer(s)	Length
1.	"Intro"		2:27
2.	"The Mighty Death Pop"		2:48
3.	"Night of the Chainsaw"		3:12
4.	"Chris Benoit"		3:23
5.	"The Blasta"		4:07
6.	"Kickin' Kickin'"		3:38
7.	"Bazooka Joey"		3:20
8.	"Shooting Stars"		2:05
9.	"Juggalo Juice"		3:04
10.	"Hate Her to Death"		4:51
11.	"Skreeem!" (featuring Hopsin and Tech N9ne)	Insane Clown Posse; Hopsin; Tech N9ne	4:40
12.	"Ghetto Rainbows"		3:46
13.	"When I'm Clownin'"		2:24
14.	"Dog Catchers"		1:47
15.	"Daisies"		3:42
16.	"Where's GOD?"		3:41
17.	"Forever"		5:04
18.	Untitled (outtakes; featuring DJ Clay)		5:15
Total length:			63:14

== Personnel ==
Band members and production

- Violent J – vocals, lyrics
- Shaggy 2 Dope – vocals, lyrics
- Mike E. Clark – production, programmer, engineer
- Brian Kuma – production, programmer, engineer
- Joe Strange – production, programmer, engineer

Other personnel

- Rich "Legz Diamond" Murrell – vocals
- Hopsin – guest verse on "Skreem!"
- Tech N9ne – guest verse on "Skreem!"
- DJ Clay – uncredited guest appearance on the outtakes of "The Mighty Death Pop!"
- The Son of Rock, Joey V. – guitar, backing vocals

"The Mighty Death Pop" samples "Every 1's a Winner" by Hot Chocolate

== Chart positions ==
Chart (2012)	Peak position
US Billboard 200	4
