= Catalog number (commercial products) =

A catalog number is an identification number assigned to a purchasable product by an organization which sells goods.

It is similar to the concept of a stock keeping unit. It is sometimes overlapping, but typically distinct from the concept of a part number.
