= 3:33 (album) =

Studio album by Zug Izland
- Released: June 1, 2004
- Length: 44:02
- Label: Ax & Smash

Zug Izland chronology
Cracked Tiles (2003)	3:33 (2004)	The Promised Land / Nebula (2016)

Professional ratings
Review scores
Source	Rating
Allmusic	2/5 stars

3:33 is the second studio album by Zug Izland, released on June 1, 2004.

== Music style ==
Allmusic reviewer Johnny Loftus describes Zug Izland's music style as incorporating elements of piano ballads, goth, industrial and electronic music, nu metal and horror film scores. According to Loftus, "Zug Izland's sparer style [is] unique in an alt-metal climate of two-guitar lineups and monstrous six-string bass bottom ends."

== Reception ==
3:33 peaked at #26 on the Billboard Top Heatseekers chart and at #22 on the Top Independent Albums chart. In his review of the album, Allmusic's Johnny Loftus wrote that "like their mentors in ICP, Zug Izland are very earnest in what they do. Problem is, 3:33 sounds like the result of whatever hundred ideas stuck to their practice space wall [...] their sonics aren't strong enough to raise 3:33's alert level past blue."

== Track listing ==
No.	Title	Writer(s)	Length
1.	"Everything"	Mike P. and Syn	3:03
2.	"Taken"	Mike P. and Syn	3:30
3.	"Saved"	Mike P. and Syn	3:34
4.	"Virgo's Tale"	Mike P. and Syn	2:57
5.	"Hate"	Mike P. and Syn	3:57
6.	"Y"	Mike P. and Syn	2:56
7.	"U"	Mike P. and Syn	3:33
8.	"Ride"	Mike P. and Syn	3:22
9.	"Nothing"	Mike P. and Syn	3:34
10.	"Feel"	Mike P. and Syn	3:34
11.	"Life"	Mike P. and Syn	3:33
12.	"Live"	Mike P. and Syn	3:33
13.	"Interlude"		0:05
14.	"Virgo's Tale (Remix)"	Mike P. and Syn	2:50
Total length:			44:02

== Personnel ==
Information taken from Allmusic.

=== Musicians ===
- Syn — vocals
- Mike Puwal — bass, guitar, keyboards
- Guido Mullingan — bass, background vocals
- Glen Chorazyczewski — background vocals
- Chris Codish — piano
- Michelle Czygan — piano
- Vinnie Dombrowski — background vocals
- Esham — vocals
- Jessica Heit — violin
- Ashley Horak — arranger, drums
- Pat Kepler — background vocals
- Lynx Mona — choir, chorus
- Mickey P. — drums
- Courtney Patrick — background vocals
- Joy Sparks — choir, chorus
- Doug Woern — bass

=== Additional personnel ===
- Mickey P. — drums, producer, engineer, mixing
- Bob Alford — photography
- Tom Baker — mastering
- Brother Al — mixing
- Michael Scotta — artwork
