= Took (disambiguation) =

Took may refer to:

- Took (surname)
- Took, the seventh episode of the fifth season of the HBO original series, The Wire.
