= Ages of Three Children puzzle =

Logic puzzle

The Ages of Three Children puzzle (sometimes referred to as the Census-Taker Problem) is a logical puzzle in number theory which on first inspection seems to have insufficient information to solve. However, with closer examination and persistence by the solver, the question reveals its hidden mathematical clues, especially when the solver lists down all the possible outcomes.

This puzzle illustrates the importance of close inspection while approaching a problem in number theory, while enforcing mathematical thinking and rigor, which is a foundational skill in Mathematical analysis.

== The puzzle ==
A census taker approaches a woman leaning on her gate and asks about her children. She says, "I have three children and the product of their ages is seventy–two. The sum of their ages is the number on this gate." The census taker does some calculation and claims not to have enough information. The woman enters her house, but before slamming the door tells the census taker, "I have to see to my eldest child who is in bed with measles." The census taker departs, satisfied. The problem asks: what are the ages of the three children?

The problem can be presented in different ways, giving the same basic information: the product, that the sum is known, and that there is an oldest child (e.g. their ages adding up to today's date, or the eldest being good at chess).

Another version of the puzzle gives the age product as thirty–six, which leads to a different set of ages for the children.

== Solutions ==
=== For 72 ===
We can utilize the fundamental property of arithmetic to find potential solution sets. The prime factors of 72 are 2, 2, 2, 3 and 3; in other words, $2^3$ x $3^2$ $=$ $72$

This gives the following triplets of possible solutions:

Age one	Age two	Age three	Total (Sum)
1	1	72	74
1	2	36	39
1	3	24	28
1	4	18	23
1	6	12	19
1	8	9	18
2	2	18	22
2	3	12	17
2	4	9	15
2	6	6	14
3	3	8	14
3	4	6	13

Because the census taker knew the total (from the number on the gate) but said that he had insufficient information to give a definitive answer, there must be more than one solution with the same total.

Only two sets of possible ages add up to the same totals:

A. 2 + 6 + 6 = 14

B. 3 + 3 + 8 = 14

In case 'A', there is no 'eldest child': two children are aged six (although one could be a few minutes or around 9 to 12 months older and they still both be 6). Therefore, when told that one child is the eldest, the census-taker concludes that the correct solution is 'B'.

=== For 36 ===
The prime factors of 36 are 2, 2, 3 and 3. This gives the following triplets of possible solutions:

Age one	Age two	Age three	Total (Sum)
1	1	36	38
1	2	18	21
1	3	12	16
1	4	9	14
1	6	6	13
2	2	9	13
2	3	6	11
3	3	4	10

Using the same argument as before it becomes clear that the number on the gate is 13, and the ages 9, 2 and 2.

A criticism of this problem is that a household may have two children of the same age in terms of natural numbers, but different birthdays, such as children in a mixed-parent household.

== See also ==
- Cheryl's Birthday
- Sum and Product Puzzle
