= Syndicated procurement =

Procurement method where concurrent orders are grouped together

Syndicated procurement is a procurement method whereby a syndicate manager groups together multiple concurrent orders from multiple buyers with intent to reduce the purchase price or facilitate delivery. Similar terms in use are "aggregation" and "collective buying".

Example: Five distinct government agencies each require 2,000 new ergonomic office chairs. For an order of 2,000 units, the chair manufacturer is willing to sell at $100 each. Hence, if procuring independently, each government agency will pay $100 per chair. However, for an order of 10,000 chairs, the manufacturer is willing to reduce the price to $70 per unit. The five agencies can therefore pool their demand in order to lower the price by 30%.

Note that the buyers will change nothing in their order, except that they procure in concert, through a syndicate manager.

== Real-world examples ==
=== Auto industry ===
Competing German automobile manufacturers often procure steel in combined orders to reduce price.

=== Government ===
In early 2010 New Zealand’s Ministry of Social Development considered using syndicated procurement to purchase computers collectively with other New Zealand government agencies. In the United Kingdom, Crown Commercial Service (CCS) periodically arranges aggregation opportunities so that several public bodies can achieve savings through their consolidated buying power. Generally these opportunities operate as national further competitions (NFCs) using an existing government framework agreement to which all of the public bodies involved have access. CCS notes that the time involved in assembling a group of customers and collating their needs may mean the procurement process takes longer than it would if customers acted separately.

=== Construction ===
Australian building firms and contractors have begun to use syndicated procurement to purchase building materials. Procurement rounds have yielded price reductions of between 30% and 45%.

== Legal considerations ==
In many jurisdictions syndicated procurement must be executed through a professional manager. Otherwise, competing firms placing orders together can be legally deemed to be price fixing, or artificially controlling market prices. However, syndicated procurement through a professional manager is the legal equivalent of purchasing through a wholesaler, and is therefore legally permissible.

Professional syndicate managers also provide a forum for syndication to competing firms that otherwise might be uncomfortable working together (this benefit is much more relevant to the private sector than to government agencies and non-profits).

== Efficiency ==
Syndicated procurement is potentially more efficient than traditional procurement, because the syndicate manager identifies the precise volume, time, and locus of demand before the order is placed.

1. Traditional procurement chains typically include distributors and wholesalers, who make bulk orders without precise knowledge of the volume of customer demand for a given product, which means that orders can be too large (leftover stock) or to small (unsatisfied customer demand).
2. Distributors and wholesalers do not know when demand will appear, and so risk having to stock items for undetermined periods of time, and incur associated costs (or, conversely, risk not procuring items for which demand exists, and then missing a sale).
3. Finally, distributors and wholesalers do not know precisely where demand will appear, and as a result unwittingly deliver merchandise to points of sale with low demand, while leaving locations with high demand undersupplied. The result is missed sales, or incurring the expense and time lag of transporting the article.

Syndicate managers eliminate these three inefficiencies by knowing in advance exactly where, when, and how much of a given product will be needed.

== Leadership and innovation ==
Facilitated by evolving telecommunications technologies and global logistics services, syndicated procurement is a fairly recent concept. A few pioneers are developing and establishing its methods and conventions:

=== Public sector ===
The New Zealand government has been a leader in introducing syndicated procurement among different government agencies. The New Zealand Ministry of Social Development has been particularly active in encouraging syndicated procurement.
