= Freaky Tales =

Mixtape by Insane Clown Posse
- Released: August 14, 2012
- Recorded: 2012
- Genre: Dirty rap
- Length: 63:05
- Label: Psychopathic
- Producers: Mike E. Clark & Brian Kuma

Freaky Tales is a mixtape by American hip hop duo Insane Clown Posse. Released August 14, 2012, prepackaged with the Black Pop variant edition of The Mighty Death Pop!, it is the group's fifth release with producer Mike E. Clark since his return to Psychopathic Records.

== Background ==
On April 20, 2012, Psychopathic Records released an infomercial for the album The Mighty Death Pop!, announcing that it will be available in three separate editions, each with a variant color cover and prepackaged with a bonus album. The second variant, the Black Pop edition, contains the album Freaky Tales, consisting of an album-length rap.

On July 19, 2012, 30-second snippets of The Mighty Death Pop!, Freaky Tales, and the other two bonus albums pre-packaged with The Mighty Death Pop! were released on amazon.com. A day later, the snippets were removed from the website per Psychopathic Records' request. On August 8, the album along with The Mighty Death Pop! and its other bonus albums were all released early in the 13th Annual Gathering of the Juggalos.

== Concept and lyrics ==
Freaky Tales consists of over 60 minutes of "hoe flows". It was inspired by Too Short's song of the same name, a nine+ minute long sex rap which appeared on his 1987 album Born to Mack. Some sources say it's a cover of the song, although the track that appears on this release is over an hour in length, while the Too Short track is 9 and a half minutes long.

== Reception ==
Professional ratings
Review scores
Source	Rating
The Daily Blam	(favorable)
Spin	(favorable)

Reviewing The Mighty Death Pop! for The Daily Blam, Kevin Skinner favorably reviewed Freaky Tales, calling it "funny but it's definitely the most difficult to grasp". Spin called it "a party record and boundaries-busting endurance test, all at once." The Mighty Death Pop! and Freaky Tales were named the 39th best Hip Hop album of 2012 by Spin.

== Track listing ==
The track listing for the bonus album Freaky Tales was released as part of the Mighty Death Pop infomercial.

Freaky Tales
No.	Title	Length
1.	"Freaky Tales"	60:15
2.	Untitled (outtakes)	2:50

== Personnel ==
Insane Clown Posse

- Violent J – vocals, lyrics
- Shaggy 2 Dope – vocals, lyrics
- Mike E. Clark – production, programmer, engineer
- Brian Kuma – production, programmer, engineer
- Jim Kissling – mastering

Other personnel

- Todd Shaw – original lyrics, concept
- T. Bohanon – original lyrics
- Eric Shetler – album design
