= Japanese destroyer Take =

Two ships of the Japanese Navy have been named Take:

- Japanese destroyer Take (1919), a Momi-class destroyer launched in 1919 and decommissioned in 1940. She was scuttled to be used as a breakwater in 1948
- Japanese destroyer Take (1944), a Matsu-class destroyer launched in 1944 and scrapped in 1947
