= Mike E. Clark's Extra Pop Emporium =

Remix album by Mike E. Clark and Insane Clown Posse
- Released: August 14, 2012
- Label: Psychopathic
- Producer: Mike E. Clark

Mike E. Clark chronology
Psychopathic Murder Mix Volume 2 (2010)	Mike E. Clark's Extra Pop Emporium (2012)

Insane Clown Posse chronology
Featuring Freshness (2011)	Mike E. Clark's Extra Pop Emporium (2012)	Forgotten Freshness Volume 5 (2013)

Mike E. Clark's Extra Pop Emporium is a remix album by Mike E. Clark and Insane Clown Posse, released August 14, 2012, prepackaged with the White Pop variant edition of The Mighty Death Pop!

== Background ==
On April 20, 2012, Psychopathic Records released an infomercial for the album The Mighty Death Pop!, announcing that it will be available in three separate editions, each with a variant color cover and prepackaged with a bonus album. The third variant, the White Pop edition, contains the remix album Mike E. Clark's Extra Pop Emporium, which features remixes, outtakes and leftover songs recorded during The Mighty Death Pop! sessions; these tracks include appearances by Kottonmouth Kings, Three 6 Mafia, Color Me Badd, Ice Cube, Scarface, Geto Boys, Twiztid, Kreayshawn, Swollen Members, Willie D, Jamie Madrox, & Blaze Ya Dead Homie.

On July 19, 2012, 30 second snippets of The Mighty Death Pop!, Mike E. Clark's Extra Pop Emporium, and the other two bonus albums pre-packaged with The Mighty Death Pop! were released on amazon.com. A day later, the snippets were removed from the website per Psychopathic Records' request. On August 8, the album along with The Mighty Death Pop! and its other bonus albums were all released early during the 13th Annual Gathering of the Juggalos.

"Birfday Party" originally had plans of including Das Racist, but despite Heems liking the idea of the track, Kool A.D. decided it wouldn't make for a good idea. "Shugston Brooks 1959–2004" included a sample of REO Speedwagon's "Take It on the Run".

The Insane Clown Posse initially planned to have the remix of "When I'm Clownin'" from the Extra Pop Emporium as a single music video from that album, but they ultimately nixed that plan when Kreayshawn didn't return their calls to appear in their music video. They replaced her verse in their music video with a cameo appearance from Boondox and a new verse by Danny Brown.

== Production ==
Mike E. Clark's Extra Pop Emporium features several songs originally considered for inclusion on The Mighty Death Pop!. These outtakes include "Up Ya Ass", "Birfday Party", "Playin' In The Woods", and "Shugston Brooks 1959–2004". The liner notes include explanations as to why each track was not featured on the main album, as well as stories on how every track came to its fruition. A few songs from The Mighty Death Pop! were not only remixed by Mike E. Clark, but also remixed by Brian Kuma & Joe Strange. Each remix includes at least one additional artist.

== Reception ==
Reviewing The Mighty Death Pop! for The Daily Blam, Kevin Skinner favorably reviewed Mike E. Clark's Extra Pop Emporium, writing "many of the tracks come off even stronger than their standard album counterparts."

== Track listing ==
The track listing for the bonus album Mike E. Clark's Extra Pop Emporium has been confirmed to contain 13 tracks as part of the Mighty Death Pop infomercial. On June 30, 2012, the confirmed track listing for Mike E. Clark's Extra Pop Emporium was released.

Mike E. Clark's Extra Pop Emporium
No.	Title	Writer(s)	Performer(s)	Length
1.	"Traveling Circus"		Insane Clown Posse	0:30
2.	"Chris Benoit" (Kuma's Scrub Club Remix)		Insane Clown Posse, Ice Cube, & Scarface	5:44
3.	"When I'm Clownin'" (Kuma's Clownin' Remix)	Insane Clown Posse & Kreayshawn	Insane Clown Posse & Kreayshawn	3:25
4.	"Lost in the Music"		Insane Clown Posse & Swollen Members	4:28
5.	"Up Ya Ass" (Outtake)		Insane Clown Posse	1:32
6.	"Ghetto Rainbows" (Soft Ass R-N-B Remix)		Insane Clown Posse & Color Me Badd	3:42
7.	"Birfday Party" (Outtake)		Insane Clown Posse	4:13
8.	"Scrubstitute Teachers"		Insane Clown Posse, Twiztid, & Willie D	3:09
9.	"Playin' in the Woods" (Outtake)		Insane Clown Posse	3:31
10.	"Pass It to the Sky"		Insane Clown Posse & Kottonmouth Kings	4:08
11.	"Shugston Brooks 1959–2004" (Outtake)		Insane Clown Posse	4:43
12.	"Night of the Chainsaw" (Joe Strange Remix)		Insane Clown Posse & Three 6 Mafia	3:52
13.	"Forever" (Extended Geto Mix)		Insane Clown Posse & Geto Boys	6:52
14.	Untitled (Outtakes)		Insane Clown Posse, Blaze Ya Dead Homie, & Jamie Madrox	3:56
Total length:				53:45
