= Taken =

Taken may refer to:

== People ==
- Floris Takens (1940–2010), Dutch mathematician

== Arts, entertainment, and media ==
=== Taken film and television franchise ===
- Taken (franchise), a trilogy of action films starring Liam Neeson
  - Taken (film), the first film in the trilogy
  - Taken (2017 TV series), an American television series which acts as an origin story of Bryan Mills
  - Taken: The Search for Sophie Parker, a 2013 made-for-TV film

=== Film ===
- Taken, a 1999 film featuring Michael Rudder
- Taken, a Flash animation by Adam Phillips

=== Television ===
- Taken (2016 TV series), a Canadian true crime documentary series
- Taken (miniseries), a 2002 American science fiction miniseries
- "Taken" (Alias), an episode of Alias
- "Taken" (Arrow), an episode of Arrow
- "Taken" (Law & Order: Special Victims Unit), an episode of Law & Order: Special Victims Unit

=== Literature ===
- Taken (novel), a 2001 novel by Kathleen George
- Taken (Robert Crais novel), the 15th novel in Robert Crais' Elvis Cole/Joe Pike series
- Taken, the third novel in Benedict Jacka's Alex Verus series
- Taken, an omnibus volume comprising the first four novels in the series Left Behind: The Kids
- Taken, a fictional group in the novel The Black Company, by Glen Cook, and other books in the series

=== Music ===
- "Taken" (song), a song by Stellar*
- "Taken", a song by Avail from One Wrench
- "Taken", a song by Muna from Saves the World
- "Taken", a song by One Direction from Up All Night
- "Taken", a song by the Waifs from Sink or Swim
- "Taken", a song by Zug Izland from 3:33

== Other uses ==
- Takens' theorem, Floris Takens' mathematical theorem
- The Taken enemy faction in the video game Destiny 2. This faction is associated with the Hive faction as mindless servants.
