= Accession number =

Accession number may refer to:

- Accession number (bioinformatics), a unique identifier given to a biological polymer sequence (DNA, protein) when it is submitted to a sequence database
- Accession number (cultural property), a unique identifier assigned to each acquisition of a library or museum
