= Purchase-to-pay =

Procurement process

Purchase-to-pay, often abbreviated to P2P and also called Procure-to-Pay and req to check/cheque, refers to the business processes that cover activities of requesting (requisitioning), purchasing, receiving, paying for and accounting for goods and services. Most organisations have a formal process and specialist staff to control this activity so that spending is not wasteful or fraudulent.

Since the dot com bubble more businesses have moved to automated systems in an effort to deliver significant savings in the face of increased procurement costs.
