= Indirect procurement =

Indirect procurement is the sourcing of goods and services not related to manufacturing for a business to enable it to maintain and develop its operations. The goods and services classified under the umbrella of indirect procurement are commonly bought for consumption by internal stakeholders (business units or functions) rather than the external customer or client.

Indirect procurement categories include, but are not limited to:

- Marketing-related services (media buying, agencies)
- Professional Services (consultants, advisers)
- Travel and travel management services
- IT related services (hardware, software)
- HR related services (recruitment agencies, training)
- Facilities management and office services (telecoms, furniture, cleaning, catering, printers)
- Utilities (gas, electricity, water)
- Consumables (grease, oil etc.)
- MRO (Maintenance repair and operations)
- Capital Goods (Plant and machinery)
- Fleet management

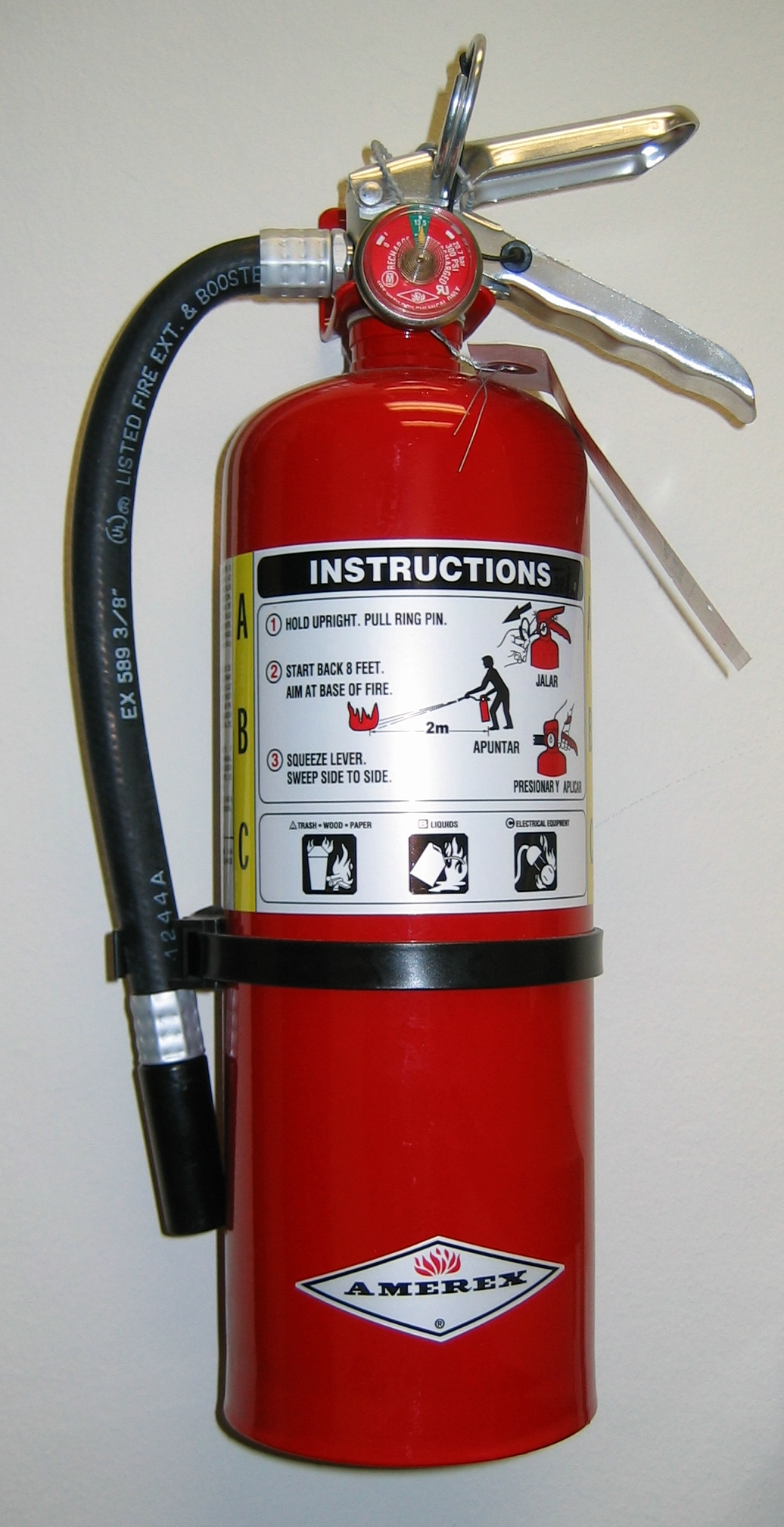
Fire extinguishers are an example of goods not for resale

The overarching classification of ‘indirect’ can vary from business to business. Increasingly, the distinction between a ‘direct’ cost and an ‘indirect’ cost can become blurred (as classic debate of what is Capex and Opex) when looking at such expenditure items, for e.g. Fleet and Transportation. Companies' senior executives are often responsible for agreeing and defining this classification for simplifying their own financial, accounting and reporting structures.

== Overview ==
Organizations with a clear definition of direct procurement (otherwise referred to as Goods for Resale, primary procurement, common goods procurement or core procurement) have spent decades engineering their primary supply chain, ensuring that:

- Goods for resale (GFR) margin is at or above industry standard
- Risk is kept to a minimum
- Long term supply has been assured with preferred suppliers
- Relationships have been built and developed over time
- Processes have been engrained into the core business
- Senior executives and Board members acknowledge the value of the supply chain in the light of business objectives.

Indirect procurement (otherwise referred to as Goods Not for Resale (GNFR), non-core procurement, non-common procurement or enabling spend), compared side-by-side with direct procurement, is often seen as less strategic, relatively immature, and less valuable: research conducted by NelsonHall, in association with Proxima, found that 53% of senior executives from FTSE 100 businesses expressed low satisfaction in the value indirect procurement brought to their organization.

== Indirect vs direct procurement ==
Research conducted in association with Supply Management found that all businesses have indirect procurement. The research also found that indirect procurement is unambiguously different from direct procurement in that it has smaller average supplier spends, more suppliers, more maverick spend and a more complex stakeholder environment than directs. The UK House of Commons Public Accounts Committee defined 'maverick spend' as the purchase of "legitimate goods but [using] unauthorised buying arrangements or unapproved suppliers". Indirect procurement requires a different balance of disciplined processes and technology from those required for direct procurement, wider engagement with stakeholders and more diverse expertise across a range of suppliers. Overall:

- Within the indirect supply market there are hundreds of categories, all of which require deep knowledge to procure effectively. Also, there are tens of thousands of suppliers, all who invest heavily in selling to a buyer – for large contracts it is common for a supplier’s account management team to be larger than the entire Procurement function it is selling to.
- Given the relatively high turnover of indirects, it is also common to see large numbers of low monetary value transactions frequently being carried out.
- There are thousands of stakeholders (internal and external), all with knowledge about their area but need Procurement’s support. This in turn means that Procurement must act as an internal advisor, influencing functional decision makers and budget holders regarding their spend
- Indirect procurement professionals do not actually have any mandate over internal stakeholders' budgets.

Managing indirect expenditure effectively requires a huge variety of skillsets such as:

- A broad range of category expertise
- Change management
- Influencing, engaging and advising various stakeholders across the business (from senior executives down)
- Facilitation, negotiation and supplier management
- Data analysis (turning raw data into business insights and intelligence)
- Technological know-how.
