= Procurement =

Acquisition of goods and services

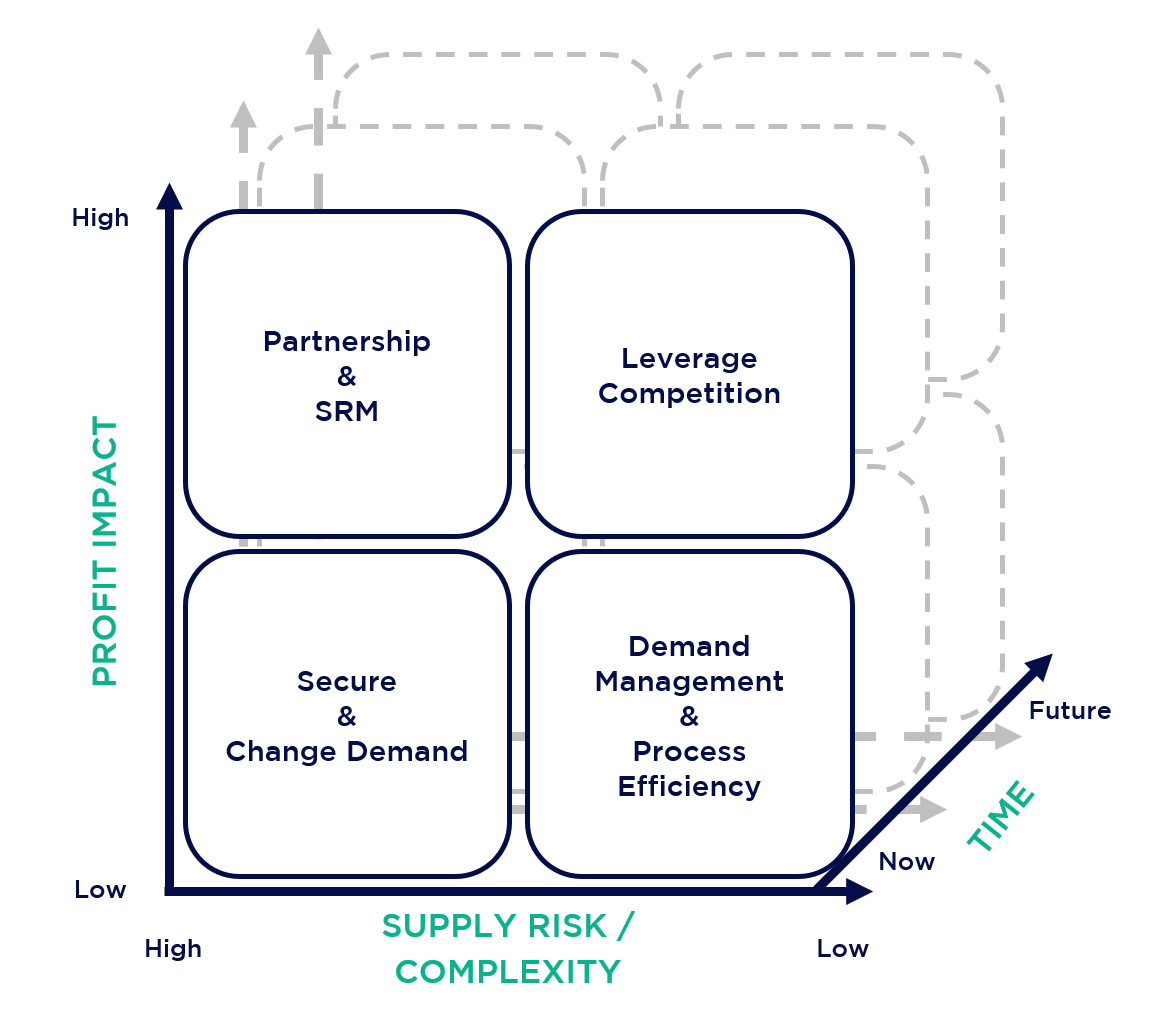
Classification of product categories into the central procurement strategies

Procurement is the commercial process of purchasing goods, services, or other works from external sources, and agreeing the terms on which they will be supplied. Major procurement activity may involve the use of a tendering or competitive bidding process. When a government agency buys goods or services through this practice, it is referred to as government procurement or public procurement. Those who work in procurement tend to be known as procurement agents or purchasing agents. The term "procure" may also refer to a contractual obligation to "procure" something, i.e. to "ensure" that the thing is done.

As an organizational process, procurement is intended to ensure that the buying organization receives goods, services, or works at the best possible price when aspects such as quality, quantity, time, and location are compared. Corporations and public bodies often define processes intended to promote fair and open competition for their business while minimizing risks such as exposure to fraud and collusion. In practice, the procurement process is commonly organized into seven steps that provide structure and consistency across purchasing activities.

Almost all purchasing decisions include factors such as delivery and handling, marginal benefit, and fluctuations in the prices of goods. Organisations that have adopted a corporate social responsibility perspective are also likely to require their purchasing activity to take wider societal and ethical considerations into account. On the other hand, the introduction of external regulations concerning accounting practices can affect ongoing buyer-supplier relations in unforeseen ways.

== Overview ==
The Institute for Supply Management (ISM) defines procurement as an organizational function that includes specification development, value analysis, supplier market research, negotiation, buying activities, contract administration, inventory control, traffic, receiving and stores. Federal US legislation defines procurement as including

all stages of the process of acquiring property or services, beginning with the process for determining a need for property or services and ending with contract completion and closeout.

A company's procurement function, specifically its spending on suppliers, typically accounts for more than half of the company's total budget.

Purchasing is a subset of procurement that specifically deals with the ordering and payment of goods and services. Organizational procurement is also referred to as "organizational buying" or "institutional buying," for example, in studies of the buying behavior of staff involved in purchasing decision-making.

Procurement activities are also often divided into two distinct categories, direct and indirect spend. Direct spend refers to the production-related procurement that encompasses all items that are part of finished products, such as raw materials, components and parts. Direct procurement, which is the focus in supply chain management, directly affects the production process of manufacturing firms. In contrast, indirect procurement concerns non-production-related acquisition: a wide variety of goods and services, from standardized items like office supplies and safety equipment to complex and costly products and services like heavy equipment, consulting services, and outsourcing services.

	Direct procurement	Indirect procurement	
	Raw material and production goods	Maintenance, repair, and operating supplies, outsourcing	Capital goods and services
Quantity	Large	Low	Low
Value	Industry-specific	Low	High
Nature	Operational	Tactical	Strategic
Process	Scheduled	Scheduled or Unscheduled	Capital Project
Examples	Steel, Resin, Rubber	Safety Equipment, spare parts, IT	Warehouses, Vehicles, Oil Wells

A 2011 report found that the average procurement department manages 60.6% of total enterprise spend. This measure, commonly called "spend under management" or "managed spend", refers to the percentage of total enterprise spend (which includes all direct and indirect spend) that a procurement organization manages or influences. Alternatively, the term may refer to the percentage of addressable spend which is influenced by procurement, "addressable spend" being the expenditure which could potentially be influenced. The average procurement department also achieved an annual saving of 6.7% in the last reporting cycle, sourced 52.6% of its addressable spend, and has a contract compliance rate of 62.6%. A more restrictive definition of "spend under management" includes only expenditure that makes use of preferred supplier contracts and negotiated payment rates and terms.

== History ==
The first record of what would be recognized now as the purchasing department of an industrial operation relates to the railway companies of the 19th century:

"The intelligence and fidelity exercised in the purchase, care and use of railway supplies influences directly the cost of construction and operating and affect the reputations of officers and the profits of owners."

Organized procurement has its roots in military logistics, where armies required structured systems for supplying troops with personnel, equipment, and material.

The modern history of corporate procurement often dates back to Henry Ford's response to the supply disruptions of World War I. After the war cut off supplies such as British-controlled rubber from Ceylon, and amidst Ford's mistrust of his own suppliers' practices, Ford moved from assembling parts made by outside firms toward full vertical integration.

Trust in supplier networks was restored during World War II, when the U.S. War Production Board coordinated the distribution of materials and converted American industry to military production. General Motors at the time developed a variant of vertical integration by creating "captive suppliers" that balanced the benefits of in-house production with the cost and efficiency benefits of a free market.

In the wake of the 1973 oil crisis triggered by an OPEC embargo, Japanese automakers found an opportunity to capture market share. In addition to focusing on manufacturing smaller, more fuel-efficient cars, they also changed their manufacturing processes. Toyota had already begun developing what became known as the Toyota Production System, incorporating kanban scheduling and kaizen. A central element was keiretsu, a network in which Toyota took minority equity stakes in key suppliers, binding the companies together through mutual financial interest rather than outright ownership.

Facing continued Japanese competition in the 1980s, General Motors pursued aggressive cost reductions from suppliers and introduced a supplier-efficiency program known as PICOS, an acronym for "program for the improvement and cost optimization of suppliers", sending teams to analyze suppliers' manufacturing processes directly.

As outsourcing and global sourcing expanded through the 1990s, the resulting proliferation of direct supplier relationships became difficult to manage, leading to the practice of supplier tiering, in which large "tier-1" suppliers take responsibility for coordinating "tier-2" suppliers.

Since the 2000s, large technology companies such as Apple and Dell have moved away from the vertically integrated, plant-owning model exemplified by Ford. Instead they orchestrate extensive global networks of specialist suppliers bound by contractual and collaborative relationships rather than by equity stakes. For example, Apple does not manufacture the iPhone itself, but retains ownership of much of its underlying intellectual property, including its own silicon chip designs, and directs specialist suppliers down to the level of individual components.

Tim Cook, who became Apple's chief executive in 2011 after serving as the company's head of worldwide operations and procurement, is frequently cited as an example of a supply-chain and procurement specialist rising to lead a major corporation.

== Sourcing and acquisition ==
Procurement is one component of the broader concept of sourcing and acquisition. Typically procurement is viewed as more tactical in nature (the process of physically buying a product or service) and sourcing and acquisition are viewed as more strategic and encompassing. The term procurement is used to reflect the entire purchasing process or cycle, and not just the tactical components. Procurement software (often labeled as e-procurement software) manages purchasing processes electronically.

=== Acquisition processes ===
Some aspects of a procurement process may need to be initiated ahead of the majority of the project, for example where there are extensive lead times. Such cases may be referred to as "advance procurement".

Many writers also refer to procurement as a cyclical process, which commences with a definition of business needs and develops a specification, undertakes search activities or places advertising aimed at identifying suppliers and adopts appropriate methods for consulting with them, inviting and evaluating proposals, secures on contract and takes delivery of a new asset or accepts performance of a service, manages the ownership of the asset or the delivery of the service and reaches an end-of-life point where the asset becomes due for replacement or the service contract terminates. At this point the cycle would recommence. Bunn notes that search activities are a central preliminary action to be undertaken before buying decisions can be made.

The Chartered Institute of Procurement & Supply (CIPS) recommends involvement of procurement staff and skills from an early stage in the cycle, noting that such "early procurement involvement" can have a beneficial impact on the nature and timing of any approach to market, the specification and the sourcing strategy and supplier selection approach adopted.

=== Decision-making ===
Procurement decisions fall along a continuum from simple buying transactions to more complex buyer-supplier collaborations, and the buying behaviour of staff involved in purchasing decision-making has been widely studied. There is a consensus among scholars and marketing managers that buyers utilise various decision processes as appropriate to each buying situation, and some purchasing decisions are especially complex. Some writers treat purchasing decisions as examples of rational behaviour made in the context of a business aim such as profit maximisation and make the assumption that decision-makers have access to the information they need for their decision. Feldman and Cordozo questioned this approach in a 1969 article, suggesting that industrial buyer decision-making had similarities with consumer buying behaviour. David T. Wilson suggested in a 1971 article that an individual buyer's personality should be considered in understanding buyers' decision processes. Three distinct personality traits have been described in the literature on this subject:

- a trait displaying a high need for certainty
- a trait reflecting a high degree of generalised self-confidence
- a need to achieve a trait.

Wilson found that there was some correlation between personality traits and decision-making styles among the Canadian buyers who participated in his research study. Jagdish Sheth published A Model of Industrial Buyer Behavior in 1973, which drew from a large volume of empirical study of buyer behaviour and emphasised how the "psychological world of the decision-makers" impacted on the processes and outcomes of purchasing decision-making.

There are wide variations in the involvement of procurement staff in purchasing decisions across types of organisation and across varying purchasing situations. Some purchasing decisions are made by individuals or groups of individuals referred to as a "buying center" or "decision-making unit", where procurement personnel may in some cases be central, in other cases peripheral, to the purchasing decision. From a marketing perspective, buying center research has looked at which individuals and organisational divisions become part of the decision-making group, how they interact, and the internal and external factors which influence purchasing outcomes. Wesley Johnson and Thomas Bonoma, in a 1981 research paper, found situations where "the purchasing manager's centrality is likely to be high", and equally situations where their centrality "is likely to be low", recommending that "purchasing managers desiring to increase their influence" should aim to play a pivotal role in the internal communications linking the various individuals and organisational divisions involved.

== Specific types ==
=== Government procurement ===
Government procurement or public procurement is the purchase of goods, works (construction), or services by the state, such as by a government agency or a state-owned enterprise. In 2019, public procurement accounted for approximately 12% of GDP in OECD countries. In 2021, the World Bank Group estimated that public procurement made up about 15% of global GDP. Therefore, government procurement accounts for a substantial part of the global economy.

=== Sustainable procurement ===
Sustainable procurement is a process whereby organizations meet their needs for goods, services, works and utilities in a way that achieves value for money on a life-cycle basis while addressing equity principles for sustainable development, therefore benefiting societies and the economy across time and geographies while remaining within the carrying capacity of the environment. Procurement is often conducted via a tendering or competitive bidding process. The process is used to ensure the buyer receives goods, services or works for the best possible price, when aspects such as quality, quantity, time, and location are compared. Procurement is considered sustainable when organizations broadens this framework by meeting their needs for goods, services, works, and utilities in a way that achieves value for money and promotes positive outcomes not only for the organization itself but for the economy, environment, and society.

=== Electronic procurement ===
Electronic procurement is the purchasing of goods by businesses through the internet or other networked computer connection. Electronic data interchange (EDI) was a forerunner to electronic procurement, this consisted of standardized transmission of data such as inventories and good required electronically. Schoenherr argues that EDI developed from standardized manifests for deliveries to Berlin during the Berlin Airlift which were applied by DuPont in the 1960s and argues that material requirements planning and enterprise resource planning were both forerunners of electronic procurement. E-procurement involves various components like e-sourcing, e-tendering, e-auctions.

=== Joint procurement ===
Joint procurement takes place when two or more organisations share purchasing activities, and therefore has a more specifically buyer-side focus than many examples of collaborative buyer-seller relationships. Companies may decide to work together for the following reasons:

- transaction cost economics approach, where the total transaction costs of the actors involved are lower when they work together
- resource dependence approach, and the resource based view, where the group of actors is able to create a resource, market power, which they would be unable to exercise independently
- neo-classical economics' case, arguing that certain functions become separate, specialised units in order to obtain scale effects
- neo-institutionalism - the argument that actors work together because it is the thing to do these days.

Joint or collaborative procurement is a common practice within public sector procurement. There are central purchasing bodies in many countries which coordinate joint purchasing activities for public sector organisations. A report commissioned by the European Parliament's Committee on the Internal Market and Consumer Protection (IMCO) has recommended that EU Member States "should consider creating Central Purchasing Bodies (CPBs)" in order to secure "coherent and coordinated procurement".

On a trans-national scale, Guyana, Barbados and Rwanda announced "a programme of mutual support for the local manufacturing of vaccines and medicines" in July 2023 for which a "pooled procurement mechanism" would be required.

=== Other types ===
- Best value procurement – Procurement method that looks at many factors
- Syndicated procurement – Procurement method where concurrent orders are grouped together

== Measuring performance ==
The Chartered Institute of Procurement & Supply (CIPS) promotes a model of "five rights", which it suggests are "a traditional formula expressing the basic objectives of procurement and the general criteria by which procurement performance is measured", namely that goods and services purchased should be of the 'right quality', in the 'right quantity', delivered to the 'right place' at the 'right time' and obtained at the 'right price'. CIPS has in the past also offered an alternative listing of the five rights as "buy[ing] goods or services of the right quality, in the right quantity, from the right source, at the right time and at the right price. 'Right source' is added as a sixth right in CIPS' 2018 publication, Contract Administration.

Delivery on a savings target or goal is an important part of the procurement function, but this objective is generally seen as form of value generation rather than cost reduction. CIPS also notes that securing savings is "one measure of purchasing performance", but argues that savings should only be used as a measure of performance where they are "a reflection of the [organisation]'s ... expectations of the purchasing and supply management function". CIPS distinguishes between "savings", which can reduce budgets, and "cost avoidance", which "attempts to thwart price increases and to keep within budget". Examples of savings as a beneficial outcome include:

- Agreeing to a reduction in price, obtaining the same item for less cost.
- Sourcing or developing a supply of a lower-quality item at a reduced cost, where the item is still fit for purpose.
- Obtaining added value for the same cost, e.g. negotiating extended warranties, additional spare parts etc.

A.T. Kearney has developed a model for assessing the performance of a procurement organisation or the procurement function within a wider organisation, ROSMA^{SM} (Return on Supply Management Assets), arguing that it enables a procurement department to "measure and explain procurement and supply's value in terms your CFO and CEO will understand, using a common financial standard". Findings in 2020 suggested that "top quartile procurement performers have ROSMA scores two to three times higher than those in the middle two quartiles". A.T. Kearney's report suggests a close match between the self-reported performance of CPOs in the best performing departments and the view of procurement held by the CFO and the organisation more widely, and also notes that weaker performers or "inconsequentials" share a distinct profile marked by lack of "identifiable leadership accountable for procurement's performance.

Spend under management also contributes to an additional measure of procurement performance or procurement efficiency: procurement operating expenses as a percentage of managed spend.

The intensity of competition during procurement can be measured by the number of bids. Division of the procurement into smaller lots and the possibility of negotiation can increase competition. Competition law can prevent bid rigging.

== Personnel and roles ==
Personnel who undertake procurement on behalf of an organization may be referred to as procurement officers, professionals or specialists, buyers or supply managers. The US Federal Acquisition Regulation refers to Contracting Officers. Staff in managerial positions may be referred to as Purchasing Managers or Procurement Managers. The ISM refers to "the supply profession".

A Purchasing or Procurement Manager's responsibilities may include:

- approving orders
- seeking reliable vendors or suppliers to provide quality goods at reasonable prices
- negotiating prices and contracts, and securing cost savings. (Note: Bartolini and Dwyer note that allocating the benefits of savings across an organization, e.g. by negotiating departmental budget reductions, should not be treated as a procurement role: this is a financial role.)
- reviewing technical specifications for raw materials, components, equipment or buildings
- determining and monitoring quantity and timing of deliveries (more commonly in small companies)
- forecasting upcoming demand
- supervision of other procurement staff and agents.

Katiana Iavarone of the Belgian company Bekaert notes that procurement staff "need to be agile, to run alone, and connect with different stakeholders", adding that this agility involves moving readily from one initiative to another.

Category management represents a system of organising the roles of staff within a procurement team "in such a way as to focus ... on the [external] supply markets of an organisation", rather than being organised according to the organisation's internal departmental structure.

Specialist procurement roles include construction buyers and travel buyers. Part of the work of a corporate travel buyer is the formulation and implementation of a corporate travel policy.

In many larger organizations the procurement and supply function is led by a board-level or other senior position such as a Director of Supply Chain or a chief procurement officer (CPO). In other cases, procurement is overseen by the chief financial officer (CFO) or Director of Finance, or the growing need for liaison between the CFO and the procurement function has been recognised. A 2006 report by the National Audit Office in the UK commented that in the further education sector, where procurement practice was not well developed and college organisations were relatively small, oversight of procurement by the Director of Finance was a typical arrangement. A survey of UK company directors published in 2023 found that 69% of executives operating at a director level "understood what procurement could offer their organisation" and 63% believed that internal perceptions of what the procurement team could offer had improved during the previous 12 months.

Independent or third party personnel who undertake procurement or negotiate purchases on behalf of an organization may be called purchasing agents or buying agents, although the term "purchasing agent" has a longer and broader history: the Institute for Supply Management in the United States was originally called the National Association of Purchasing Agents from its formation in 1915. A commercial agent may both purchase and sell on behalf of a third party. Third party advice on procurement processes, savings opportunities and supply chain operations is often called "procurement consultancy", although a basic internal consultancy capability is also an important procurement skill.

US Bureau of Labor Statistics research found that there were 526,200 purchasing manager, buyer and purchasing agent positions in the United States in 2019. Various writers have noted that businesses may reduce the numbers of purchasing staff during a recession along with staff in other business areas, despite a tendency to become more dependent on bought-in goods and services as operations contract. For example, US business executive Steve Collins observed that in one major company the purchasing staff base "was downsized some 30% during the [2010] recession, 'but the expectations for the remaining employees remained unchanged ... The additional workload placed on the remaining employees following the downsizing created a much more challenging environment'". In 2021 the Australasian Procurement and Construction Council (APCC) put forward an appeal asking everyone working in the procurement profession in Australia to include the term in their occupational title when completing their August 2021 census return.

The European Commission issued a recommendation in October 2017 directed towards the "professionalisation of public procurement" so that Member States could "attract, develop and retain" staff in public purchasing roles, focus on performance and "make the most out of the available tools and techniques". Research undertaken in 2020 highlighted the importance of social or "soft" skills within the skill sets of professional procurement staff, while drawing in talented staff without an established procurement background has been seen as one way to sustain the profession and resolve skill shortages. Sales staff, for example, often have negotiation skills and market knowledge which lend themselves to a successful transfer into procurement.

=== Participation of women ===
Some writers have observed that there are limited opportunities for women to enter procurement because of stereotypes that treat some roles as inappropriate for women. Sara Omer, a MENA-based sales director, has observed that senior positions in middle eastern procurement are often filled by expatriate women rather than women from the region who have progressed in their careers.

Management consultant Oliver Wyman reported in 2019 that, based on a survey of over 300 CPOs in Europe, US, and Asia working across 14 industries, 38% of the staff in the procurement organizations surveyed were women: 60% of CPOs stated that there were more women in their organization than three years previously, while 6% said that the number of women had decreased. The effect of this growing involvement of women in procurement was recognised in the form of "more creativity and innovation", acknowledged by 76% of the CPOs surveyed.

== Legal aspects ==
A contractual obligation to procure refers to an absolute obligation to ensure that the action is done or the condition is met. For example, when a party to a construction contract is obligated to apply for the permits required to commence work, that party is obligated to apply for them. Where such a contract is silent as to which party is responsible to seek permits, but only one party is capable of doing so, it is implicit within the contract that the capable party will obtain permits within a reasonable time frame so as to allow the work to proceed.

The use of the word "procure" in a joint venture agreement between Nearfield Ltd., Lincoln Nominees Ltd., and other partners, in relation to the utilisation of a bank loan, gave rise to a dispute between the parties regarding the meaning of the word "procure", which was resolved in 2006 by the judge, Peter Smith, confirming that the "normal meaning of the word" is clear and well understood: "I do not see that procure means anything other than as Nearfield [the claimant] puts it 'see to it'". In this case, the obligation to "procure the payment" of the loan amounted to a guarantee of that loan.

== Future scenarios ==
Various commentators have made projections regarding the future of procurement. Charlotte Payne, general manager of CIPS in Australia and New Zealand, suggests that "procurement's role in sustainability is going to be massive", while a CIPS general overview anticipates that "there is little chance that procurement and supply will enter a period of calm any time soon".

== See also ==
- Bidder conferences
- Global sourcing
- Group purchasing organization
- Procurement outsourcing
- Performance Based Contracting
- Strategic sourcing
