= Hatchet Attacks (2012) =

2012 professional wrestling and concert pay-per-view event

- Promotional poster for the event
- Promotion: Juggalo Championship Wrestling
- Date: May 25, 2012
- City: Farmington, New Mexico
- Venue: McGee Park Memorial Coliseum

Pay-per-view chronology
← Previous; Bloodymania V	Next → Road to Bloodymania 6

Hatchet Attacks chronology
← Previous; 2011	Next → Last

Hatchet Attacks (2012) was a professional wrestling and concert pay-per-view (PPV) event produced by Juggalo Championship Wrestling (JCW) and its parent company Psychopathic Records. It took place on May 25, 2012, at McGee Park Memorial Coliseum in Farmington, New Mexico and was streamed live and exclusively online via. Psychopathic Live and UStream.

== Background ==
=== Production ===
On May 20, 2012, Psychopathic Records announced the lineup for the fourth Hatchet Attacks event. The event would feature live musical performances from Blaze Ya Dead Homie, Anybody Killa, Cold 187, Boondox, Twiztid, and Insane Clown Posse and would be streamed live as an internet pay-per-view on Psychopathic Live and Ustream. In addition to the live music performances, the event would feature several JCW matches including 2 Tuff Tony vs. Kongo Kong for the vacant JCW Heavyweight Championship, The Weedman vs. Officer Colt Cabana, and Shawn Daivari vs. mystery opponent alongside appearances from Kevin Nash and Sean Waltman. Further matches for the event would be announced including the Juggalo World Order (Kevin Nash and Sean Waltman) being accompanied by Scott Hall vs. The Headbangers (Mosh and Thrasher).

=== Storylines ===
Hatchet Attacks featured professional wrestling matches that involved different wrestlers from pre-existing scripted feuds, plots, and storylines that were played at Juggalo Championship Wrestling's various events. Wrestlers were portrayed as either a villain or a hero as they followed a series of events that built tension, and culminated into a wrestling match or series of matches. The event featured wrestlers from Juggalo Championship Wrestling's roster.

== Results ==
Other on-screen personnel
Role:	Name:
Disk Jockey	DJ Clay
Commentator	Kevin Gill
Ring announcer	Legz Diamond

No.	Results	Stipulations
1	The Ring Rydas (Ring Ryda Blue and Ring Ryda Red) and Zach Gowen defeated The Freak Squad (Dom Vitalli and GQ Gallo) and Joey	Six man tag team match
2	The Weedman defeated Officer Colt Cabana	Singles match
3	Necro Butcher defeated Shawn Daivari	Singles match
4	Juggalo World Order (Kevin Nash and Sean Waltman) (with Scott Hall) defeated The Headbangers (Mosh and Thrasher)	Tag team match
5	2 Tuff Tony defeated Kongo Kong	Singles match for the vacant JCW Heavyweight Championship

== Music performers ==
- Anybody Killa
- Axe Murder Boyz
- Boondox
- Cold 187
- DJ Clay
- The Dayton Family
- Boondox
- Mike E. Clark
- Twiztid
- Insane Clown Posse
