= Road to Bloodymania 6 =

2012 Juggalo Championship Wrestling pay-per-view event and tour

- Promotional poster featuring 2 Tuff Tony, Scott Hall, Rhino and the Insane Clown Posse
- Promotion: Juggalo Championship Wrestling
- Date: July 5–7, 2012
- City: Night 1: Taylor, Michigan; Night 2: Grand Rapids, Michigan; Night 3: Milwaukee, Wisconsin
- Venue: Night 1: Taylor Town Trade Center; Night 2: The Orbit Room; Night 3: Miramar Theater

Juggalo Championship Wrestling event chronology
← Previous; Hatchet Attacks	Next → Midnight at the Gathering

Road to Bloodymania 6 was a three-night professional wrestling pay-per-view event and tour produced by Juggalo Championship Wrestling. The tour took place on July 5, 2012 at the Taylor Town Trade Center in Taylor, Michigan, July 6, 2012 at The Orbit Room in Grand Rapids, Michigan, and July 7, 2012 the Miramar Theater in Milwaukee, Wisconsin and was streamed live on Psychopathic Live.

== Production ==
=== Background ===
On June 27, 2012, JCW announced a three-night tour titled the "Road to Bloodymania 6" which would build up to the Bloodymania 6 pay-per-view at the Gathering of the Juggalos. Confirmed wrestlers on the tour were 2 Tuff Tony, The Ring Rydas, Kongo Kong, The Weedman, Shockwave The Robot, Officer Colt Cabana, Zach Gowen, Mad Man Pondo, and Necro Butcher.

=== Storylines ===
Road to Bloodymania 6 featured professional wrestling matches that involved different wrestlers from pre-existing scripted feuds, plots, and storylines that were played at Juggalo Championship Wrestling's various events. Wrestlers were portrayed as either a villain or a hero as they followed a series of events that built tension, and culminated into a wrestling match or series of matches. The event featured wrestlers from Juggalo Championship Wrestling's roster.

== Results ==
Other on-screen personnel
Role:	Name:
Disk Jockey	DJ Clay
Commentators	Kevin Gill
Commentators	Shaggy 2 Dope

Night 1 - July 5, 2012
No.	Results	Stipulations
1	Jimmy Jacobs defeated Butler Geeves by pinfall	Singles match
2	Steve Corino defeated Shockwave The Robot by pinfall	Singles match
3	The Ring Rydas (Ring Ryda Blue and Ring Ryda Red) (c) defeated Mad Man Pondo and Necro Butcher by pinfall	Tag team match for the JCW Tag Team Championship
4	Officer Colt Cabana defeated Zach Gowen by pinfall	Singles match
5	2 Tuff Tony (c) defeated Rhino by pinfall	Singles match for the JCW Heavyweight Championship
6	Corporal Robinson and The Rude Boy defeated The Nigerian Nightmares (Maifu and Saifu) by pinfall	Tag team match
(c) / – the champion(s) heading into the match

Night 2 - July 6, 2012
No.	Results	Stipulations
1	Steve Corino defeated Zach Gowen by pinfall	Singles match
2	Breyer Wellington (with Butler Geeves) defeated Rhino and Sabu by pinfall	Three way match
3	The Weedman defeated Jimmy Jacobs by pinfall	Singles match
4	Kongo Kong defeated Shockwave The Robot by pinfall	Singles match
5	Ring Girl Randy defeated Miss Geeves (with Butler Geeves) by pinfall	Singles match
6	The Ring Rydas (Ring Ryda Blue and Ring Ryda Red) (c) defeated defeated The Nigerian Nightmares (Maifu and Saifu) by pinfall	Tag team match for the JCW Tag Team Championship
7	2 Tuff Tony (c) defeated Officer Colt Cabana by pinfall	Singles match for the JCW Heavyweight Championship
8	Mad Man Pondo and Necro Butcher defeated Corporal Robinson and The Rude Boy by pinfall	Falls count anywhere tag team match
(c) / – the champion(s) heading into the match

Night 3 - July 7, 2012
No.	Results	Stipulations
1	Ring Girl Randy defeated Valentina by pinfall	Singles match
2	The Ring Rydas (Ring Ryda Blue and Ring Ryda Red) defeated Shockwave The Robot and Zach Gowen by pinfall	Tag team match
3	Steve Corino vs. The Weedman ended in a no contest	Singles match
4	Mad Man Pondo and Necro Butcher vs. The Nigerian Nightmares (Maifu and Saifu) ended in a no contest	No disqualification tag team match
5	Kongo Kong defeated Rhino by pinfall	Singles match for the JCW Heavyweight Championship
6	2 Tuff Tony (c) defeated Jimmy Jacobs by pinfall	Singles match for the JCW Heavyweight Championship
7	Corporal Robinson defeated Ian Rotten by pinfall	Anything goes falls count anywhere match
(c) / – the champion(s) heading into the match
