= What's on My Mind =

What's on My Mind may refer to:

- What's on My Mind?, 1995 album by The Dayton Family
- "What's on My Mind" (Kansas song)", 1976
- "What's on My Mind", a song by the Cranberries from Bury the Hatchet (1999)
