= Psychopathic Live =

Professional wrestling pay-per-view streaming service owned by Psychopathic Records

- Broadcast area: Worldwide
- Headquarters: Farmington Hills, Michigan, United States

Programming
- Language: English

Ownership
- Parent: Psychopathic Records

History
- Launched: April 6, 2011
- Closed: 2013

Links
- Website: psychopathiclive.com

Psychopathic Live was an internet pay-per-view streaming service owned by Psychopathic Records. The service was launched in 2011 to stream various pay-per-view events promoted by Juggalo Championship Wrestling along with select major concerts organized by Psychopathic Records.

== History ==
Following the success of Hatchet Attacks, Psychopathic Records announced that they would be launching the Psychopathic Live website to stream its events on, beginning with Lights, Camera, Bash Em'. Throughout 2011, the service would be the exclusive streaming home for Juggalo Championship Wrestling events including Up in Smoke, F*** The Police, Send in the Clowns, Above The Law, and St. Andrews Brawl. From August 11, 2011 to August 14, 2011, the service would stream live performances from the 2011 Gathering of the Juggalos including two JCW events and live performances from Psychopathic Records artists including the Insane Clown Posse, Twiztid, Boondox, Ice Cube, Tech N9ne, Kottonmouth Kings, The Dayton Family, and Blaze Ya Dead Homie. On May 25, 2012, Psychopathic Live would stream the entirety of the Hatchet Attacks event which featured professional wrestling matches from Juggalo Championship Wrestling (JCW) and live performances from Anybody Killa, the Axe Murder Boyz, Boondox, Cold 187, DJ Clay, The Dayton Family, Boondox, Mike E. Clark, Twiztid, and Insane Clown Posse. From February 16, 2013 to February 17, 2013, Psychopathic Live streamed concerts from the 2013 Juggalo Day in Detroit which included live performances from the Insane Clown Posse, Myzery, and Project Born.
