= Overtake (disambiguation) =

Overtake, an English verb. About the act of one vehicle going past another, see: Overtaking

Overtake may also refer to:

- Overtake (video game), a 1992 video game
- Overtake!, a 2023 anime television series
