= Zero Divide 2 =

1997 video game

- European cover art
- Developer: Zoom
- Publishers: JP: Zoom; PAL: Sony Computer Entertainment
- Director: Akira Sato
- Producer: Akira Sato
- Writer: Masakazu Fukuda
- Composer: Akihito Okawa
- Platform: PlayStation
- Release: JP: 1997; PAL: 1998
- Genre: Fighting
- Modes: Single-player, multiplayer

Zero Divide 2 is a 1997 fighting game produced by Zoom for the PlayStation as the sequel to Zero Divide (1995). The game introduces new characters, walls in arenas, and breakable armor. It has an increased frame rate of 60 per second. (Note: Limited to 50 in the PAL version) Zero Divide 2 was released in Japan and then in 1998 in PAL regions, and was followed by the Japan exclusive Zero Divide: The Final Conflict for Sega Saturn.

== Characters ==
In addition to the eight returning characters from the first game, new characters are: Pixel, Cancer, Nox, and Eve.

== Reception ==
Reception

Review scores
Publication	Score
Famitsu	31/40
HobbyConsolas	68%
PlayStation Official Magazine – UK	5/10
Dengeki PlayStation	80/100, 85/100, 75/100, 90/100

Critics had claimed that it was not too different from the first game and that it was outdated compared to contemporary fighting video games. British magazine Play criticised the game and asking why Sony would release it so soon after Tekken 3. German magazine MANiAC, in a retrospective review, called the polygon look and combat "unspectacular".

In Japan, Famitsu gave the game a score of 31 out of 40.
