= Family Feud (album) =

Studio album by The Dayton Family
- Released: July 12, 2005
- Genre: Hardcore hip hop
- Length: 1:13:40
- Label: Fast Life Records
- Producer: Gee Peirce

The Dayton Family chronology
Welcome to the Dopehouse (2002)	Family Feud (2005)	Return to Dayton Ave (2006)

Professional ratings
Review scores
Source	Rating
AllMusic	3.5/5 stars

Family Feud is the fourth studio album by American hip-hop group The Dayton Family. It was released on July 12, 2005, via Fast Life Records. The album spawned two singles: "Chevys" and "Can't Get Out."

== Track listing ==
1. Family Feud
2. Bulldoggin'
3. Where You From (featuring Capone)
4. Chevys
5. What Would You Do
6. Murder on My Block
7. Hate Me If You Wanna
8. What is Your Issue?
9. I'm a Gangsta
10. Ass Whoop
11. We Won't Fall
12. Reckless (featuring Cormega)
13. Calico (featuring Kurupt)
14. Everyday Hoe (featuring MC Breed)
15. Dayton Niggaz
16. Formula 51
17. Get Crunk
18. Everything's Chicken (But the Bone)
19. Can't Get Out

== Chart history ==
Chart (2005)	Peak position
US Top R&B/Hip-Hop Albums (Billboard)	86
