= Collective League of Adrenaline Strength and Honor =

American independent professional wrestling promotion

- Acronym: CLASH
- Founded: 2008
- Style: Professional wrestling
- Headquarters: Lincoln Park, Michigan
- Founder: Jeremy Jones
- Owner: Jeremy Jones
- Website: clashprowrestling.com

The Collective League of Adrenaline Strength and Honor (CLASH), also known as CLASH Wrestling, is an American independent professional wrestling promotion based in Lincoln Park, Michigan.

== History ==
CLASH launched on January 4, 2008 with their first show being held in Taylor, Michigan. On the inaugural show, the promotion crowned its inaugural CLASH champion with Cameron Skyy being the first champion. On March 22, 2008, CLASH held the inaugural Triple Crown Cup tournament which featured several three-way matches as part of the tournament and was won by Tommy Tydie. On June 13, 2008 and June 14, 2008, CLASH held its first NPCI invitational tag team tournament at the Taylor Town Trade Center in Taylor, Michigan with the winners of the tournament being J. Miller and Tommy Tydie.

In 2010, CLASH formed a working relationship with Chikara, an independent professional wrestling promotion based in Philadelphia, Pennsylvania with their first cross-promotional even being The Great Aggression CLASH vs. Chikara. On June 26, 2010, CLASH wrestlers were featured on Chikara's first stand-alone event in Michigan titled We Must Eat Michigan’s Brain which featured a CLASH tag team showcase match with Cameron Skyy and J Miller fighting against Tommy Treznik and GQ Gallo. On April 9, 2010, Cameron Skyy, J. Miller, and Tommy Tydie competed in Absolute Intense Wrestling's Jack of Trios tournament in Cleveland, Ohio representing the promotion but were defeated in the first round against Da Soul Touchaz. On July 28, 2012, CLASH sanctioned two dark matches for Dragon Gate USA's Michigan debut pay-per-view Untouchable which included J. Miller vs. Tyler Elkins and Gavin Quinn vs. Cameron Skyy vs. Dave Manzo vs. Ded Vaughn vs. Tommy Treznik in a five-way match.

On June 23, 2024, CLASH held its first livestreamed event when they partnered up with Alpha-1 Wrestling to present Battle of our Best at the Kudos Taproom and Fieldhouse in Taylor, Michigan which also featured the CLASH Championship and CLASH Women's Championship being defended during the show. On October 2, 2024, CLASH announced a partnership with Rickey Shane Page which saw the debut of Page during the promotion's Simply The Best event which streamed live on IndependentWrestling.tv. On March 21, 2026, CLASH held its first event outside the Midwest at the Lakeland Senior High School in Lakeland, Florida. During this event, Scotty 2 Hotty and his son Keagan Garland won the promotion's tag team championship in a match against The H3RD (Cameron Skyy and Tommy Treznik).

== Championships ==
Championship	Current champion(s)	Reign	Date won	Days held	Location	Event	Notes	Ref.
CLASH Championship	Juntai	1	August 23, 2024	820+	Taylor, Michigan	Homecoming		
CLASH Big League Brews Championship	Gavin Quinn	1	April 19, 2024	946+	Allen Park, Michigan	Seize The Day XIV		
CLASH Tag Team Championship	Keagan Garland and Scotty 2 Hotty	1	March 21, 2026	245+	Lakeland, Florida	Live event		
CLASH Women's Championship	Allysin Kay	1	March 26, 2023	1,336+	Allen Park, Michigan	Seize The Day 2023		
