= St. Andrews Brawl =

2011 Juggalo Championship Wrestling pay-per-view event

- The promotional poster featuring Rhino
- Promotion: Juggalo Championship Wrestling
- Date: May 4, 2011
- City: Detroit, Michigan
- Venue: St. Andrews Hall

Juggalo Championship Wrestling event chronology
← Previous; Up in Smoke	Next → The Pony Town Throwdown

St. Andrews Brawl was a professional wrestling pay-per-view (PPV) event produced by Juggalo Championship Wrestling (JCW), which was only available online. It took place on May 4, 2011 at St. Andrews Hall in Detroit, Michigan. Professional wrestling is a type of sports entertainment in which theatrical events are combined with a competitive sport. The buildup to the matches and the scenarios that took place before, during, and after the event, were planned by JCW's script writers. The event starred wrestlers from Juggalo Championship Wrestling's bi-weekly internet wrestling show.

Seven matches were held on the event's card. The main event match was a tag team match where 2 Tuff Tony and Rhino wrestled Rob Conway and Sabu to a no contest. Featured matches on the undercard included a Mask vs. Badge match in which Officer Colt Cabana defeated The Weedman, a tag team match for the JCW Tag Team Championship where that champions Ring Rydas defeated Haters, and a tag team match that saw the team of Mad Man Pondo and Necro Butcher defeat The Bumpin' Uglies to become number one contenders for the JCW Tag Team Championship.

The event was released on home video on May 6, 2011.

== Background ==
Hatchet Attacks featured professional wrestling matches that involved different wrestlers from pre-existing scripted feuds, plots, and storylines that were played at Juggalo Championship Wrestling's bi-weekly events. Wrestlers were portrayed as either a villain or a hero as they followed a series of events that built tension, and culminated into a wrestling match or series of matches. The event featured wrestlers from Juggalo Championship Wrestling's roster.

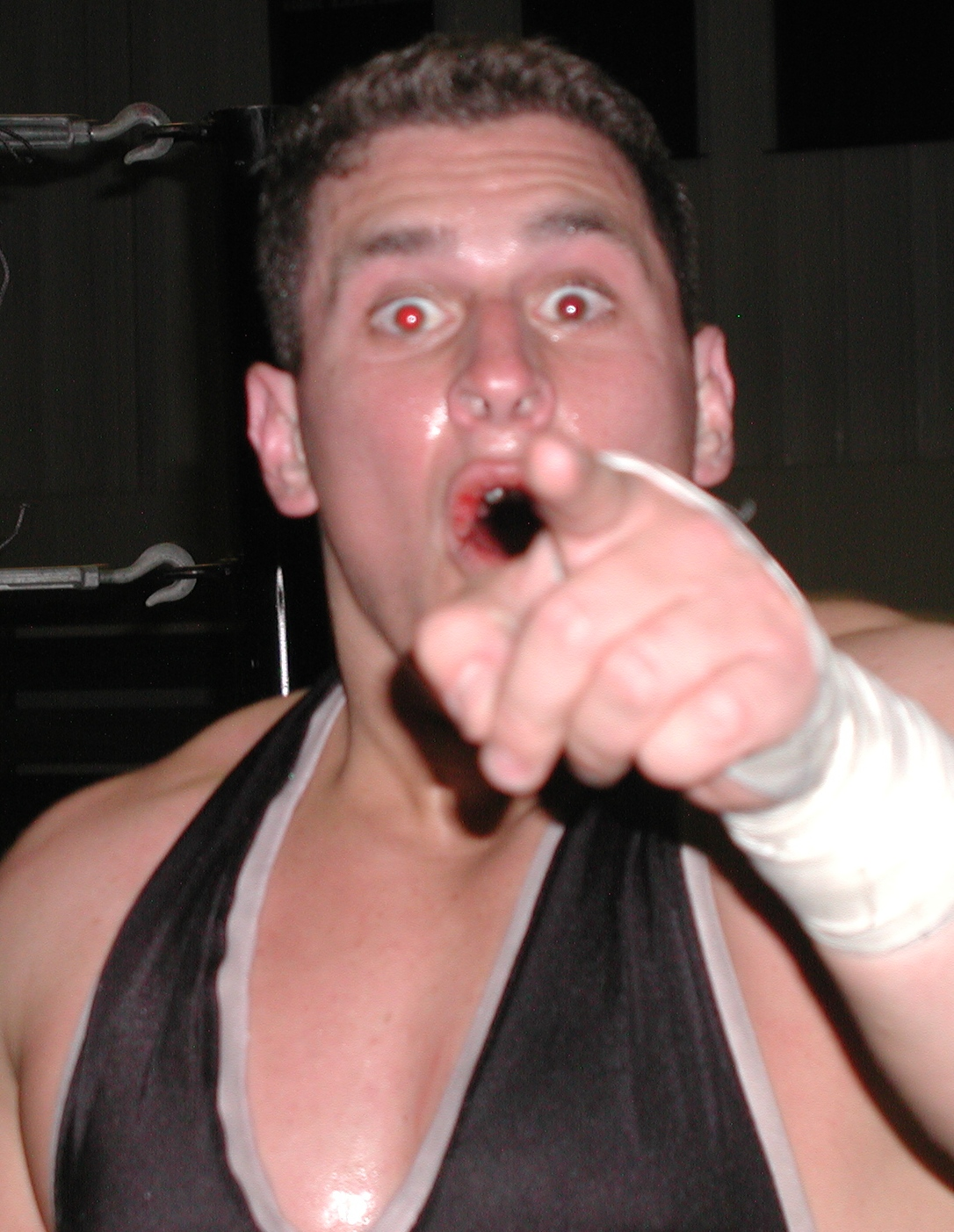
Officer Colt Cabana put his badge on the line against The Weedman

In early 2008, the Haters became involved in a rivalry with the heroic tag team Ring Rydas. The teams each won a match a piece throughout the filming of the second season of SlamTV! Disguising themselves as the Ring Rydas, the Thomaselli Brothers won the JCW Tag Team Championship at that year's Big Ballas X-Mas Party. The two teams battled again throughout the 2010 Happy Daze Tour, leading to a Fatal 4 way tag team match at Bloodymania IV where the Haters lost the championship to The Kings of Wrestling. Ring Rydas won the JCW Tag Team Championship at Up in Smoke, and a match with the Haters was scheduled for St. Andrews Brawl.

Due to The Weedman's storyline illegal use of smoking and selling marijuana, Officer Colt Cabana targeted the hero as the first offender to be brought down in an effort to keep order and force respect for the law. Cabana lost to The Weedman in his in-ring debut but attacked him after the match, delivering a Tombstone Piledriver outside of the ring. The Weedman defeated Cabana for a second time in a rematch at Bloodymania IV. After vowing to arrest one fan for every show he wrestled, Cabana defeated The Weedman at Up in Smoke. He then challenged him to a Mask vs Badge match in which if lost he would retire from the police, but if The Weedman lost he would have to unmask himself.

2 Tuff Tony first took on Sabu at the event Monster’s Island. Sabu, who recently aligned himself with villainous manager Charlie Brown, defeated Tony and continued to attack him after the match ended. At the following event, 2 Tuff Tony hired Rob Conway to attack Sabu. Tony was scheduled to wrestle Sabu again at Up in Smoke, but was attacked by Conway midway through the match. Brown revealed that he had hired Conway for the evening, and the three began kicking Tony. Rhino ran into the ring and fended off Sabu and Conway, and a tag team match was scheduled between the four men at St. Andrew's Brawl.

== Event ==
Other on-screen personnel
Role:	Name:
Disk Jockey	DJ Clay
Commentator	Kevin Gill
Commentator	Shaggy 2 Dope
Ring announcer	Legs Diamond
Referee	AT Huck
Referee	Drew Taylor
Referee	Rob Tuttle

=== Preliminary matches ===
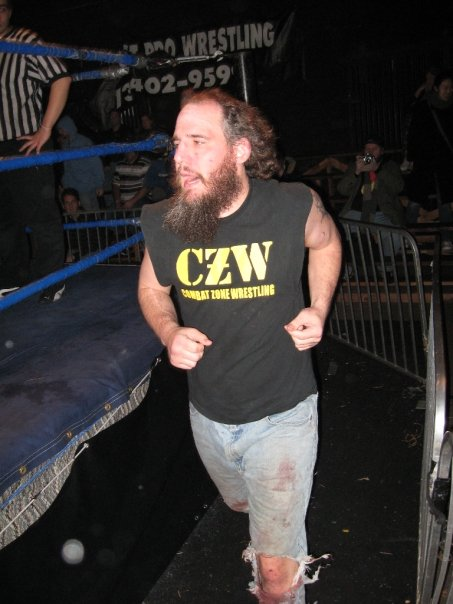
Necro Butcher won a match for the JCW Tag Team Championship with his partner Mad Man Pondo

The event opened with Isabella Smothers issuing an open challenge to all competitors. Corporal Robinson accepted her challenge and took early control in the match. Bull Pain attempted to interfere and aid Smothers, but Robinson kicked him in the jaw. After applying a cobra clutch to Smothers, Robinson hooked his foot behind her leg and threw himself backwards for the pinfall. Bill Martel faced a returning Kowabata in the next match. Martel attempted to attack Kowabata from behind, but was met with multiple karate kicks and punches. Martel gained control with several villainous attacks, then drove his knee into Kowabata's face. Kowabata kicked out of the preceding pin but Martel began celebrating, believing that he had won. Kowabata spit blue mist into Martel's eyes and gained the pinfall after the Kurt Cobain, a move in which he placed his foot under Martel's chin and fell backwards.

The Bumpin' Uglies (Josh Movado and Bubba Mackenzie) faced Mad Man Pondo and Necro Butcher for top one contendership for the JCW Tag Team Championship. As the teams brawled in the crowd, Butcher climbed to the second floor balcony and dove onto The Bumpin' Uglies, also injuring his left knee. Back in the ring, Movado performed a handspring onto Pondo. Following a series of steel chair shots, Movado jumped on top of Pondo for a pinfall that was broken up by Butcher. Necro attacked both members with a series of punches and chops, then Pondo hit Mackenzie with a stop sign. Butcher and Pondo lifted Movado to the top rope then tossed him through a table for the victory. After the match, the duo announced that they would implement their contendership after Ring Rydas lose the championship. Sexy Slim Goody faced U-Gene in the next match that was ruled a no contest after U-Gene refused to stop attacking Goody's leg with a steel chair.

The champion Ring Rydas wrestled Haters in the next match for the JCW Tag Team Championship. After Haters attacked the Rydas from behind, Vito wrapped his arm around Blue's head and fell backward. Blue stretched out of the following pin attempt and landed a standing backflip onto Vito. Vito later applied a three-quarter facelock and was flipped backward by Pauly, slamming the back of Blue's head to the mat. Ring Rydas soon gained control with a series of tag team moves and knocked the Haters out of the ring. Red then back flipped off the middle rope to the outside while Blue performed a running back flip over the ropes. Later on in the ring, Vito suplexed Blue onto Pauly's shoulders and Pauly drove him down onto his knees. Red stopped the pinfall and kicked Vito in the chin. He then turned Vito upside down while Blue jumped off the turnbuckle, driving Vito downward head-first for the victory.

The Weedman then faced Officer Colt Cabana in a Mask vs. Badge match. The Weedman threw Cabana out of the ring and performed a somersault over the ropes onto him. After later gaining control of the match, Cabana delivered a series of punches to The Weedman before attempting to remove his mask. The Weedman reversed one of Cabana's moves and performed a twisting flip onto him from the top rope. After several kicks and standing backflip onto Cabana, The Weedman climbed to the top rope. He then dove off and attempted to stomp on Cabana's chest, but Cabana kicked The Weedman in the face. Cabana then lifted the Weedman sideways by his torso and fell to his knees, slamming The Weedman down back-first for the pinfall. After the match, he presented The Weedman with an offer to keep his mask by becoming his deputy. The Weedman reluctantly agreed and was forced to arrest a fan and take him to jail, per storyline.

=== Main event matches ===
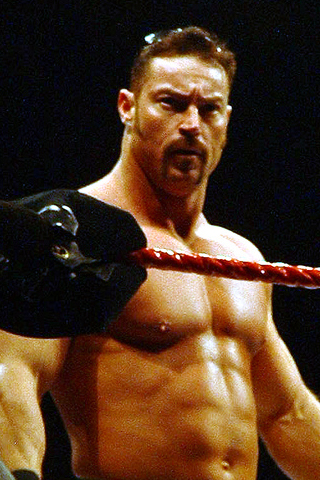
Rob Conway was hired to knock Rhino out of the match

Prior to the main event, per storyline, Sabu's manager Charlie Brown paid Rob Conway to injure Rhino. Conway knocked down Rhino early in the match, allowing Sabu to attack him with a steel chair. Sabu then applied a front facelock on Rhino and drove him face first into the chair. Later, Conway was wrestling 2 Tuff Tony when he jumped off the top rope and wrapped his leg around Tony's neck. He attempted to apply a sleeper hold, but Tony reversed it with a backflip kick. Rhino then tackled Conway but was knocked unconscious, per storyline. Conway revealed that he was wearing a metal flak jacket, thus protecting himself and injuring Rhino. Successfully completing his job, Conway demanded more money to wrestle Tony. Brown did not have the money to pay, so Conway left the match.

Sabu quickly attacked Tony with chair shots and two Arabian Skullcrushers, a move in which he delivered two leg drops with a chair to the back of Tony's head. After kicking out of the pin attempt, Tony reversed one of Sabu's moves and hit him with the chair. He lifted and slammed Sabu before hooking Sabu's leg and suplexing him onto the chair. Tony then dragged Sabu to the stage and suplexed him. As Sabu crawled back into the ring, Tony performed a diving leg drop to the back of Sabu's neck. He then placed his head between Sabu's legs, lifted him upside down, and sat down, driving Sabu's head down to the mat. Tony picked up the pinfall after hitting Sabu with two Meteorites, a move in which he lit his hand on fire and punched Sabu twice.

After the match, Butler Geves and Breyer Wellington ran into the ring and attacked Tony. Corporal Robinson and commissioner Violent J attempted to help Tony, but were attacked by Kongo Kong. Shaggy 2 Dope left the announcing table and fended off Geves, Wellington, and Kong with a steel chair. He, Tony, Robinson, and J then celebrated the victory.

== Reception and release ==
The event received generally positive reviews. Writing for PWInsider, Mat Carter considered the event "on par, if not better, than the last iPPV." While he expressed some displeasure about "the blue commentary," Carter deduced that "there are a lot worse ways to spend $5." Pro Wrestling Torch Newsletter writer Sean Radican praised the company’s creative team, writing that they "[do] a lot of things right from a storyline standpoint. The company tells logical stories that are heavy on humor and character driven wrestlers." He also complimented the "very good" production quality of the pay-per-view, but wrote that "they need to get rid of the dangerous chairshots and stunts."

St. Andrews Brawl was released on home video on May 6, 2011.

== Aftermath ==
Commissioner Violent J announced 2 Tuff Tony as the number one contender for the JCW Heavyweight Championship, and scheduled him to face the champion Butler Geeves at the next event.

== Results ==
No.	Results	Stipulations
1	Corporal Robinson defeated Isabella Smothers	Singles match
2	Kowabata defeated Bill Martel	Singles match
3	Mad Man Pondo and Necro Butcher defeated The Bumpin' Uglies	Tag team match to become #1 contender for the JCW Tag Team Championship
4	U-Gene vs. Sexy Slim Goody ended in a no contest	Singles match
5	Ring Rydas (c) defeated The Haters	Tag team match for the JCW Tag Team Championship
6	Officer Colt Cabana defeated The Weedman	Mask vs. Badge match
7	2 Tuff Tony and Rhino vs. Rob Conway and Sabu (with Charlie Brown) ended in a no contest	Tag team match
8	2 Tuff Tony defeated Sabu	Singles match
(c) / – the champion(s) heading into the match
