= F.B.I. (album) =

Studio album by the Dayton Family
- Released: October 1, 1996
- Studio: Silver Sun Studio (Flint, Michigan)
- Genre: Hip-hop; gangsta rap; horrorcore
- Length: 1:00:37
- Label: Relativity
- Producer: Steve Pitts; The Dayton Family (co.)

The Dayton Family chronology
What's on My Mind? (1995)	F.B.I. (1996)	Welcome to the Dopehouse (2002)

Professional ratings
Review scores
Source	Rating
AllMusic	4/5 stars
The Source	3/5 stars

F.B.I. is the second studio album by the American hip-hop group the Dayton Family. It was released on October 1, 1996, via Relativity Records. Recording sessions took place at Silver Sun Recording Studio in Flint. Production was handled by Steve Pitts with the members of Dayton Family serving as co-producers. It features guest appearances from Lorie Coleman, Esham, and Night & Day. Albums' title, "F.B.I." stands for "Fuck Being Indicted".

The album peaked at number 45 on the Billboard 200 albums chart and at number 7 on the Top R&B/Hip-Hop Albums chart in the United States.

The song, "Stick & Move", was originally released on the 1995 No Limit Records compilation album, Down South Hustlers: Bouncin' and Swingin'.

== Track listing ==
No.	Title	Writer(s)	Length
1.	"79th & Halstead"	Ira Dorsey; Steve Pitts	1:12
2.	"Hand That Rocks the Cradle" (featuring Night & Day)	Ira Dorsey; Raheen Petterson; Steve Pitts	4:48
3.	"F.B.I." (featuring Lorie Coleman)	Ira Dorsey; Raheen Petterson; Steve Pitts; Benjamin Latimore	5:08
4.	"Real With This"	Raheen Petterson; Ira Dorsey; Steve Pitts	4:23
5.	"Player Haters" (featuring Night & Day)	Raheen Petterson; Ira Dorsey; Esham Smith; Steve Pitts	5:38
6.	"Eyes Closed"	Raheen Petterson; Ira Dorsey; Steve Pitts	5:27
7.	"What's on My Mind II" (featuring Night & Day)	Raheen Petterson; Ira Dorsey; Erick Dorsey; Steve Pitts	4:17
8.	"Killer G's"	Ira Dorsey; Raheen Petterson; Steve Pitts	4:24
9.	"Posse Is Dayton Ave."	Raheen Petterson; Ira Dorsey; Erick Dorsey; Steve Pitts	4:56
10.	"Blood Bath"	Raheen Petterson; Ira Dorsey; Steve Pitts	4:57
11.	"Newspaper" (featuring Lorie Coleman)	Raheen Petterson; Ira Dorsey; Steve Pitts	4:45
12.	"Stick & Move" (featuring Night & Day)	Raheen Petterson; Ira Dorsey; Erick Dorsey; Steve Pitts	5:56
13.	"Ghetto" (featuring Night & Day)	Ira Dorsey; Raheen Petterson; Steve Pitts; Arnold Ingram; Marvin Willis; James Mitchell	4:46
Total length:			1:00:37

Sample credits

- Track 3 contains elements from "Let's Straighten It Out" by Latimore
- Track 4 contains elements from "Friends" by Whodini
- Track 13 contains elements from "Float On" by The Floaters

== Personnel ==
- Ira "Bootleg" Dorsey – main artist, co-producer
- Raheen "Shoestring" Peterson – main artist, co-producer
- Erick "Ghetto-E" Dorsey – main artist
- Tonyatta Martinez – featured artist (tracks: 2, 5, 7, 12, 13)
- Gasner Hughes – featured artist (tracks: 2, 5, 7, 12, 13)
- Lorie Coleman – featured artist (tracks: 3, 11)
- Esham Attica Smith – featured artist (track 5)
- Steve Pitts – producer
- Bernard Terry – mixing
- Neil Perry – engineering
- Neil Gehringer – mastering
- Bobby Russell – project coordinator
- Patrick Aquintey – design
- Christian Lantry – photography

== Chart history ==
Chart (1996)	Peak position
US Billboard 200	45
US Top R&B/Hip-Hop Albums (Billboard)	7
