= Zero Divide =

1995 video game

- European PlayStation cover art featuring the character Zero
- Developer: Zoom (Note: Ported to Windows 95 by Kinesoft)
- Publishers: List: PlayStation; JP: Zoom; NA: Time Warner Interactive; PAL: Ocean Software Windows; JP: Gamebank / CyberFront; NA: Interplay Value Products Division; EU: THQ / Rainbow Arts PlayStation 3 / PlayStation Portable; JP: Zoom
- Producer: Akira Sato
- Designer: Masakazu Fukuda
- Composers: Hideyuki Shimono; Akihito Ohkawa
- Platforms: PlayStation, PlayStation 3, PlayStation Portable, Windows 95
- Release: PlayStation: JP: August 25, 1995; NA: September 9, 1995; PAL: February 10, 1996; PlayStation 3 / PlayStation Portable: JP: April 14, 2010; Windows 95: NA: 1998 (Interplay); EU: 1999 (Rainbow Arts); JP: April 9, 1999 (CyberFront)
- Genre: Fighting
- Modes: Single-player; Multiplayer

Zero Divide (ゼロ・ディバイド) is a 1995 3D fighting video game developed by Zoom for the PlayStation, originally released in August 1995 and also as a launch title in North America. A Windows PC port was later released, subtitled Techno Warrior in North America. Zero Divide has a robot theme and features mechanics similar to its contemporary Virtua Fighter, as well as similarly polygon-based graphics. The game was popular in Japan, where it was later re-released in 2010 on newer systems through the PlayStation Network. It was followed up by a sequel, Zero Divide 2 (1997).

== Gameplay ==
PlayStation gameplay screenshot of Io vs. Cygnus

Fights take place in a non-walled battle arena, and fighters are able to hold on to the ringside before a 'ring out' may occur. Zero Divide makes use of only three buttons: kick, punch, and block. The tournament host and antagonist, XTAL, is also a sarcastic announcer throughout the game. There are many secret unlockables in the game, including a mini version of Zoom's Phalanx.

== Plot and characters ==
Set in a futuristic cyberworld, hackers led by XTAL have gotten an online security database and are threatening to make it public. They challenge the government to build robots strong enough to defeat their security forces, and these robots are dispatched on the mission to fight and eventually destroy XTAL itself.

There are eleven characters in the game, each with a specific design and symbol:

- Zero
- Cygnus
- Wild3
- Eos
- Draco
- Io
- Tau
- Nereid
- Zulu (unlockable)
- Neco (unlockable)
- XTAL (final boss)

== Development and release ==
Zero Divide was first revealed in 1994 as being a "futuristic action game" before it was reworked into a fighting game. It received much attention when it was shown and playable at the Game Expo in Japan in March 1995.

A version for Microsoft Windows was ported by Kinesoft and published by GameBank in Japan, and Interplay in the United States (titled Zero Divide: Techno Warrior). The European release also featured LAN play. In 1999, it was included in the German compilation All You Can Play: 10 Action-Games.

== Soundtrack ==
The music in the game was mostly the work of Akihito Okawa, with contributions by Hideyuki Shimono to two tracks. It is a fusion of synth with other genres. The soundtrack was released on CD in Japan by Antinos Records on May 2, 1996.

== Reception ==
Reception

Review scores
Publication	Score
AllGame	4/5
Computer and Video Games	91%
Electronic Gaming Monthly	29 / 40
Famitsu	7/10, 8/10, 7/10, 7/10
Game Informer	8.25 / 10
GameFan	282 / 300; 274 / 300
Next Generation	3/5
Dengeki PlayStation	90/100, 75/100, 80/100, 90/100
Maximum	3/5

The game sold 228,950 units in Japan and 27,049 units in the United States, for a combined 255,999 units sold in Japan and the United States.

Upon the PlayStation version's release, critics generally praised the graphics, techno soundtrack, variety of character designs, solid gameplay, and the way fighters can hang onto the edge of the ring, but criticized the difficulty in executing special moves and felt that some opponents were overpowered. They also noted similarities to the gameplay mechanics of the Virtua Fighter series.

GameFan called Zero Divide "one of the best 3-D fighting games of all time" and praised "innovative little extras like dangling off the side of the ring and the transparent limb effect" as well as the Tiny Phalanx shoot 'em up minigame, concluding Zero Divide "to be one of the best designed, programmed, and tweaked fighting games yet." Next Generation remarked that while having android characters is innovative, the characters are generally so bizarre that they are difficult to identify with, and their generic move sets fail to justify their "outlandish" designs. Game Informer said it "has everything you would expect from a next generation fighter, lots of action, fast moving polygon fighters, tons of moves, and most importantly solid game mechanics."

Computer and Video Games stated that it is "in some ways even better" than the original Virtua Fighter and offers "serious competition" against Tekken, saying that Zero Divide is "better looking" and "more intuitive", making Battle Arena Toshinden's "flash veneer obsolete", and concluding it to be "a stunning, finely-tuned game". GamePro concluded, "Although it lacks the solid fighting foundation that would make it great, Zero Divide has moments of greatness." The four reviewers of Electronic Gaming Monthly scored it 29 out of 40 (7.25 out of 10 average), saying it "grows on you." Maximum gave it three out of five stars, calling it "an average beat 'em up destined to be ignored by discerning PlayStation owners."

Next Generation reviewed the PlayStation version of the game, and stated that "It's easy to see the attraction. The character control well, combinations come naturally, and it's smoothly animated, close to PlayStation standards set by Battle Arena Toshinden (although not up to the super-fluidity of Virtua Fighter 2)."

== Sequels ==
Zero Divide 2 was released for PlayStation on June 27, 1997, developed and published by Zoom. Sony Computer Entertainment published Zero Divide 2 in Europe in 1998. No company expressed interest in publishing the game in North America. Zero Divide: The Final Conflict was released for Sega Saturn on November 20, 1997 in Japan only, again developed and published by Zoom.

== See also ==
- Phalanx (video game)
- List of PSone Classics (Japan)
