= Taylor Town Trade Center =

Shopping and convention center located in Taylor, Michigan

General information
- Type: Shopping center, convention and events center, and flea market
- Location: Taylor, Michigan, 22525 Ecorse Road
- Coordinates: 42°15′16″N 83°15′23″W
- Opening: 1960
- Owner: Essco Development

The Taylor Town Trade Center, also known as the Taylortown Shopping Center, is a shopping center, flea market, and events center located in Taylor, Michigan. Current tenants include Ace Hardware and Family Dollar.

== History ==
The shopping center originally opened as the Green Center in the early 1960s before renaming to Taylortown Shopping Center a few years later. The complex was Taylor's largest shopping center until the opening of Southland Center in 1970. Following a period of decline in the 1990s, the shopping center experienced a resurgence following the opening of the Taylor Town Trade Center flea market and expo center. On February 20, 2010 the expo center hosted Chikara's first professional wrestling event in the state of Michigan when they teamed up with CLASH Wrestling to present The Great Aggression: CLASH vs. Chikara. On June 5, 2012, the expo center hosted Juggalo Championship Wrestling's Road to Bloodymania 6 pay-per-view. Following the closure of the Gibraltar Trade Center in 2014, several trade shows relocated to the Taylor Town Trade Center.
