= Flag to Flag =

1999 video game

- North American box art
- Developer: ZOOM Inc.
- Publisher: Sega (Note: Released under the Sega Sports banner.)
- Director: Masakazu Fukuda
- Producer: Takashi Uryu
- Composers: Akihito Okawa; Houzou Okazaki
- Platform: Dreamcast
- Release: JP: March 25, 1999; NA: September 9, 1999
- Genre: Racing
- Modes: Single-player, multiplayer

CART: Flag to Flag, known as Super Speed Racing (スーパースピードレーシング, Sūpā Supīdo Rēshingu) in Japan, is a 1999 racing video game developed by ZOOM Inc. and published by Sega for the Dreamcast.

== Gameplay ==
Flag to Flag is officially licensed by the Championship Auto Racing Teams (CART) racing league. It is based on the 1998 CART FedEx Championship Series. The game contains the 19 race tracks, 27 drivers, and 18 teams that were used in the 1998 CART Season.

=== Tracks ===
Round	Map	Track name	Location	Length	Type	Date
1		Miami	Homestead, Florida, United States	2.414 km (1.500 mi)	Oval	March 15, 1998
2		Motegi	Motegi, Japan	2.492 km (1.548 mi)	Oval	March 28, 1998
3		Long Beach	Long Beach, California, United States	2.552 km (1.586 mi)	Street Circuit	April 5, 1998
4		Nazareth	Nazareth, Pennsylvania, United States	1.522 km (0.946 mi)	Oval	April 26, 1998
5		Rio de Janeiro	Jacarepaguá, Rio de Janeiro, Brazil	2.970 km (1.845 mi)	Oval	May 10, 1998
6		Gateway Int'l	Madison, Illinois, United States	2.043 km (1.269 mi)	Oval	May 23, 1998
7		Milwaukee Mile	West Allis, Wisconsin, United States	1.660 km (1.031 mi)	Oval	May 31, 1998
8		Detroit	Detroit, Michigan, United States	3.799 km (2.361 mi)	Street Circuit	June 7, 1998
9		Portland	Portland, Oregon, United States	3.166 km (1.967 mi)	Road Course	June 21, 1998
10		Cleveland	Cleveland, Ohio, United States	3.389 km (2.106 mi)	Temporary Road Course	July 12, 1998
11		Toronto	Toronto, Ontario, Canada	2.824 km (1.755 mi)	Street Circuit	July 19, 1998
12		Michigan	Brooklyn, Michigan, United States	3.218 km (2.000 mi)	Oval	July 26, 1998
13		Mid-Ohio	Lexington, Ohio, United States	3.634 km (2.258 mi)	Road Course	August 9, 1998
14		Road America	Elkhart Lake, Wisconsin, United States	6.514 km (4.048 mi)	Road Course	August 16, 1998
15		Vancouver	Vancouver, British Columbia, Canada	2.900 km (1.802 mi)	Street Course	September 6, 1998
16		Laguna Seca	Monterey, California, United States	3.601 km (2.238 mi)	Road Course	September 13, 1998
17		Houston	Houston, Texas, United States	2.704 km (1.680 mi)	Street Course	October 4, 1998
18		Gold Coast	Gold Coast, Queensland, Australia	4.496 km (2.794 mi)	Street Course	October 18, 1998
19		Fontana	Fontana, California, United States	3.218 km (2.000 mi)	Oval	November 1, 1998

== Reception ==
Reception

Aggregate score
Aggregator	Score
GameRankings	62%

Review scores
Publication	Score
AllGame	3/5
Edge	4/10
Electronic Gaming Monthly	6/10
Famitsu	27/40
Game Informer	4.5/10
GamePro	3/5
GameRevolution	C
GameSpot	6.1/10
GameSpy	6.5/10
IGN	8.2/10
Next Generation	3/5

The game received "mixed" reviews according to the review aggregation website GameRankings. Jeff Lundrigan of NextGen called it a "competent" racing title, but nothing more than what racing fans would expect. In Japan, Famitsu gave it a score of 27 out of 40.
