= Phalanx (video game) =

1991 video game

- X68000 cover art by Yoshiyuki Takani
- Developers: ZOOM Inc. (X68000); Kemco (SNES, GBA)
- Publishers: ZOOM Inc. (X68000); Kemco (SNES, GBA)
- Composers: S. Yamaguchi (SNES); Tsukasa Masuko (GBA)
- Platforms: X68000, Super NES, Game Boy Advance, WiiWare
- Release: X68000: JP: May 17, 1991; SNES: JP: August 7, 1992; NA: October 1992; EU: 1992; GBA: JP: October 26, 2001; EU: November 23, 2001; NA: December 27, 2001; WiiWare: JP: December 22, 2009
- Genre: Scrolling shooter
- Mode: Single-player

Phalanx (full title: Phalanx: The Enforce Fighter A-144) is a 1991 horizontally scrolling shooter developed by ZOOM Inc. and Kemco for the X68000, Super Nintendo Entertainment System, and Game Boy Advance. The game was released for the X68000 in Japan in 1991, for the Super NES in Japan on August 7, 1992, in North America in October and in the same year in Europe, as well as for the Game Boy Advance in 2001 in Japan on October 26, in Europe on November 23, and in North America on December 27.

Phalanx is infamous for the incongruous box art in its American release: it displays a bearded, elderly man dressed in overalls, wearing a fedora and playing a banjo while a futuristic spaceship flies in the background. The popular media site IGN named it their fifth "Most Awesome Cover" in a top 25 countdown on their website. The advertising company responsible for the box art later admitted that they had deliberately chosen this theme in order to attract the customer with something original, considering there were many space shooters in the market that looked alike. The Game Boy Advance release used a redesigned cover with a prominent image of a spaceship.

A "mini" version called Tiny Phalanx was featured in the 1995 fighting game Zero Divide.

== Gameplay ==
The player's ship can switch to three different speed levels at any time, allowing the player to move fast to avoid enemies and obstacles entirely, or slow down to weave between enemy bullets. An unusual addition for a shooter at the time is the ability for the player's ship to take multiple hits before losing a life: the Phalanx had three hit points which could be restored by a certain power-up, which is important as health is persistent between levels. A variety of weapons can be picked up from items that certain enemies leave behind, and up to three can be stored at a time; further weapons replace the currently equipped weapon when acquired. The player can switch between these weapons freely, and sacrifice a weapon to produce a "smart bomb" effect, freeing up the slot to grab another weapon without waste. The Extent was set at every 300,000 points. Difficulty can be adjusted between three levels in the options menu (unavailable during play), and primarily affects the number of bullets fired by enemies; a hidden "Funny" difficulty is available through the use of cheat codes, and escalates the game's difficulty dramatically.

=== Weapons and Items ===
L – Laser: Equips the ship with two stationary options, respectively above and below the ship, while changing the ship's attack to a piercing laser beam. Successive upgrades cause the options to fire beams as well, fore and aft, while increasing the beams' power. Its Smart Bomb attack causes the ship to spin rapidly, firing powerful bullets outward in a spiral pattern, while rendering the ship invulnerable.

H – Homing: Equips the ship with two options which orbit clockwise around the ship, while changing the ship's main weapon to a homing ball of energy. Upgrading causes the options to fire their own homing balls, and increases their power. Its Smart Bomb attack is a ball of energy that surrounds the ship, negating all damage and causing heavy damage to any enemy touched by the energy field.

E – Energizer: A charge weapon which fires energy bolts; charging increases the size and number of bolts fired; upgrades improve the maximum charge level. Its Smart Bomb attack is a full-screen antimatter reaction which causes continual damage to all visible enemies.

R – Ricochet: Equips the ship with two options which orbit the ship in opposing directions, while changing the ship's attack to a green ball of energy. Upgrading causes the options to fire similar balls of energy forward diagonally up and down, which bounce off flat walls or ceilings, and increases overall damage. Its Smart Bomb attack combines the two options into a single homing drone which engages enemies at melee range, killing them before seeking a new target. Unlike other Smart Bomb attacks, the ship remains vulnerable during this attack; additionally, the drone will frequently seek out invulnerable portions of enemies to attack, reducing its usefulness against bosses.

A – A-Type Missile: A standard side-weapon which launches homing missiles that detonate on impact.

B – B-Type Missile: A standard side-weapon which launches forward firing rockets that do not detonate, and damage all enemies along their path.

C – C-Type Missile: A standard side-weapon which launches guided missiles, mimicking the A-144's vertical movement as they fly forward, that detonate on impact.

P – Power-Capsule: The game's combination healing and weapon enhancement power-up; simultaneously upgrades weapons systems by one level, and heals one point of ship health.

== Plot ==
Taking place in the year 2279, a planetary research project is sent into the depths of space. One particular group of researchers lands on and partly colonizes the alien planet Delia. Sometime after their stay, an emergency transmission is sent from Delia to their security force orbiting the planet. The only clue they are given is a message regarding a hazardous leak. The planet's space fighters had become possessed by an unknown space squadron of alien bioships that appear out of nowhere and soon make themselves a hostile threat among the possessed fighters. The player assumes the role of Wink Baufield (named Rick in the Game Boy Advance version), an ace pilot assigned to investigate the disaster and possibly discover what is invading Delia in the assignment Operation Climax in the experimental space fighter the A/144 Phalanx.

== Release ==
North American Super NES cover art featuring Bertil Valley

The unusual SNES box art for the US release, featuring an elderly man (played by Bertil Valley, 1913–2004, who was also known for playing a mall Santa for 25 years of his life) playing a banjo has been cited in examples of bizarre video game box art. In an interview with Destructoid, Matt Guss, an advertiser who worked on Phalanx's cover, stated that the idea for the art came from coworker Keith Campbell. Campbell, who didn't find anything in Phalanx that stood out, decided to make the packaging eye-catching, hoping a potential buyer would stare at the box art and wonder "what just happened". The box art itself has been described by Destructoid's Allastair Pinsoff as "goofy and misleading" and by ScreenRant's Ryan Lynch as "the most surreal video game box art of all time".

== Reception ==
Reception

Aggregate scores
Aggregator	Score	
Aggregator	GBA	SNES
GameRankings	71.33%	N/A
Metacritic	71/100	N/A

Review scores
Publication	Score	
Publication	GBA	SNES
Famitsu	26/40	19/40
Game Informer	5/10	N/A
GameFan	N/A	89%, 87%
GamePro	4/5	N/A
GameSpot	7.8/10	N/A
GameSpy	75/100	N/A
GameZone	9/10	N/A
Super Play	N/A	70%
Total!	N/A	59%
Control	N/A	73%
Marukatsu Super Famicom	N/A	7/10, 7/10, 5/10, 7/10
N-Force	N/A	74%
SNES Force	N/A	74%
Super Action	N/A	84%
The Super Famicom	N/A	65/100
Super Pro	N/A	67/100
Play	3/5	N/A

The Japanese publication Micom BASIC Magazine ranked Phalanx fourth in popularity in its August 1991 issue. Zenji Nishkawa of Oh!X praised the game for its overall audiovisual department. Technopolis also highlighted the game's graphics and sound but noted that it was difficult. Hardcore Gaming 101's Chris Rasa wrote that it was "a very solid horizontal shooter that doesn't do anything new, but also does everything well".

=== Super NES ===
Phalanx received a 21.45/30 score in a 1993 readers' poll conducted by Super Famicom Magazine, ranking among Super Famicom titles at the number 106 spot. The Super NES version was met with average reviews. SNES Force commended the game's sharp graphics, but were critical to its "frustrating" gameplay.

=== GBA ===
The Game Boy Advance version received "mixed or average" reviews, holding a rating of 71.33% based on nine reviews according to review aggregators Metacritic and GameRankings.
