= Welcome to the Dopehouse =

Studio album by the Dayton Family
- Released: May 21, 2002
- Genre: Hip hop; gangsta rap
- Length: 53:56
- Label: Koch Records
- Producer: Steve Pitts; Gee Pierce

The Dayton Family chronology
F.B.I. (Fuck Being Indicted) (1996)	Welcome to the Dopehouse (2002)	Family Feud (2005)

Professional ratings
Review scores
Source	Rating
AllMusic	3/5 stars
RapReviews	4.5/10
The Source	3/5 stars

Welcome to the Dopehouse is the third studio album by American hip-hop group the Dayton Family. It was released on May 21, 2002, via Koch Records. The album peaked at number 107 on the Billboard 200 albums chart and at number 20 on the Top R&B/Hip-Hop Albums chart in the United States.

== Track listing ==
All lyrics are written by Ira Dorsey & Raheen Peterson, except track 7 by Teena Marie; all music is composed by Steve Pitts, except track 12 by Gee Pierce.

No.	Title	Length
1.	"Intro"	1:33
2.	"Big Mac 11"	4:35
3.	"Do You Remember"	3:20
4.	"Welcome to Flint"	3:47
5.	"Feds"	3:56
6.	"Gangstarism" (featuring Goldfish)	4:11
7.	"Young Thugs" (featuring Ghetto-E & Lori)	4:01
8.	"Drugstore"	3:27
9.	"Set Up"	4:16
10.	"We Kept It Ghetto"	3:19
11.	"Dope House"	3:51
12.	"Shadows" (featuring Kalonda & Ryan)	4:01
13.	"Outlaws"	3:46
14.	"Weed Song"	3:48
15.	"Simple Wish"	3:26
16.	"Outro"	1:36
Total length:		53:56

== Personnel ==
- Ira "Bootleg" Dorsey – main artist
- Raheen "Shoestring" Peterson – main artist
- Brian Goldfish – featured artist (track 6)
- Lori – featured artist (track 7)
- Erick "Ghetto-E" Dorsey – featured artist (track 7)
- Kalonda – featured artist (track 12)
- Ryan – featured artist (track 12)
- Steve Pitts – producer (tracks: 1–11, 13–16)
- Gee Pierce – producer (track 12), engineering
- Bernard Terry – mixing
- Jeff Chenault – art direction & design

== Chart history ==
Chart (2002)	Peak position
US Billboard 200	107
US Top R&B/Hip-Hop Albums (Billboard)	20
US Independent Albums (Billboard)	6
