= Hatchet Attacks (2011) =

2011 professional wrestling event and concert

- Promotional poster featuring the artists of Psychopathic Records and Hatchet House
- Promotion: Juggalo Championship Wrestling
- Date: March 26, 2011
- City: Milwaukee, Wisconsin
- Venue: The Rave
- Attendance: 4,311

Pay-per-view chronology
← Previous; First	Next → Lights, Camera, Bash 'Em

Hatchet Attacks chronology
← Previous; 2009	Next → 2012

Hatchet Attacks (2011) was a professional wrestling and concert pay-per-view (PPV) event produced by Juggalo Championship Wrestling (JCW) and its parent company Psychopathic Records. It took place on March 26, 2011, at The Rave in Milwaukee, Wisconsin and was streamed live and exclusively online via. The Rave's website. Professional wrestling is a type of sports entertainment in which theatrical events are combined with a competitive sport. The buildup to the matches and the scenarios that took place before, during, and after the event, were planned by JCW's script writers. The event starred wrestlers from Juggalo Championship Wrestling's bi-weekly internet wrestling show.

Seven matches were held on the event's card. The main event match was a Barbed wire, Tables, Ladders, and Glass match for the JCW Heavyweight Championship where the champion Corporal Robinson defeated Ian Rotten. Featured matches on the undercard included a singles match in which Kongo Kong defeated Vampiro, a tag team match for the JCW Tag Team Championship that saw the champions Mad Man Pondo and Necro Butcher defeat the Haters, and an 8-man Tag Team match where The Weedman, 2 Tuff Tony, Jailbird Man, and Rhino defeated the team of Baby Bitch Boy, The Bumpin' Uglies, and Bull Pain.

In addition to the pro wrestling show, performances from DJ Clay, Anybody Killa, The Dayton Family, Boondox, Mike E. Clark, Axe Murder Boyz, Twiztid, and the Insane Clown Posse took place during the event.

The event filled the venue to its capacity with an attendance of 4,311. It was Juggalo Championship Wrestling's first event to be shown as an internet pay-per-view (iPPV) and the first to be aired live. Following the success of Hatchet Attacks, Psychopathic Records launched its own broadcast website and began streaming all of its events on iPPV.

== Background ==
Hatchet Attacks featured professional wrestling matches that involved different wrestlers from pre-existing scripted feuds, plots, and storylines that were played at Juggalo Championship Wrestling's bi-weekly events. Wrestlers were portrayed as either a villain or a hero as they followed a series of events that built tension, and culminated into a wrestling match or series of matches. The event featured wrestlers from Juggalo Championship Wrestling's roster.

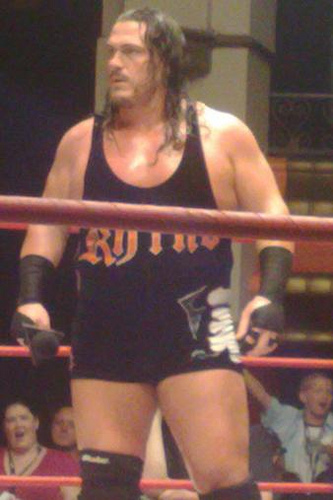
Rhino returned to Juggalo Championship Wrestling at Monster’s Island

In 2007, Bull Pain attacked hero 2 Tuff Tony at East Side Wars. For the next several years, Pain continued to beat opponents mercilessly using a metal baseball bat he called Brother Pain. The tag team The Bumpin' Uglies followed Pain's path and began fighting with multiple heroes of the company throughout early 2011. 2 Tuff Tony, The Weedman, and Jailbird Man all individually wrestled Pain, The Bumpin' Uglies, and Baby Bitch Boy at Juggalo Championship Wrestling's bi-weekly events. Following Rhino's return to the company at Monster’s Island, an eight-man tag team match was booked for Hatchet Attacks with The Weedman, 2 Tuff Tony, Jailbird Man, and Rhino facing Baby Bitch Boy, The Bumpin' Uglies, and Bull Pain.

Villainous tag team the Haters lost to fan favorites Mad Man Pondo and Necro Butcher in a hard hitting match at Cold Winter Fights. The two teams fought again at Flashlight Hysteria, where the Haters handcuffed Mad Man Pondo to the outside of the ring and proceeded to assault Necro Butcher. Later that night, the Haters won an 8 team battle royal to become the JCW Tag Team Champions. Pondo and Butcher defeated the Haters for the championship at the following event, leading the Haters to announce that they would invoke their rematch clause at Hatchet Attacks.

Kongo Kong debuted in Juggalo Championship Wrestling at 2010's Violent Night. In the following months, Kong mercilessly dominated opponents with his strength. At Hardcore Hell, he interfered in a match and attacked the tag teams the Ring Rydas and The Bumpin’ Uglies. His handler Truth Martini voiced Kong's aggravation about not having a match for two straight events. Commissioner Violent J then scheduled a match for Kong at the following event, called Monster’s Island, against Vampiro. Kong defeated Vampiro at the event after Raven interfered in the match. A rematch was scheduled for Hatchet Attacks.

JCW Heavyweight champion Corporal Robinson and 2 Tuff Tony defeated the team of Breyer Wellington and Butler Jeeves at JCW Tag Team Tournament. Two weeks later, Robinson was eliminated from an 8 team battle royal when Wellington interfered in the match. The two men were scheduled to fight at Hardcore Hell, but Wellington announced that he had paid Ian Rotten to take his place. A rematch was scheduled for the next event after Robinson defeated Rotten, but Wellington again hired a replacement. It was then announced that Wellington would face Robinson for the championship at Hatchet Attacks in a match where Barbed wire, Tables, Ladders, and Glass are all legal.

== Event ==
Other on-screen personnel
Role:	Name:
Disk Jockey	DJ Clay
Commentator	Kevin Gill
Commentator	Scott D'Amore
Ring announcer	Legs Diamond
Referee	AT Huck
Referee	Drew Taylor
Referee	Rob Tuttle

=== Preliminary matches ===
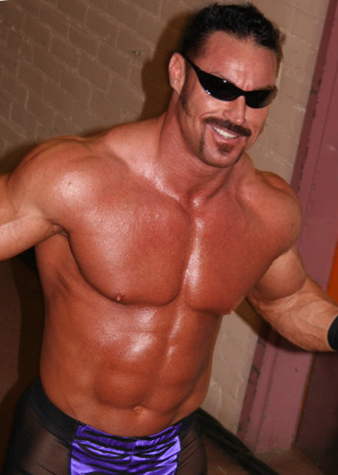
Rob Conway participated in the opening match of the night

In the opening match, Rob Conway faced Sal the Man of a Thousand Gimmicks. Conway gained a quick victory after he applied a Crucifix armbar, causing Sal to submit. The competitors legitimately damaged the ring during the match, resulting in a 45-minute intermission while it was fixed. The team of Train Wreck and Bill Martel controlled Ring Rydas throughout most of the next match. The finish saw Ring Ryda Red land a diving frog splash on Wreck for the victory. Raven was accompanied to the ring by Sexy Slim Goody in the third match. Goody attempted to interfere during the match, but Raven accidentally ran into him. U-Gene then applied a front facelock to both men and jumped down onto his back, driving their faces into the mat for the win.

Commentator Kevin Gill then conducted an interview Breyer Wellington about his match against JCW Heavyweight champion Corporal Robinson later that night. Wellington informed Gill that he had, once again, hired Ian Rotten to take his place and deliver him the championship. In the following match, The Weedman, 2 Tuff Tony, Jailbird Man, and Rhino faced the team of Baby Bitch Boy, The Bumpin' Uglies, and Bull Pain. A fast-paced battle between the two teams, the end saw Tony light his hand on fire and punch one member of The Bumpin’ Uglies in the face while Rhino tackled the other for the pinfall.

The Haters faced Mad Man Pondo and Necro Butcher in the next match. Utilizing a steel chair, The Haters suplexed Pondo then drove his face into the it. Following a series of double team moves, Pauly performed a running backflip splash and attempted a pinfall. After he kicked out, Vito lifted Pondo onto his shoulders and slammed him onto the mat before Pauly performed a diving front flip splash for another two count. As Pauly climbed to the ropes again, Necro Butcher hit him with a chair then wrapped his legs around Pauly's head before flipping him to the mat back first. Pondo hit Pauly in the head with a stop sign while Necro climbed to the top rope, lifted Vito up over his shoulder and fell forward, slamming him back first through a table for the victory.

Kongo Kong took early control of Vampiro in the final preliminary match of the night. He landed a front flip splash onto a seated Vampiro and went for a pinfall, but lifted Vampiro's head after a two count. Kong followed with a leg drop and headbutts before missing a body splash in the corner, propelling him outside of the ring. After the two brawled on the outside, Kong dragged Vampiro back in and performed a sitout swinging side slam, a move in which he lifted Vampiro and spun in a circle before sitting down and slamming Vampiro back-first into the mat. Following interference by Kong's manager Truth Martini, Kong lifted Vampiro by his neck then sat down while slamming Vampiro's back to the mat for the pinfall.

=== Main event matches ===
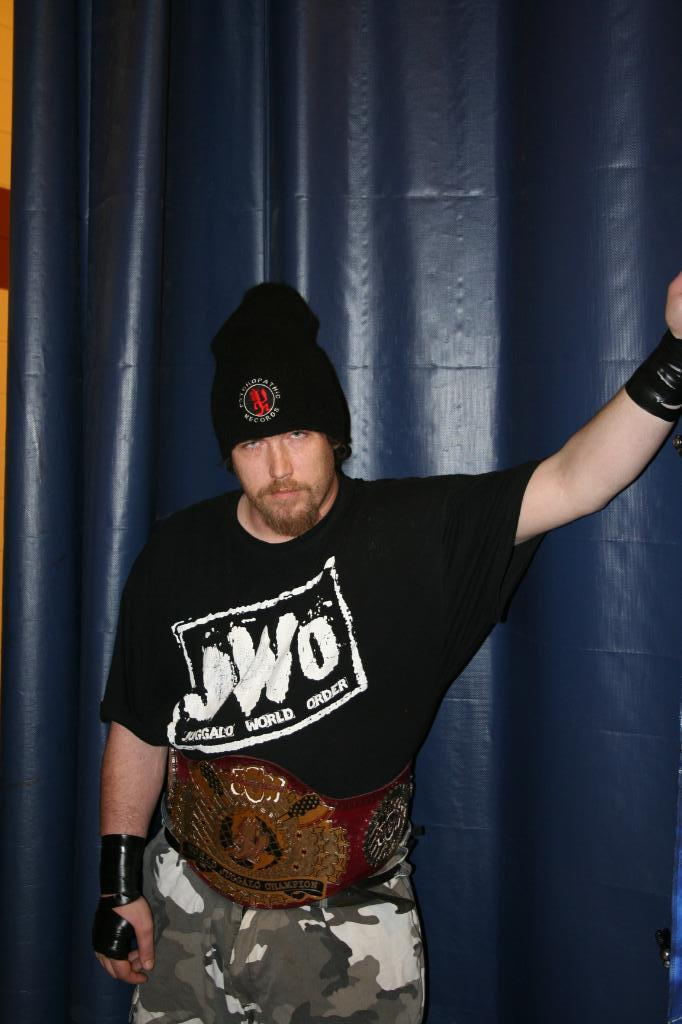
Corporal Robinson as JCW Heavyweight Champion

The main event of the night was a Barbed wire, Tables, Ladders, and Glass match for the JCW Heavyweight Championship. Corporal Robinson began by breaking several light tubes in Ian Rotten's face with a kick. Rotten later countered Robinson and applied a tarantula, a move in which he positioned his legs under Robinson's arms while draping over the top rope then pulled on Robinson's ankles. Rotten continued his attack by stabbing Robinson with a piece of broken light tube, breaking more tubes in his face, then hitting him with a baseball bat covered in barbed wire. After an exchange of punches and headbutts, Rotten lifted Robinson onto his shoulders and slammed him through light tubes. He then climbed a ladder and jumped, driving his knee into more tubes on Robinson's chest. Rotten climbed the ladder a second time, but Robinson followed and applied a cobra clutch. He then hooked his foot behind Rotten's leg and threw himself backwards, forcing Rotten off the ladder and through light tubes positioned between two steel chairs for the pinfall.

After the match ended, Breyer Wellington and Butler Jeeves ran into the ring and attacked Robinson. As they continued to kick him in the corner, Vampiro ran out from backstage and chased them away. He grabbed a microphone and began to praise Robinson as both a friend and a champion. Vampiro then spoke about his own thirty-year career, 24 world heavyweight championship reigns, and recent retirement. He paused before informing Robinson that he came out of retirement for only one reason; to win back the JCW Heavyweight Championship.

== Reception ==
Although the pay-per-view yielded minimal reviews, it was well received. James Sheringham of ThePowerBomb wrote that while his "previous experience with ROH and DGUSA [internet pay-per-views] has been mixed, from overlong shows to technical difficulties … [Hatchet Attacks’ stream ran] perfectly 99.9% of the time." Sheringham praised the length of the event, calling it "spot on," and wrote that "everything built to the main event, and this meant the crowd (and myself) didn’t get burnt out." He also praised Kevin Gill's commentary, writing that Gill "was really passionate [and] did a great job hyping what was coming up."

== Aftermath ==
The Weedman defeated Bull Pain at the following week's event Lights, Camera, Bash'em!. After the match, per storyline, The Weedman was attacked and arrested by Officer Cabana. Later that night, the team of Corporal Robinson, 2 Tuff Tony, and Rhino defeated The Haters and Breyer Wellington. Following the victory, commissioner Violent J scheduled a match between Robinson and Wellington at the next event, Up in Smoke.

== Results ==
No.	Results	Stipulations
1	Rob Conway defeated Sal the Man of a Thousand Gimmicks	Singles match
2	The Ring Rydas defeated Bill Martel and Train Wreck	Tag team match
3	U-Gene defeated Raven (with Sexy Slim Goody)	Singles match
4	The Weedman, 2 Tuff Tony, Jailbird Man, and Rhino defeated Baby Bitch Boy, The Bumpin' Uglies, and Bull Pain (with Isabella Smothers)	Eight-man tag team match
5	Mad Man Pondo and Necro Butcher (c) defeated The Haters	Tag team match for the JCW Tag Team Championship
6	Kongo Kong (with Truth Martini) defeated Vampiro	Singles match
7	Corporal Robinson (c) defeated Ian Rotten	Barbed wire, Tables, Ladders, and Glass match for the JCW Heavyweight Championship
(c) / – the champion(s) heading into the match

== Music performers ==
- Anybody Killa
- Axe Murder Boyz
- Boondox
- DJ Clay
- The Dayton Family
- Mike E. Clark
- Twiztid
- Insane Clown Posse
