= Scotty 2 Hotty =

American professional wrestler

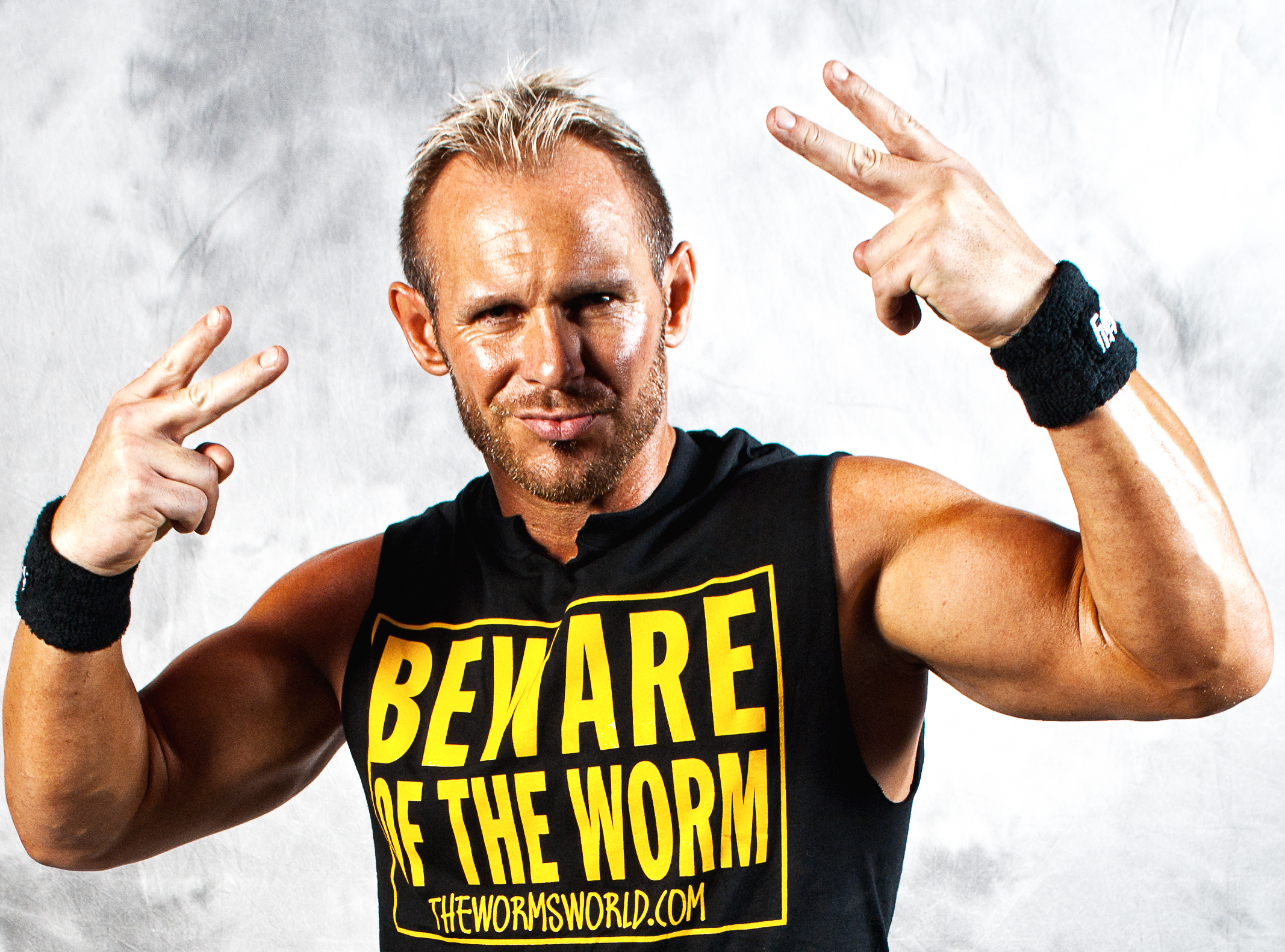
- Garland in 2010

Personal information
- Born: Scott Ronald Garland; July 2, 1973 (age 53) Westbrook, Maine, U.S.
- Children: 2

Professional wrestling career
- Ring name(s): Scott Garland; Scott Taylor; Scotty 2 Hotty; Skippy Taylor; Too Hot
- Billed height: 5 ft 9 in (175 cm)
- Billed weight: 220 lb (100 kg)
- Billed from: Westbrook, Maine
- Debut: 1989

Scott Ronald Garland (born July 2, 1973) is an American professional wrestler signed to All Elite Wrestling as a producer and coach. He is best known for his appearances with the World Wrestling Federation/Entertainment (WWE) under the ring names "Too Hot" Scott Taylor (1991–1999) and Scotty 2 Hotty (1999–2007). During his WWE career, Garland held the WWF World Tag Team Championship, WWE Tag Team Championship and WWF Light Heavyweight Championship.

== Professional wrestling career ==
=== Early career (1989–1997) ===
At approximately 14 or 15 years old, Garland wrote to Sue Aitchison, the Community Relations Specialist of the World Wrestling Federation, inquiring from which professional wrestling school the company recruited the majority of their employees. Aitchison responded by telling him that they did not recruit from any particular school and wished him luck. Garland then attempted to call Vince McMahon, but was unable to speak to McMahon directly.

Garland began attending shows at the Cumberland County Civic Center in Portland, Maine, helping the ring crew to construct the wrestling ring. After an independent promoter saw Garland wrestling with his friends, he offered Garland a job. In his first match, Garland wrestled Steve Ramsey in a Portland armory on November 23, 1989, the same night the Survivor Series was taking place. In the same year, Garland began wrestling for the Massachusetts-based New England Wrestling.

In August 1991, Garland was introduced to the WWF by fellow NEW wrestler Phil Apollo. Garland made his first appearance with the World Wrestling Federation in October 1991 while still a junior in high school, teaming with Sonny Blaze and using the ring name "Scott Taylor". Garland appeared sporadically with the WWF as an enhancement talent over the next six years, losing to wrestlers such as The Berzerker, Yokozuna and The Ringmaster.

Garland continued to attend college throughout his early tenure, and in 1994, he supplemented his income by working as a Fleet Bank bank teller and as the assistant manager of a Spencer's Gifts outlet.

Garland made two appearances for Extreme Championship Wrestling (ECW) in February 1997, losing both matches to Taz.

=== World Wrestling Federation/Entertainment (1997–2007) ===
==== Light heavyweight division (1997–1998) ====
In 1997, Garland, now working for insurance company Unum, planned to wrestle tryout matches for Extreme Championship Wrestling. Upon hearing of his plans, President of the WWF Talent Relations Bruce Prichard signed him to a contract. Garland began wrestling in the Light Heavyweight division as Scott Taylor. In late 1997, he took part in an eight-man tournament for the vacant WWF Light Heavyweight Championship, but was eliminated in the second round after being chokeslammed by Kane.

==== Too Much/Too Cool (1998–2001) ====
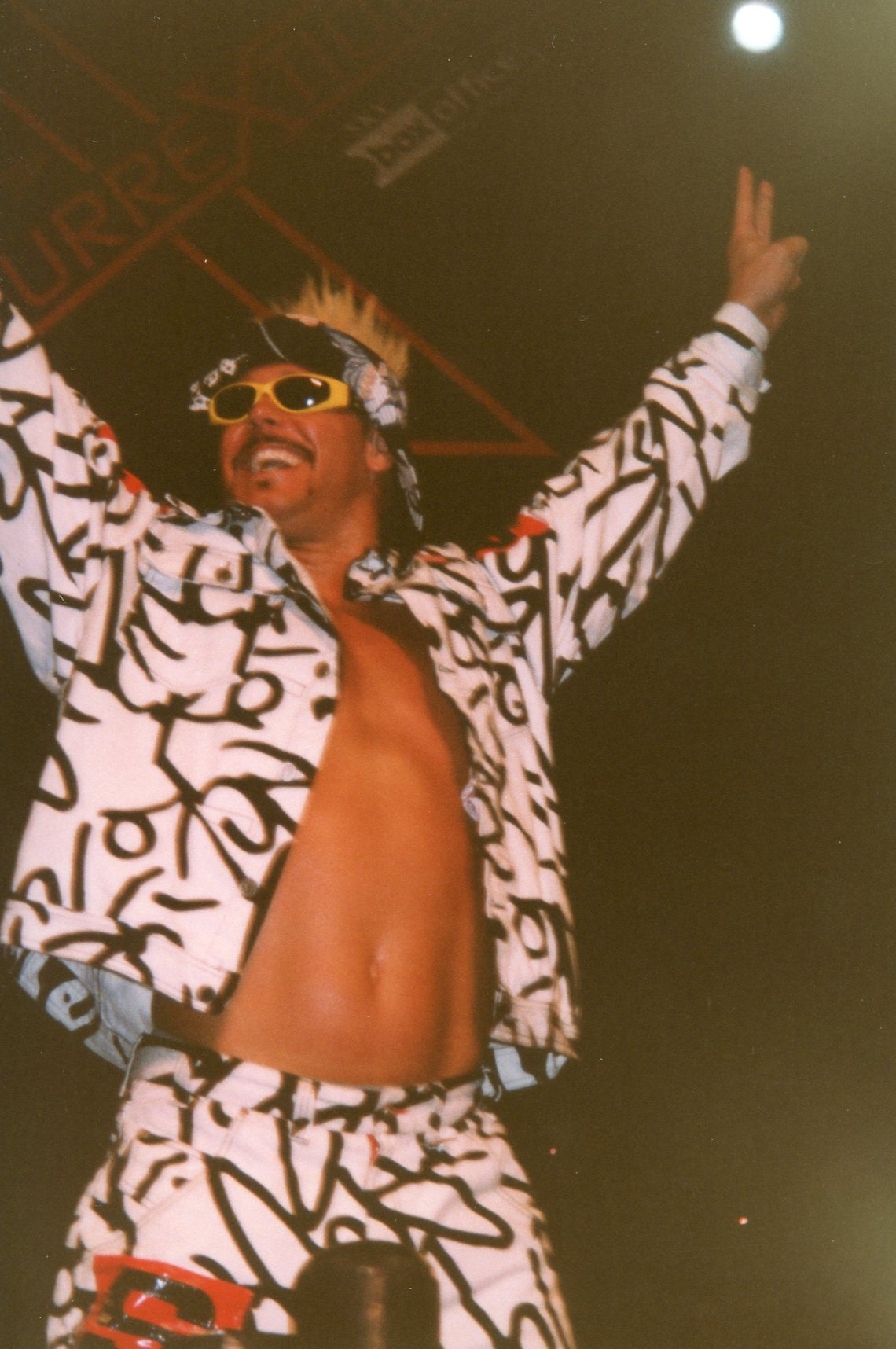
Garland, as Scotty 2 Hotty during his time in Too Cool

On March 29, 1998 at WrestleMania XIV, Taylor and "Too Sexy" Brian Christopher teamed together for the first time, taking part in a tag team battle royal. Following WrestleMania XIV, Taylor and Christopher continued to team together on the WWF's syndicated Saturday wrestling shows, with Taylor playing the straight man to Christopher's over-the-top, egotistical antics. Soon, Taylor adopted Christopher's flamboyant actions and in-ring mannerisms and became known as Scott "Too Hot" Taylor, with the duo dubbed "Too Much". In June 1999, they were renamed "Too Cool" and given the characteristics of hip hop aficionados.

Shortly after debuting their new gimmicks, the team was temporarily separated after Christopher tore his anterior cruciate ligament and was sidelined for five months. During this time, Taylor began incorporating breakdancing moves into his matches. In late 1999, Taylor was renamed Scotty 2 Hotty and Christopher was renamed Grandmaster Sexay. They aligned themselves with Rikishi Fatu (whom they quickly renamed Rikishi), forming a faction. Following their matches, they would dance in the center of the ring.

In early 2000, the group began feuding with The Radicalz, culminating with Too Cool teaming with Chyna to defeat Eddie Guerrero, Perry Saturn and Dean Malenko at WrestleMania 2000. After Grandmaster re-injured his leg, Scotty briefly returned to the Light Heavyweight division, and on April 17, 2000, he defeated Radicalz member Dean Malenko to win the WWF Light Heavyweight Championship. He held the title for only 10 days before dropping it back to Malenko on April 27, 2000. Scotty challenged Malenko for the title once more at Backlash, but was defeated. Grandmaster returned in mid-2000, and on May 29, Too Cool defeated Edge and Christian for the WWF Tag Team Championship with the assistance of rapper Joe C. They held the title until King of the Ring, when Edge and Christian regained the title.

Too Cool and Rikishi separated in late 2000 after Rikishi was revealed to have run over Stone Cold Steve Austin. Rikishi subsequently easily defeated his former allies in a handicap match. In March 2001, the intervertebral disc between Scotty's C5, and C6, C7 vertebra bulged, and he was forced to take time off and do physical therapy 5 days a week. His absence was explained that he suffered a (kayfabe) broken ankle at the hands of Kurt Angle on the March 5, 2001 episode of Raw. While Scotty was recuperating, Grandmaster was released from the company for illegally conveying drugs across the Canada–United States border.

==== Various tag teams (2001–2007) ====
Scotty returned to the ring in June 2001, taking part in the rivalry between Team WWF and The Alliance. During this time, he formed a tag team with Albert, who subsequently adopted the nickname "The Hip Hop Hippo", and they collectively became known as the "Zoo Crew". The team competed in the tag team division until April 2002, when Albert betrayed Scotty by attacking him. Soon thereafter, Scotty began experiencing pains in his previously injured neck, and on May 7, 2002, Dr. Lloyd Youngblood performed neck surgery (cervical fusion) on him.

Scotty spent 18 months recuperating, returning to the ring on television in October 2003. Wrestling on the SmackDown! brand, Scotty formed a tag team with his former ally Rikishi. Together, they competed in the tag team division and ultimately defeated the Basham Brothers to win the WWE Tag Team Championship on February 5, 2004. Scotty and Rikishi successfully defended their titles in a four-way tag team match at WrestleMania XX. Their reign ended on April 22, 2004 when they were defeated by Charlie Haas and Rico. At Judgment Day, Scotty lost to Mordecai in Mordecai's in ring debut. On July 16, 2004, WWE released Rikishi, leaving Scotty on his own.

After Rikishi's release, Scotty wrestled mainly on Velocity and in dark matches until early 2007. He also teamed with Funaki from 2005 to 2006. In late 2004, Scotty had a scare of testicular cancer, but he quickly recovered and was back wrestling within a couple of months. In February 2007 he returned briefly to the Raw roster, competing in a handful of matches on WWE Heat. He was released from the company on May 18, 2007.

=== Return to WWE ===
==== Sporadic appearances (2007, 2012, 2014) ====
Seven months after his release, on the December 10, 2007 15-Year Anniversary special episode of Raw, Scotty would take part in a "15-Year Flashback Battle Royal", lasting to the final four before being eliminated by Skinner. On the August 15, 2012 episode of NXT, Scotty would make a surprise appearance, defeating Heath Slater. On the January 6, 2014 episode of Raw, Scotty would reunite with Grand Master Sexay and Rikishi, defeating 3MB (Heath Slater, Drew McIntyre and Jinder Mahal) in a six-man tag team match. On February 24, at NXT Arrival, Scotty would team with Sexay, challenging The Ascension for the NXT Tag Team Championship in a losing effort.

==== NXT Trainer (2016–2021) ====
On September 7, 2016, Garland made his return to WWE as a trainer at the WWE Performance Center. According to Pro Wrestling Torch in 2017, Garland taught the middle class at the WWE Performance Center, the second of four levels of classes. He would stay with WWE until November 23, 2021, when Garland reportedly asked for his release from the company.

=== Independent circuit (2007–2016, 2022–present) ===
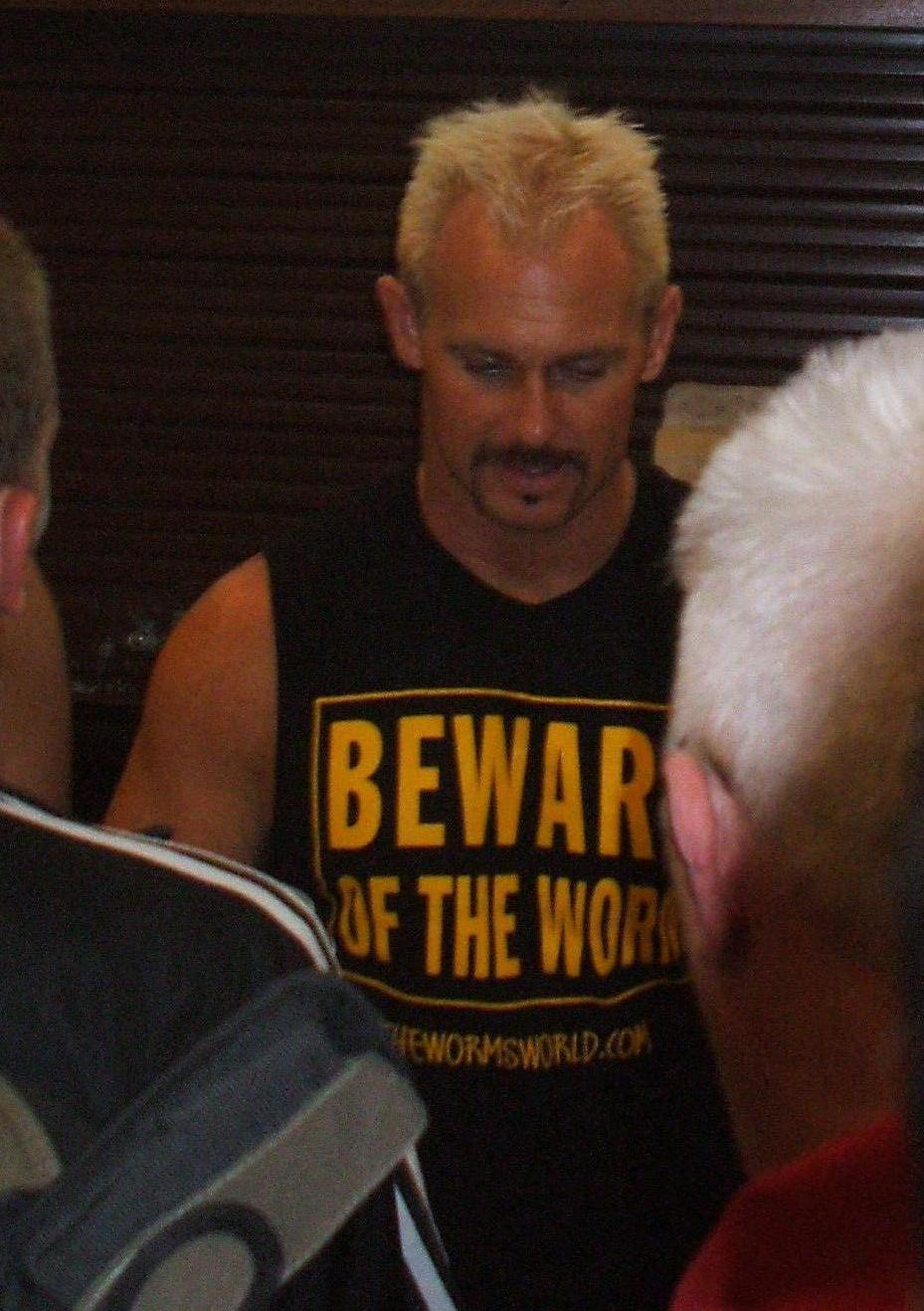
Garland working on the Independent circuit

After leaving WWE, Garland worked two shows for Puerto Rico's International Wrestling Association (IWA) in mid-June 2007. He then wrestled on the independent circuit, working for at least 31 promotions in 11 countries as Scotty 2 Hotty and Scotty the Hotty. In 2014 and 2015 Garland continued teaming with Grand Master Sexay in the independents, England and Germany. On December 6, 2014, Garland, as Scotty 2 Hotty, made his debut for the Japanese Pro Wrestling Noah promotion, teaming with Funaki and Super Crazy in a six-man tag team match, where they defeated Pesadilla, Yoshinari Ogawa and Zack Sabre Jr., with Scotty pinning Pesadilla for the win. He would retire from wrestling in 2016, when he was hired by WWE as a coach for their development territory NXT.

On New Year’s Day 2022, he made his return to independent wrestling for the first time since 2016 for Game Changer Wrestling’s Die For This pay-per-view where he lost to Joey Janela. Recently he has trained wrestlers and wrestled matches in the United Kingdom, Ireland and Norway.

Since 2024, he teams up with his son, Keegan.

=== All Elite Wrestling (2023–present) ===
Garland made his All Elite Wrestling debut competing in a dark match on the December 27, 2023 episode Dynamite, teaming with Billy Gunn and The Acclaimed in an 8-man tag team match, defeating Jake Hager, Matt Menard and The Gunns. On January 11, 2024, Garland revealed on the AEW Unrestricted podcast that he was signed to the company as a producer and coach.

== Firefighting career ==
In February 2013, Garland began training as a firefighter. In June 2013, he graduated from the Lake Tech Fire Academy in Florida. He subsequently began training as an emergency medical technician.

== Personal life ==
Garland lives in the Orlando, Florida area with his two children. Garland is a fan of Disney (Mick Foley has called him a "Disney psychotic"), and has been to Disneyland and Walt Disney World many times. He bought a Dumbo Halloween costume, among much other merchandise, for his daughter, Taylor before she was even born.

== Other media ==
Garland appeared in-character, alongside Kid Kash in the December 2009 video for the Irish band Fight Like Apes' single "Do You Karate". In 2010, he completed filming a movie called Ultimate Death Match 3, which also featured other wrestlers. In 2017, the American music group Migos paid homage to Garland's WWE character with their song titled "Too Hotty".

== Championships and accomplishments ==
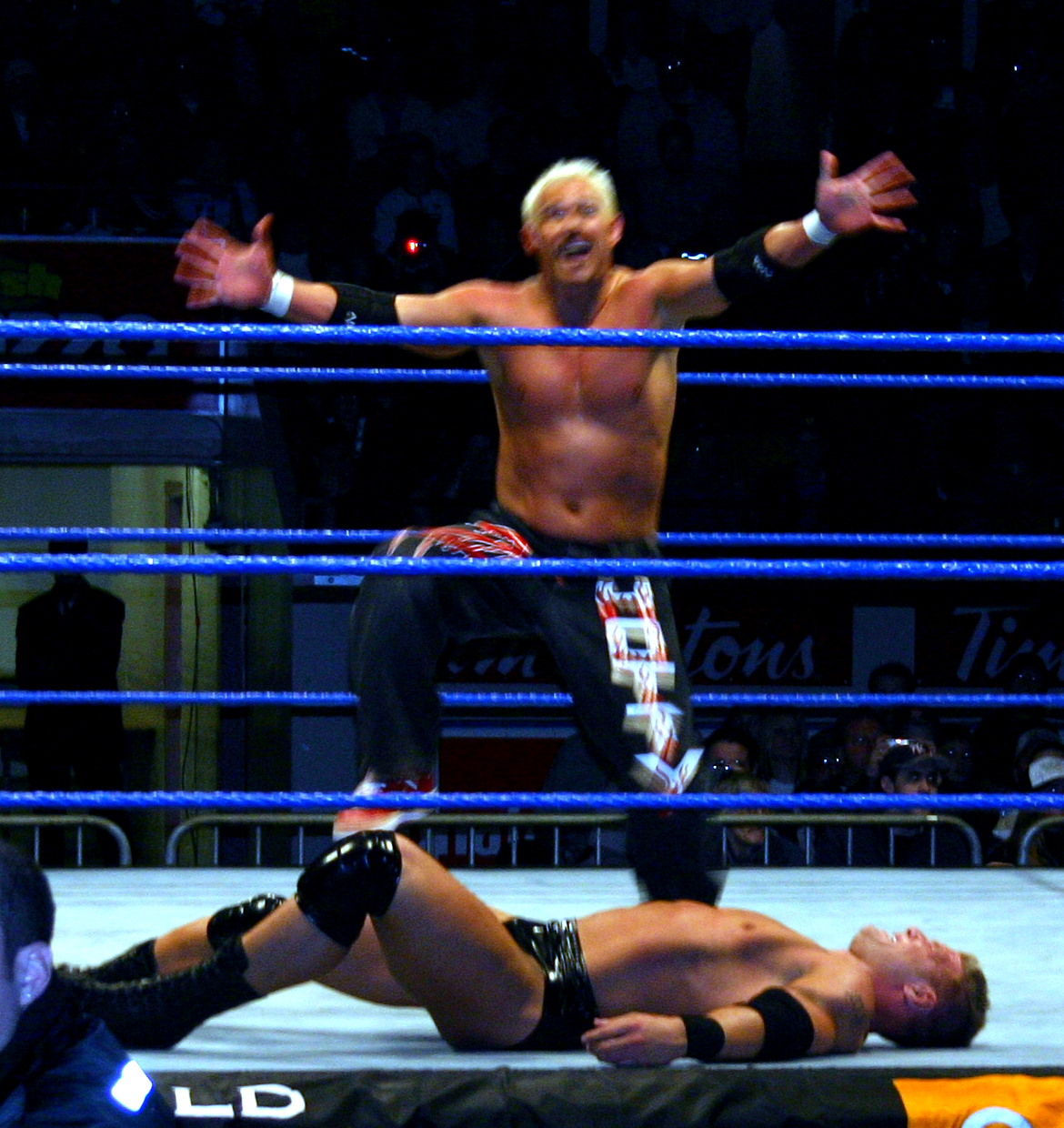
Scotty 2 Hotty preparing to perform The Worm against Mark Jindrak in January 2005

- All Action Wrestling
  - AAW Tag Team Championship (1 time) – with Dallas Knight
- CLASH Wrestling
  - CLASH Tag Team Championship (1 time, current) – with Keagan Garland
- Coastal Championship Wrestling
  - CCW Heavyweight Championship (1 time)
- Eastern Pro Wrestling
  - EPW Heavyweight Championship (1 time)
  - White River Royal Rumble (2008)
- New England Wrestling Association
  - NEWA Heavyweight Championship (5 times)
  - NEWA Tag Team Championship (2 times) – with Steve Ramsey
- Pro Wrestling Illustrated
  - PWI ranked him #33 of the top 500 singles wrestlers in the PWI 500 in 2000
- Pro Wrestling International
  - PWI International Heavyweight Championship (1 time)
- World Wrestling Federation / World Wrestling Entertainment
  - WWF Light Heavyweight Championship (1 time)
  - WWF Tag Team Championship (1 time) – with Grand Master Sexay
  - WWE Tag Team Championship (1 time) – with Rikishi
