= Kevin Gill (actor and professional wrestling commentator) =

- Employers: Hoodslam (2010–2014); Juggalo Championship Wrestling (2010–2017); West Coast Pro Wrestling (2019–2020); Game Changer Wrestling (2018–2022); America's Most Liked Wrestling and WrestleCade (2022–present)

Kevin Gill, also known by his stage name "KG" Kevin Gill and his pseudonym KG, is an actor, music producer, film director, and video game developer. He is known for his work in video game studios such as Rockstar Games and Eidos Interactive along with roles as a professional wrestling commentator with Hoodslam, Juggalo Championship Wrestling (JCW), Game Changer Wrestling (GCW), and in the independent circuit. He also has worked as a referee for JCW from 2005 to 2009 and is also the founder of Striving For Togetherness Records.

== Video game career ==
In 1998, Kevin Gill joined Rockstar Games and assisted with developing several titles such as Earthworm Jim 3D, Skate and Destroy, and Grand Theft Auto 2. In 2001, Gill joined Eidos Interactive where his first credited job with the company was as a product manager for EOE: Eve of Extinction. In 2002, Gill worked on porting Mister Mosquito to international markets.

In 2003, Kevin Gill served as the lead developer, writer, and soundtrack supervisor for Backyard Wrestling: Don't Try This At Home, a professional wrestling video game which featured several independent professional wrestlers such as Mad Man Pondo, M-Dogg 20, The Rudeboy, Josh Prohibition, Tom Dub, Sabu, and Tylene Buck, and rappers Violent J and Shaggy 2 Dope of Insane Clown Posse, Twiztid's Jamie Madrox and Monoxide Child, and Jumpsteady. He also voiced a nameless talk show host in the game. Gill was also the lead developer and writer for the sequel game Backyard Wrestling 2: There Goes The Neighborhood in which he provided additional voice roles along with voicing professional wrestlers Vampiro and the Sandman.

== Professional wrestling career (2010–present) ==
=== Hoodslam (2010–2014) ===
Kevin Gill made his professional wrestling commentary debut on April 11, 2010, with Hoodslam's first event titled Victory: Hoodslam!.

=== Juggalo Championship Wrestling (2005–2017) ===
In 2005, Kevin Gill began working as a referee for various Juggalo Championship Wrestling (JCW) events. On March 26, 2011, Gill began providing commentary for JCW beginning with the first JCW event to be aired on pay-per-view, Hatchet Attacks 2011.

On September 16, 2017, Kevin Gill took to the stage at the Juggalo March in Washington, D.C. to protest the classification of juggalos as a gang alongside the Insane Clown Posse and various juggalos who were impacted by the classification.

=== Independent circuit (2015–present) ===
Beginning on March 27, 2015, Kevin Gill would begin doing commentary for various independent promotions starting with the King of Indies tournament which aired live on WWNLive.

=== Game Changer Wrestling (2018–2022) ===
On April 6, 2018, Kevin Gill would begin providing commentary for various Game Changer Wrestling (GCW) events beginning with Joey Janela's Spring Break 2.

In November 2024, Kevin Gill filed a lawsuit against Game Changer Wrestling, alleging that he was owed money by the promotion in relation to their Patreon account, claiming he would receive 20% of the revenue made from the account, however, he stopped receiving payments in September 2020.

== Filmography ==
=== Video games ===
List of credits in video games
Year	Title	Role	Crew role, Notes	Source
1999	Grand Theft Auto 2		Special thanks	
1999	Earthworm Jim 3D		Production crew	
1999	Skate and Destroy		Production crew, Rockstar Games	
2001	Oni		Production crew	
2002	EOE: Eve of Extinction		product manager, Eidos Interactive (US version)	
2002	TimeSplitters 2		Special thanks	
2002	Mister Mosquito		Production crew, Eidos Interactive	
2003	Backyard Wrestling: Don't Try This at Home	Talk show host	Writer, soundtrack supervisor	
2004	Backyard Wrestling 2: There Goes the Neighborhood	Vampiro, Sandman, Kelvin Finn, additional voices	Writer	
2006	Escape from Bug Island	Mike		
2007	Tomb Raider: Anniversary		Senior marketing manager	
2009	Transformers: Revenge of the Fallen		Marketing director	
2013	Saints Row IV	KG		

=== Films and TV shows ===
List of performances in films
Year	Title	Role	Crew role, Notes	Source
1999	N.Y.H.C.	Self		
2010	Big Money Rustlas	Scruffy Scrub #2		
2013–2014	Insane Clown Posse Theater	Self		
2013	Wrestling with Parenthood	Announcer	Executive producer	
2014	11 Minutes	The Cop		
2017	Cryonic	Self		
2017	Goldblooded	Old EMT		
2018	Hell	Ring announcer		
