= What's on My Mind (Kansas song) =

1977 single by Kansas

Single by Kansas

from the album Leftoverture
- B-side: "Lonely Street"
- Released: May 1977
- Studio: Studio in the Country
- Genre: Progressive rock, pop rock
- Length: 3:27
- Label: Kirshner
- Songwriter: Kerry Livgren
- Producer: Jeff Glixman

Kansas singles chronology
"Carry On Wayward Son" (1976)	"What's on My Mind" (1977)	"Point of Know Return" (1977)

"What's on My Mind" is a song written by Kerry Livgren that was first released by Kansas on their 1976 album Leftoverture. It was also released as the follow-up single from the album to their hit "Carry On Wayward Son".

"What's on My Mind" was not as successful as "Carry On Wayward Son" and did not chart on the Billboard Hot 100. It did reach No. 87 on the Cash Box Top 100 Singles chart. It also reached No. 89 in Canada.

== Background ==
"What's on My Mind" was the first song written for Leftoverture and served as a starting point for the album. Unlike most songs written by Livgren, the subject of the song is a personal relationship.

== Reception ==
Cash Box said of the single "What's on My Mind" that it has a "combination of accessible pop melodies and brittle-edged instrumentation" and that "there are hooks here in the guitar work as well as the harmony vocals." Record World said that "its structure is much simpler than 'Wayward Son'" but that "its high-energy hooks [are] just as compelling."

News-Pilot critic Joseph Bensoua called out "What's on My Mind" and "Carry On Wayward Son" as "examples of how progressive musical themes can be merged with the basic energy of afforded with punchy rock." St. Louis Post-Dispatch critic John S. Cullinane called "What's on My Mind" "the only clinker" on side 1 of Leftoverture and said that Livgren may have "had his mind on alfalfa fields and hog prices back home when he penned the sentimental lyrics." Journal and Courier critic Mike Delaney felt that the song would make an excellent B-side of a single because it has "lots of punchy guitar contained within a very commercial song structure."

In 1998, St. Louis News Tribune critic Andy Charest described "What's on My Mind" as one of Kansas' hits. In 2016, Atlanta Constitution critic Melissa Ruggieri described "What's on My Mind" as a "fan favorite". Music journalist Gary Graff affirmed Bensoua's view that the song is "punchy rock".

== Other releases ==
"What's on My Mind" has been included on several of Kansas' compilation albums, including Carry On in 1992, The Kansas Boxed Set in 1994, The Ultimate Kansas in 2002 and Sail On: The 30th Anniversary Collection in 2004.

== Live performances ==
Kansas violinist David Ragsdale called out "What's on My Mind" as a song that Ronnie Platt, who joined Kansas as lead vocalist in 2014, sings particularly well in live concerts. "What's on My Mind" was included on the 2017 live album Leftoverture Live & Beyond. Prog magazine critic David West said that it "has a swaggering hard rock strut."

== Charts ==
Chart (1977)	Peak position
Canada Top Singles (RPM)	89
