= Overtake (video game) =

1992 video game

- Developer(s): Zoom
- Publisher(s): Zoom
- Composer(s): Hideyuki Shimono; Naoyuki Kimura
- Platform(s): X68000
- Release: JP: November 13, 1992
- Genre(s): Racing
- Mode(s): Single-player

Overtake (オーバーテイク) is a 1992 Formula One racing video game based on the 1992 season produced by ZOOM Inc. for the X68000 and licensed by FOCA to Fuji Television.

== See also ==
- Overtaking
- Formula One video games
