= Zoom (video game company) =

Japanese video game company

ZOOM Inc.
- Native name: 株式会社ズーム
- Industry: Media, video games
- Founded: May 1988
- Headquarters: Sapporo, Hokkaido
- Website: Official website

ZOOM Inc. (Japanese: 株式会社ズーム, Hepburn: Kabushiki gaisha Zūmu) is a Japanese video game company based in Sapporo. The company was started by Akira Sato and initially produced a few titles for the X68000 system including Lagoon and Phalanx.

In April 1993, Zoom established a joint venture with Imagineer before it was disbanded in January 1995; together they had released a Super Famicom baseball game, Dolucky no Kusayakiu, which was slated for an American release as Zoo Ball but was cancelled. They developed a fighting game as a PlayStation launch title, Zero Divide, as well as an adaptation of Rurouni Kenshin: Ishin Gekitōhen, and later developed Mister Mosquito on PlayStation 2.

The company's mascot is a cat named NECO, whose first appearance was on the Genocide game intro and manual. In the Dolucky video game series, the mascot appears as the main character. It also appears in the Zero Divide titles as a playable fighter.

== Games ==
- Genocide, X68000 (1989)
- Lagoon, X68000 (1990)
- Phalanx, X68000 (1991)
- Genocide 2: Master of the Dark Communion, X68000 (1991)
- Overtake, X68000 (1992)
- Genocide Square, FM Towns (1992)
- Dolucky no Kusayakiu, Super Famicom (1993)
- Dolucky's A-League Soccer, Super Famicom (1994)
- Dolucky no Puzzle Tour '94, Super Famicom (1994)
- Zero Divide, PlayStation (1995)
- Rurouni Kenshin: Ishin Gekitōhen, PlayStation (1996)
- Zero Divide 2: The Secret Wish, PlayStation (1997)
- Zero Divide: The Final Conflict, Sega Saturn (1997)
- CART Flag to Flag (known in Japan as Super Speed Racing), Dreamcast (1999)
- Mister Mosquito, PlayStation 2 (2001)
- Mister Mosquito 2, PlayStation 2 (2003)
- Fantastic Tambourine, WiiWare (2009)
- Phalanx, WiiWare (2009)
- Fantasic Cube, WiiWare (2010)
