= EOE: Eve of Extinction =

2002 video game

- North American box art
- Developer: Yuke's
- Publisher: Eidos Interactive
- Designer: Kenji Nakamura
- Writer: Kenji Nakamura
- Composer: Masaya Imoto
- Platform: PlayStation 2
- Release: NA: 26 February 2002; EU: 22 March 2002; JP: 23 May 2002
- Genre: Beat 'em up
- Mode: Single-player

EOE: Eve of Extinction is a 2002 beat 'em up video game developed by Yuke's and published by Eidos Interactive exclusively for PlayStation 2. The game features a man named Josh trying to save his girlfriend Elliel after she was transformed into a weapon called Legacy by the corporation known as Wisdom. The game was met with mixed reception, with reviewers praising the combat but criticizing the graphics and camera.

== Gameplay ==
EOE: Eve of Extinction is a 3D beat 'em up with platforming elements. The player can string together a series of combos by using different forms of the Legacy weapon that Josh wields, and can switch types of the weapon using the L1 and R1 buttons. Switching to different types of weapons during combos will increase the length of the combos and cause them to do more damage. Using Legacy types repeatedly will cause them to level up, causing them to do more damage the more the blades are used. Beating bosses will unlock new weapons, such as a crossbow, a broadsword, a rod, and an axe. Throughout the game, "ley seeds" can be found, which act as upgrades to weapons. These upgrades allow the weapons to get special abilities, such as gravity-manipulation for the axe and healing bolts for the crossbow. Pressing the second analog stick allows Josh to use a special attack called a "Legacy Drive" which causes a pattern to appear on screen. Tracing the pattern using the analogue stick causes Josh to execute the attack. Upon finishing the game, an extra arena mode is unlocked, along with being able to replay the game with weapons from a former playthrough.

== Plot ==
The main character, Josh Calloway (voiced by Cam Clarke), is an employee of the Wisdom Company, which is portrayed as a stereotypical evil corporation. Wisdom plans to achieve worldwide military control with a certain weapon to outpower any other: "Legacy". Legacy is created by fusing a rare alloy called Orichalcum with a human soul. Wisdom takes Josh's girlfriend, Elliel (voiced by Jennifer Hale), also an employee of Wisdom, and creates Legacy out of her, which makes her body disappear, and her essence is within the weapon that Josh wields. The player's main goal in the game is to return her to normal, using a certain memory chip owned by the Wisdom CEO. Josh and Eliel, Eliel is already turned into Legacy, are transported in a plane, which suffers a malfunction, and crashes. Elliel can sense other Legacy, and that is what she and Josh follow when they hunt for the CEO. Eventually, they meet the CEO of Wisdom, Agla (voiced by Peter Renaday), and defeat him, and Elliel is returned to normal.

== Reception ==
Reception

Aggregate scores
Aggregator	Score
GameRankings	57.86%
Metacritic	57/100

Review scores
Publication	Score
AllGame	2.5/5
Electronic Gaming Monthly	4.67/10
Game Informer	6.5/10
GamePro	3/5
GameRevolution	C
GameSpot	6.5/10
GameSpy	71%
GameZone	6.7/10
IGN	3.5/10
Official U.S. PlayStation Magazine	2.5/5
Maxim	6/10

The game was met with a mixed reception, with the combat being praised, but the camera, graphics, enemy A.I., and controls being panned. GameRankings gave it a score of 57.86%, while Metacritic gave it 57 out of 100.

Writing for Allgame, Scott Marriott praised the games combat, saying, "Yet it's hard not to get pumped up when the bullets start firing in slow motion (complete with streaks of light), the techno music starts thumping, and you're performing roundhouse kicks on a poor sap's skull.", but criticized the camera, calling it "stubbornly riged". Writing for IGN, Douglass Perry found the game to be dull, saying " Not to charge up the good 'ol meanness machine or anything, but my job is supposed to be somewhat fun, and spending my time playing this game didn't live up to the hype.", and also likened the graphics to "An empty, brown paper bag". Writing for Gamespy, Andrei Alupului praised the combat and gameplay, but criticized the graphics, saying "[...] the graphics themselves aren’t really that spectacular. To be quite honest, this game looks only marginally better than a first-generation PS2 title, so if you’re expecting loads of eye candy, get ready to be disappointed."

In 2009, GamesRadar included it among the games "with untapped franchise potential", commenting: "This Matrix-styled beat-em-up from Smackdown dev Yukes had glowy lightsaber weapons and fun, button-mashy combat. Criminally dumb AI and a bland protag kept EOE from really standing out or developing into a franchise, though there was potential in the underlying gameplay and setting."
