= What's on My Mind? =

Studio album by the Dayton Family
- Released: April 25, 1995
- Recorded: Silver Sun Studio (Flint, Michigan)
- Genre: Hardcore hip-hop; Midwestern hip-hop
- Length: 56:52
- Label: Po' Broke Records; Relativity
- Producer: The Dayton Family; Steve Pitts

The Dayton Family chronology
What's on My Mind? (1995)	F.B.I. (Fuck Being Indicted) (1996)

Professional ratings
Review scores
Source	Rating
AllMusic	3/5 stars

What's On My Mind? is the debut album by the American hip-hop group the Dayton Family. It was released in 1995 through Po' Broke/Relativity Records. Production was handled by the Dayton Family and Steve Pitts.

== Track listing ==
All lyrics are written by Ira Dorsey, Raheen Peterson and Matthew Hinkle; all music is composed by Steve Pitts.

No.	Title	Length
1.	"Sound Effectz"	0:06
2.	"Smoke for Free"	4:09
3.	"I'm a Gee"	4:58
4.	"Potato Chip"	4:47
5.	"Oxydol"	3:11
6.	"Watch Yo Ass"	4:44
7.	"Nutty Niggaz"	4:22
8.	"Dope Dayton Ave."	4:47
9.	"Sound Effectz"	0:05
10.	"Flint Niggazz Don't Play"	4:19
11.	"Thru a Thang"	4:07
12.	"Billy Blunt"	5:17
13.	"What's on My Mind?"	5:51
14.	"Flint Town"	6:09
Total length:		56:52

== Chart history ==
Chart (1995)	Peak position
US Top R&B/Hip-Hop Albums (Billboard)	38
US Heatseekers Albums (Billboard)	33
