= McGee Park =

Public park in Farmington, New Mexico

- Interactive map of McGee Park
- Address: 41 Road 5568
- Location: Farmington, New Mexico
- Coordinates: 36°41′56.4″N 108°5′52.8″W
- Owner: San Juan County
- Type: Fairground

Website
- Official website

McGee Park is a fairground located in Farmington, New Mexico. It is owned by San Juan County and consists of the following facilities:

== Memorial Coliseum ==
The McGee Park Memorial Coliseum, a 5,137-seat multipurpose arena, is one of only five indoor arenas in New Mexico. It has a 29,000-square-foot (2,700 m^{2}) arena floor and can seat up to 8,137 for concerts. Rodeos, Ice shows, other sporting events, along with conventions and trade shows, are also held here. The arena has only two concession stands, and contains a covered 3,800-square-foot (350 m^{2}) pavilion as well as a 6,840-square-foot (635 m^{2}) patio area where the arena's ticket facilities are located. The arena's stage measure 36 feet (11 m) by 40 feet (12 m). It has a ceiling height of 45 feet (14 m).

== Convention Center ==
The McGee Park Convention Center, built in 2006, features 49,500 square feet (4,600 m^{2}) of space and can seat up to 5,757. It is used for concerts, conventions, trade shows, banquets, and other special events. There is a 40-by-60-foot permanent stage, two dressing rooms, and a concession area, among other amenities at the center.

== Multi-Use Building ==
The 18,750-square-foot (1,742 m^{2}) Multi-Use Building is used for banquets, meetings and other special events. It consists of five meeting rooms.

== Riding Arena ==
The riding arena is a 1,250-seat indoor arena, built in 2006. It is used for rodeos and other equestrian events. It contains 28,160 square feet (2,616 m^{2}) of space.

== Outdoor Arena ==
The Outdoor Arena has 20,000 square feet (2,000 m^{2}) of space and also seats 1,250. It also is used for auto racing and equestrian events.

== Other facilities ==
Other facilities at McGee Park include:

- A livestock barn.
- 100 horse stalls.
- A 4,500-square-foot (420 m^{2}) patio.
- A 12,500-square-foot (1,160 m^{2}) covered pavilion
- 574 RV lots.
