= Mister Mosquito =

2001 video game

- North American box art
- Developer: Zoom (Note: Additional work by Sony Computer Entertainment Japan.)
- Publishers: JP: Sony Computer Entertainment; WW: Fresh Games
- Director: Hiroaki Nakagawa
- Producer: Yasuhide Kobayashi
- Programmers: Junichi Takeda; Yoshinori Nakamura; Yuzaburo Maruyama; Masaru Sasaki
- Composers: Akihito Okawa; Hozo Okazaki
- Platforms: PlayStation 2, PlayStation 4 (PSN), PlayStation 5 (PSN)
- Release: PlayStation 2: JP: June 21, 2001; NA: March 13, 2002; PAL: March 22, 2002; PlayStation 4 / PlayStation 5: September 17, 2024
- Genres: Simulation, stealth
- Mode: Single-player

Mister Mosquito, spelled Mr Moskeeto in PAL regions and known in Japan as Ka (蚊; lit. "Mosquito"), is a stealth video game developed by Zoom and published by Sony Computer Entertainment for the PlayStation 2. It was released in Japan in June 2001 and internationally by Fresh Games in March 2002.

The player controls a mosquito named "Mister Mosquito", the game's title character, who has taken up residency in the house of the Yamada family, life-sized humans that serve as the protagonist's food source in the game. The goal of the game is to stock up on blood during the summer so that the mosquito can hibernate through the autumn and winter. The player is tasked with sucking blood from nearby humans while remaining undetected. If the player is not careful, the human will become stressed and eventually attack them.

On September 17, 2024, the game was re-released on PlayStation 4 and PlayStation 5 through PlayStation Network. This version downgraded the ESRB rating to E10+ rather than the original T rating.

== Gameplay ==
The gameplay revolves around one thing: sucking blood from the Yamada family while they go about their everyday business. However, the player can only suck from a designated body area which is only available at specific times. Each family member follows a set looping pattern of movements. By following these movements, the player must fill a quota of blood for each stage. The challenge in bloodsucking is that each victim has a "stress meter" and the player must make sure that the victim remains unaware of them. Sucking too fast or too slow will increase the victim's stress level. If Mister Mosquito is swatted while sucking blood, instant death occurs. If the player is noticed by a victim while flying around, Battle Mode begins, which is played out like a boss battle. The victim will try to attack Mister Mosquito by various means and, to calm them, the player must hit a number of pressure points which will relieve them of stress. Once they are relaxed enough, they will return to their previous loop.

The game is made up of a series of stages which must be unlocked, in order, by completing each previous stage. Players can choose their own path through each stage. At the start of each stage is a briefing detailing the room where the stage takes place, the victim, and area(s) on their body from which blood can be sucked, as well as any environmental dangers. The rooms in each stage are fully explorable and each has items, hidden in obscure places, which can offer various benefits.

== Development ==
Mister Mosquito was first announced in March 2001 just prior to the Tokyo Game Show. The tentative title of the game was Ka: Yamada-ke No Natsu (蚊 ～山田家の夏～; lit. "Mosquito: The Summer at Yamada Residence"). The game was published in Japan by Sony on June 21, 2001. Eidos Interactive published the game in North America and PAL regions on March 13 and 22, 2002, respectively, under its "Fresh Games" label. According to Eidos' Kevin Gill, the company chose to release games, like Mister Mosquito, because they are often "quirky" or "odd" with "brilliant" gameplay that would otherwise be unlikely to be available outside of Japan.

== Reception ==
Reception

Aggregate scores
Aggregator	Score
GameRankings	68%
Metacritic	65 out of 100

Review scores
Publication	Score
1Up.com	B−
AllGame	3.5 out of 5
Edge	5 out of 10
Electronic Gaming Monthly	6.5 out of 10
Eurogamer	5 out of 10
Game Informer	7 out of 10
GamePro	3.5 out of 5
GameRevolution	C
GameSpot	6.4 out of 10
GameSpy	64%
GameZone	7.8 out of 10
IGN	7.5 out of 10
PlayStation: The Official Magazine	7 out of 10
PSM3	5.2 out of 10
Entertainment Weekly	B

According to Famitsu, Mister Mosquito was the fifth best-selling video game in Japan during its release week at 41,006 copies sold. Approximately 160,210 copies were sold in the country by the end of 2001. The game was released as part of Sony's PlayStation 2 the Best line of budget titles the following year. Sales of Mister Mosquito in other territories were poorer.

In 2008, Game Informer named Mister Mosquito one of "The Top Ten Weirdest Games of All Time". The game was also included by G4 on its own list of weird games. GamesRadar included Mister Mosquito on its list of "The Top 7... games that are cheaper than therapy," as a cure for entomophobia, and also on its list of "Rubbish animals that got turned into video game heroes". Contributor Matt Cundy comically summarized it, in the latter list, "Given that mosquitoes kill millions of people every year, we'd have thought a game that put players in control of such a notorious serial killer would have met with more controversy".

== Legacy ==
On July 3, 2003, a sequel called Ka 2: Let's Go Hawaii (蚊2 レッツゴーハワイ) was released only in Japan. The game takes place in Hawaii, after the Yamada family wins a vacation from a local shop. The gameplay is essentially the same as in Mister Mosquito, but adds a number of new features. It allows the player to suck blood from any part of a human's body, not just designated points. Pressure points now allow the player to suck more blood from certain points. Finally, a new relaxation point system gives the player the opportunity to calm down an attacker if they are being chased. In 2004, Official U.S. PlayStation Magazine named the sequel as one of several Japanese and European games which the publication wanted to see available in North America.

Mr. Mosquito also appeared as an unlockable character in Astro Bot.
