= The Dayton Family =

American hip hop group

- Origin: Flint, Michigan
- Genres: Gangsta rap; horrorcore
- Years active: 1993–2002; 2005–2011; 2015–present
- Labels: Po' Broke (1995); Relativity Records (1996–1999); Gothom (2001); Koch Records (2002–2003); Fast Life Records (2005–2006); UBU Records (2006–2008); DDA Records (2009); Hatchet House (2010–2011)
- Members: Backstabba (1993–1995; 2008–present); Bootleg (1993–1996; 1999–present); Shoestring (1993–present)
- Past members: Ghetto E (1995–2002) (deceased); Jake The Flake (2006–2007)

The Dayton Family is an American hip hop group from Flint, Michigan, composed of Ira "Bootleg" Dorsey, Raheen "Shoestring" Peterson and Matt "Backstabba" Hinkle. Its name derives from Dayton Street, one of Flint's most crime-ridden streets.

== Musical career ==
=== 1993–2005: Early history ===
In 1993, Ira Dorsey and Raheen Peterson met through their younger brothers. The two began writing together, under the names Bootleg and Shoestring, and created their first song, "Dope Dayton Ave". Rapper Matt Hinkle soon joined the duo under the name Backstabba. The group began working with local producer Steve Pitts and formed The Dayton Family, named after Dayton Avenue, one of the most crime-ridden streets in their hometown of Flint, Michigan. In between studio sessions, they performed at local clubs and quickly gain notoriety within Flint.

The Dayton Family recorded a 12-inch single and soon signed with Atlanta independent record label Po' Broke in 1995. That year, the group released their debut album What's on My Mind? and were featured on No Limits Down South Hustlers: Bouncin' and Swingin' compilation album, which got the trio recognition throughout Southern United States. After the album's release, Hinkle was imprisoned and replaced by Bootleg's younger brother Erick, who performed under the name Ghetto-E. Following a year of touring, the group left Po' Broke due to legal problems with the label's producer and signed with Russ Entertainment .

In 1996, they released their second album F.B.I., standing for Fuck Being Indicted, under Russ Entertainment/Relativity Records. The Dayton Family was plagued with various legal problems, including Ira being incarcerated soon after release of F.B.I., which hindered the amount of work the group released. In 1999, both Ira and Peterson released solo albums. Two years later, the group signed with Detroit rapper Esham's Gothom label and released solo albums. The next year, they released Welcome to the Dopehouse under Koch Records.

=== 2005–2010: Stabilization ===
After a three-year hiatus, the group was trimmed down to Ira and Peterson and they released Family Feud through Fast Life Records. The following year, The Dayton Family signed with U Be U Records and released Back on Dayton Ave. The duo added new member Jake the Flake later that same year and released Return to Dayton Ave. in October. Following Hinkle's release from prison, the group returned to their original lineup of Ira, Peterson, and Hinkle. In 2009, they released The Return: The Right to Remain Silent under DDA Records/Paypa Boi Entertainment LLC.

=== 2010–2011: Hatchet House ===
On July 14, 2010, The Dayton Family signed with Insane Clown Posse's subsidiary label Hatchet House. The group released the EP Psycho on February 1, 2011, and a music video was released for the song "Cocaine" on 28 March. Their seventh album, Charges of Indictment, was released on June 28. They most recently featured in the "Psychopathic Psypher" Part 1 & 2 (Bootleg in Part 1 and Shoestring in Part 2). The video for "The Psypher (Part 1 & 2)" was released on June 5, 2011.

=== 2023–present: Recent events ===
On June 10, 2023, it was announced that former member Ghetto E had died at age 46.

== Style and influences ==
The Dayton Family is known for their gritty lyrics concerning ghetto survival, struggle and poverty. AllMusic reviewer Jason Birchmeier describes The Dayton Family's musical style as "potent hardcore rap". He says that the group has "an idiosyncratic identity" and "a dark, grim mentality focused on modest survival rather than riches or fame". The group lists Run-DMC, Michael Jackson, LL Cool J, N.W.A, Geto Boys, Tupac Shakur, Notorious B.I.G., X-Clan, Spice 1, Esham, Natas and Public Enemy as influences.

== Discography ==
=== Studio albums ===
Title	Release	Peak chart positions	
Title	Release	US	US R&B
What's on My Mind?	Released: June 20, 1995; Label: Po' Broke, Relativity; Format: CD, LP, cassette, digital download	—	38
F.B.I.	Released: October 1, 1996; Label: Relativity; Format: CD, LP, cassette, digital download	45	7
Welcome to the Dopehouse	Released: May 21, 2002; Label: Koch; Format: CD, cassette, digital download	107	20
Family Feud	Released: July 12, 2005; Label: Fast Life; Format: CD, digital download	—	86
Return to Dayton Ave	Released: October 31, 2006; Label: UBeU; Format: CD, digital download	—	—
The Return: The Right to Remain Silent	Released: 2009; Label: DDA; Format: CD, digital download	—	—
Charges of Indictment	Released: June 21, 2011; Label: Hatchet House, Psychopathic; Format: CD, digital download	—	75

=== Extended plays ===
Title	Release
Back on Dayton Ave.	Released: 2006; Label: UBeU; Format: CD, digital download
Psycho	Released: February 1, 2011; Label: Hatchet House, Psychopathic; Format: CD, digital download

=== Guest appearances ===
Year	Song	Artist(s)	Album
1996	"Ballers"	First Degree feat. Bootleg	Paper Stacks
1997	"Are You Ready For Us"	Three 6 Mafia feat. The Dayton Family	Chapter 2: World Domination
1997	"U Can't Fuck With Us"	The Fharmacy feat. Bootleg	Goodie
1998	"Bout The South"	Prophet Posse feat. The Dayton Family	Body Parts
1998	"P.M.S. (Potential Murder Suspects)"	The Hard Boyz feat. Ghetto E & Jake The Flake	P.M.S. (Potential Murder Suspects)
1998	"Outsiders"	Ghetto Azz Niggaz feat. Jake the Flake & Shoestring	Faithful To The Streets
1998	"What Worse"	Black Hippiz feat. The Dayton Family	Dead Rezidentz
1998	"Snitch Killa"	Destineal feat. Shoestring	Born To Hustle
1998	"Can't Catch Me"	Ka'Nut feat. Bootleg & Ghetto E	Look At Em Now
1998	"Don't Sleep"	Quarter Mob feat. Shoestring & Ghetto E	Underworld Ties
1998	"Who Be Hate'n"	Quarter Mob feat. Shoestring & Ghetto E	Underworld Ties
1999	"If Niggaz New"	F.O.D. feat. Bootleg	Midwest Poison
2000	"Here Comes The Mack"	Mack The Jacka feat. Bootleg & Layroyce	The True Story
2000	"No Future"	MC Breed feat. Bootleg	The Thugz, Vol. 1
2000	"Da Bird-Man"	Skanbino Mob feat. Shoestring	Playin' Fa Keeps
2000	"Untouchable"	M.A.F.I.A. feat. Bootleg	Misery Loves Company
2001	"How Many Niggas You Know"	MC Breed feat. Bootleg	The Fharmacist
2001	"Brain Surgery"	Esham feat. Shoestring	Tongues
2001	"Fuck A Lover"	Esham feat. The Dayton Family	Tongues
2001	"Holla At Ya Boy"	Moochie Mack feat. Jake The Flake	Broke Pimpin'
2002	"Resume Of A Gangsta"	1st Battalion feat. The Dayton Family	Gutta Gutta
2002	"Gangsta Walk"	Project Born feat. Bootleg	The Rent Is Due
2003	"We Don't Need That"	Project Born feat. Bootleg	Ghetto Celebs
2003	"Take Ya Clothes Off"	Xacution Style feat. Shoestring	Civilized Evil
2004	"Dope Game"	T-Dub & Pee feat. Shoestring	Camouflage
2004	"Body Bag"	Project: Deadman feat. The Dayton Family	Self Inflicted
2004	"Aint Shit"	Project: Deadman feat. Bootleg & MC Breed	Self Inflicted
2004	"How We Roll"	Billy Smokes feat. Bootleg	Filthy Flint Money
2004	"On The Run"	Corleone Family feat. Bootleg	No-Gutz No-Glory
2005	"Calico"	Kurupt feat. The Dayton Family	Against Tha Grain
2005	"Holla When U See Me"	Tito 6 feat. Bootleg	King Of The Great Lakes
2005	"I Ain't The One"	Biz feat. Shoestring & Billy Smokes	Bizness As Usual
2005	"My Life"	E1C feat. Bootleg & Onez Gangsta	It Ain't The $ It's Me
2006	"Twenty Six"	Pastor Troy feat. Bootleg	By Choice or By Force
2006	"On My Block"	C-Murder feat. Bootleg	The Tru Story: Continued
2006	"Duck Down"	Billy Smokes feat. Bootleg (Track was removed at artist's request)	Flint Hip Hop Volume 1
2006	"Anything You Ask For"	The Game feat. Bootleg	G.A.M.E.
2006	"Nothing's Promised"	The Game feat. Bootleg	G.A.M.E.
2006	"It Is What It Is"	The Game feat. Shoestring	G.A.M.E.
2006	"The Naughty North"	Smoke Johnson feat. Shoestring	Analyze That
2007	"Bout The South (Dragged)"	Three 6 Mafia feat. The Dayton Family	Prophet's Greatest Hits
2007	"Sex, Drugs, Money & Murder"	Twiztid feat. The Dayton Family	Independents Day
2007	"Shoot 1st"	Menacide feat. The Dayton Family	Street Symphony
2007	"The G Code (Intro)"	Menacide feat. Bootleg	The Prequel (Mixtape)
2007	"The G Code (Mixtape Mix)"	Menacide feat. The Dayton Family	The Prequel (Mixtape)
2008	"Summer Time"	Bootleg	Gee Pierce Presents: Well Connected (Compilation)
2008	"Are You Fucking? (Skit)"	Bootleg & Madam Dane	Gee Pierce Presents: Well Connected (Compilation)
2008	"Back Stabbers"	Jake The Flake & MC Breed	Gee Pierce Presents: Well Connected (Compilation)
2008	"Big Butt & Ah Smile"	Shoestring	Gee Pierce Presents: Well Connected (Compilation)
2008	"On My Block"	Shoestring & Katastrofee	Gee Pierce Presents: Well Connected (Compilation)
2008	"Leg-Weed Skit"	Bootleg	Gee Pierce Presents: Well Connected (Compilation)
2008	"Leg-Gee Skit"	Gee Pierce & Bootleg	Gee Pierce Presents: Well Connected (Compilation)
2009	"Shoot 1st (bOb E. NiTe Remix)"	Menacide feat. The Dayton Family	From The Ground Down Mixtape
2010	"Damn Bitch"	Blaze Ya Dead Homie feat. The Dayton Family	Gang Rags
2010	"Damn Bitch (Remix)"	Blaze Ya Dead Homie feat. Kottonmouth Kings	Mike E. Clark's Psychopathic Murder Mix Volume 2
2011	"I Just Might"	T-Rock feat. The Dayton Family	I Grind, I Hustle
2011	"I Think It's Time"	Delusional feat. Bootleg	I Think It's Time (single)
2011	Psychopathic Psypher 1	Violent J, Anybody Killa, Jamie Madrox & Bootleg	
2011	Psychopathic Psypher 2	Shaggy 2 Dope, Blaze Ya Dead Homie, Monoxide Child, Boondox & Shoestring	
2012	"I Got Dat Hard"	Mason Napalm Wade feat. The Dayton Family	Tha 9th Edition: Fast Money
