= Strange Music discography =

Strange Music is an American independent record label founded by Tech N9ne and Travis O'Guin in 1999, specializing in hip hop music. It is currently distributed through Ingrooves.

== Album releases ==
Year	Album details	Peak chart positions					Sales
Year	Album details	Billboard 200	Top Independent	Top R&B/Hip-Hop	Top Rap	Top Album Sales	Sales
2001	Tech N9ne – Anghellic ^{[note]}: Released: August 28, 2001; Label: Strange Music, JCOR Entertainment; Format: CD	59	46	50	—N/a	—N/a	278,000
2002	Tech N9ne – Absolute Power: Released: September 24, 2002; Label: Strange Music, MSC Entertainment (MSC10012); Format: CD & Bonus DVD	79	3	28	—N/a	—N/a	358,000
2004	Skatterman & Snug Brim – Urban Legendz: Released: March 23, 2004; Label: Strange Music, MSC Entertainment (MSC-1007 2); Format: CD	—	—	—	—N/a	—N/a	
2004	Project: Deadman – Self Inflicted: Released: July 13, 2004; Label: Strange Music, MSC Entertainment (MSC1011); Format: CD	—	—	—	—N/a	—N/a	
2004	Kutt Calhoun – B.L.E.V.E.: Released: August 10, 2004; Label: Strange Music, MSC Entertainment (MSC-1008 2); Format: CD	—	—	—	—N/a	—N/a	
2006	Tech N9ne – Everready (The Religion): Released: November 7, 2006; Label: Strange Music (SMI 02 1N02); Format: CD & Bonus CD	50	2	23	11	—N/a	264,000
2007	Tech N9ne Collabos – Misery Loves Kompany: Released: July 17, 2007; Label: Strange Music (SMI 04); Format: CD	49	3	23	7	—N/a	106,000
2008	Krizz Kaliko – Vitiligo: Released: May 6, 2008; Label: Strange Music (SMI 45); Format: CD	167	19	50	20	—N/a	15,634
2008	Grave Plott – The Plott Thickens: Released: May 20, 2008; Label: Strange Music (SMI 46); Format: CD	—	—	95	—	—N/a	1,189
2008	Prozak – Tales from the Sick: Released: June 3, 2008; Label: Strange Music (SMI 47); Format: CD & Bonus DVD	—	25	52	20	—N/a	12,560
2008	Tech N9ne – Killer: Released: July 1, 2008; Label: Strange Music (SMI 48); Format: 2CD	12	1	8	6	—N/a	180,000
2008	Skatterman & Snug Brim – Word on tha Streets: Released: August 12, 2008; Label: Strange Music (SMI 49); Format: CD	—	—	—	—	—N/a	1,158
2008	Kutt Calhoun – Feature Presentation: Released: October 7, 2008; Label: Strange Music (SMI 50); Format: CD	—	—	60	—	—N/a	2,658
2009	Tech N9ne Collabos – Sickology 101: Released: April 28, 2009; Label: Strange Music (SMI 54); Format: CD	19	2	12	6	—N/a	118,000
2009	Krizz Kaliko – Genius: Released: July 14, 2009; Label: Strange Music (SMI 57); Format: CD	85	12	14	3	—N/a	5,300
2009	Big Scoob – Monsterifik: Released: September 15, 2009; Label: Strange Music (SMI 60); Format: CD	—	—	67	—	—N/a	
2009	Tech N9ne – K.O.D.: Released: October 26, 2009; Label: Strange Music (SMI 64); Format: CD	14	1	7	3	—N/a	159,000
2010	Brotha Lynch Hung – Dinner and a Movie: Released: March 23, 2010; Label: Strange Music (SMI 68); Format: CD	69	7	18	6	—N/a	34,041
2010	Kutt Calhoun – Raw and Un-Kutt: Released: June 8, 2010; Label: Strange Music (SMI 76); Format: CD	170	28	27	15	—N/a	16,617
2010	Tech N9ne Collabos – The Gates Mixed Plate: Released: July 27, 2010; Label: Strange Music (SMI 79); Format: CD	13	1	5	4	—N/a	73,000
2010	Krizz Kaliko – Shock Treatment: Released: September 14, 2010; Label: Strange Music (SMI 80); Format: CD	97	20	17	7	—N/a	4,806
2011	Brotha Lynch Hung – Coathanga Strangla: Released: April 5, 2011; Label: Strange Music (SMI 86); Format: CD	68	15	18	9	—N/a	26,564
2011	Big Scoob – Damn Fool: Released: May 3, 2011; Label: Strange Music; Format: CD	—	—	49	24	—N/a	2,514
2011	Tech N9ne – All 6's And 7's: Released: June 7, 2011; Label: Strange Music; Format: CD	4	1	1	1	—N/a	230,000
2011	Jay Rock – Follow Me Home: Released: July 26, 2011; Label: Top Dawg Entertainment/Strange Music; Format: CD	83	14	18	10	—N/a	13,551
2011	Young Bleed – Preserved: Released: October 11, 2011; Label: Strange Lane; Format: CD	—	—	56	37	—N/a	1,574
2011	Tech N9ne Collabos – Welcome to Strangeland: Released: November 8, 2011; Label: Strange Music; Format: CD	21	4	4	3	—N/a	84,000
2012	¡MAYDAY! – Take Me to Your Leader: Released: March 26, 2012; Label: Strange Music; Format: CD	86	18	18	15	—N/a	10,930
2012	Prozak - Paranormal: Released: April 24, 2012; Label: Strange Music; Format: CD	90	15	13	8	—N/a	16,457
2012	Krizz Kaliko – Kickin' & Screamin': Released: May 15, 2012; Label: Strange Music; Format: CD	43	11	7	4	—N/a	25,835
2012	Stevie Stone – Rollin' Stone: Released: June 12, 2012; Label: Strange Music; Format: CD	73	16	12	9	—N/a	15,782
2013	Brotha Lynch Hung – Mannibalector: Released: February 5, 2013; Label: Strange Music; Format: CD	67	13	57	8	—N/a	22,113
2013	Kutt Calhoun – Black Gold: Released: February 26, 2013; Label: Strange Music; Format: CD	120	22	25	13	—N/a	9,249
2013	CES Cru – Constant Energy Struggles: Released: March 26, 2013; Label: Strange Music; Format: CD	98	20	14	9	—N/a	11,928
2013	Rittz – The Life and Times of Jonny Valiant: Released: April 30, 2013; Label: Strange Music; Format: CD	25	6	8	5	—N/a	44,283
2013	Wrekonize – The War Within: Released: June 25, 2013; Label: Strange Music; Format: CD	84	9	27	5	—N/a	6,792
2013	¡MAYDAY! – Believers: Released: July 16, 2013; Label: Strange Music; Format: Compact disc	75	15	19	11	—N/a	18,000
2013	Tech N9ne – Something Else: Released: July 30, 2013; Label: Strange Music; Format: Compact disc	4	2	2	2	—N/a	169,000
2013	Stevie Stone – 2 Birds 1 Stone: Released: August 13, 2013; Label: Strange Music; Format: Compact disc	76	14	11	9	—N/a	4,700
2013	Krizz Kaliko – Son of Sam: Released: August 27, 2013; Label: Strange Music; Format: Compact disc	56	11	15	11	—N/a	24,000
2013	Prozak – We All Fall Down: Released: September 17, 2013; Label: Strange Music; Format: Compact disc	122	23	20	11	—N/a	9,000
2014	Tech N9ne Collabos – Strangeulation: Released: May 6, 2014; Label: Strange Music; Format: Compact disc	5	1	1	1	—N/a	78,000
2014	¡MAYDAY! x Murs – ¡MursDay!: Released: June 10, 2014; Label: Strange Music; Format: Compact disc	45	12	—	4	—N/a	8,024
2014	CES Cru – Codename: Ego Stripper: Released: August 5, 2014; Label: Strange Music; Format: Compact disc	40	4	4	2	—N/a	14,000
2014	Rittz - Next to Nothing: Released: September 9, 2014; Label: Strange Music; Format: CD	14	5	3	3	—N/a	62,000
2015	Tech N9ne – Special Effects: Released: May 4, 2015; Label: Strange Music; Format: Compact disc	4	1	1	1	4	87,000
2015	MURS – Have A Nice Life: Released: May 18, 2015; Label: Strange Music; Format: Compact disc	94	12	11	6	50	
2015	Stevie Stone – Malta Bend: Released: June 30, 2015; Label: Strange Music; Format: Compact disc	193	12	15	9	89	
2015	¡MAYDAY! – Future Vintage: Released: September 18, 2015; Label: Strange Music; Format: Compact disc	112	16	9	8	53	
2015	Prozak – Black Ink: Released: October 9, 2015; Label: Strange Music; Format: Compact disc	—	24	18	13	97	
2015	Tech N9ne Collabos – Strangeulation Vol. II: Released: November 20, 2015; Label: Strange Music; Format: Compact disc	25	1	4	3	13	50,000
2016	Krizz Kaliko – GO: Released: April 8, 2016; Label: Strange Music; Format: Compact disc	89	6	4	4	29	
2016	Rittz – Top of the Line: Released: May 6, 2016; Label: Strange Music; Format: Compact disc	19	2	3	2	12	
2016	Bernz – See You on the Other Side: Released: July 8, 2016; Label: Strange Music; Format: Compact disc	—	15	13	8	83	
2016	Big Scoob – H.O.G.: Released: November 4, 2016; Label: Strange Music; Format: Compact disc	—	20	16	10	—	
2016	Tech N9ne – The Storm: Released: December 9, 2016; Label: Strange Music; Format: Compact disc	12	3	4	3	10	37,474
2017	CES Cru – Catastrophic Event Specialists: Released: February 10, 2017; Label: Strange Music; Format: Compact disc	150	9	—	—	54	
2017	Murs – Captain California: Released: March 10, 2017; Label: Strange Music; Format: Compact disc	—	22	—	—	—	
2017	Tech N9ne Collabos – Dominion: Released: April 7, 2017; Label: Strange Music; Format: Compact disc	28	5	16	13	12	15,000
2017	Wrekonize – Into the Further: Released: May 5, 2017; Label: Strange Music; Format: Compact disc	—	14	—	—	68	3,332
2017	Stevie Stone – Level Up: Released: June 2, 2017; Label: Strange Music; Format: Compact disc	—	11	—	—	77	
2017	JL - DIBKIS: Released: June 30, 2017; Label: Strange Music; Format: Compact disc	—	10	—	—	—	
2017	¡Mayday! – Search Party: Released: September 8, 2017; Label: Strange Music; Format: Compact disc	—	—	—	—	55	
2017	Rittz – Last Call: Released: September 29, 2017; Label: Strange Music; Format: Compact disc	43	3	25	17	12	
2017	Tech N9ne Collabos – Strange Reign: Released: October 13, 2017; Label: Strange Music; Format: Compact disc	61	7	32	25	21	
2018	Tech N9ne – Planet: Released: March 2, 2018; Label: Strange Music; Format: Compact disc	—	—	—	—	—	21,000
2018	Murs – A Strange Journey into the Unimaginable: Released: March 16, 2018; Label: Strange Music; Format: Compact disc	—	—	—	—	—	
2018	Mackenzie Nicole - The Edge: Released: April 13, 2018; Label: Strange Main (Powered by Strange Music); Format: Compact disc	—	—	—	—	—	
2018	Stevie Stone & JL - Kontra-Band: Released: April 20, 2018; Label: Strange Music; Format: Compact disc	—	—	—	—	—	
2018	Joey Cool - Joey Cool: Released: May 4, 2018; Label: Strange Music; Format: Compact disc	—	—	—	—	—	
2018	Big Scoob - Duality: Released: May 25, 2018; Label: Strange Music; Format: Compact disc	—	—	—	—	—	
2018	¡MAYDAY! - South of 5th: Released: September 7, 2018; Label: Strange Music; Format: Compact disc	—	—	—	—	—	
2019	Tech N9ne - N9na: Released: April 19, 2019; Label: Strange Music; Format: Compact disc	—	—	—	—	—	
2019	Ubiquitous - Under Bad Influence: Released: July 26, 2019; Label: Strange Music; Format: Compact disc	—	—	—	—	—	
2019	Joey Cool - Old Habits Die Hard: Released: September 27, 2019; Label: Strange Music; Format: Compact disc	—	—	—	—	—	
2019	Above Waves - Fugitives: Released: November 1, 2019; Label: Strange Main; Format: Digital download	—	—	—	—	—	
2019	Maez301 - Maez301: Released: November 8, 2019; Label: Strange Music; Format: Compact disc	—	—	—	—	—	
2020	Mackenzie Nicole - Mystic: Released: February 14, 2020; Label: Strange Main; Format: Compact disc	—	—	—	—	—	
2020	Jelly Roll – A Beautiful Disaster: Released: March 13, 2020; Label: It Goes Up Entertainment/Strange Music; Format: Compact disc	—	—	—	—	—	
2020	King Iso – World War Me: Released: March 13, 2020; Label: Strange Music; Format: Compact disc	—	—	—	—	—	
2020	Tech N9ne - Enterfear: Released: April 17, 2020; Label: Strange Music; Format: Compact disc	—	—	—	—	—	
2020	Stevie Stone - Black Lion: Released: August 7, 2020; Label: Strange Music; Format: Compact disc	—	—	—	—	—	
2020	Jehry Robinson - 20/Twenty: Released: August 21, 2020; Label: Strange Music; Format: Compact disc	—	—	—	—	—	
2020	Maez301 - Hasaan: Released: September 11, 2020; Label: Strange Music; Format: Compact disc	—	—	—	—	—	
2020	Krizz Kaliko - Legend: Released: September 18, 2020; Label: Strange Music; Format: Compact disc	—	—	—	—	—	
2020	JL - The Devil Hates Sundays: Released: September 25, 2020; Label: Strange Music; Format: Compact disc	—	—	—	—	—	
2020	Joey Cool - Coolie High: Released: October 9, 2020; Label: Strange Music; Format: Compact disc	—	—	—	—	—	
2020	Jelly Roll - Self Medicated: Released: October 16, 2020; Label: It Goes Up Entertainment/Strange Music; Format: Compact disc	—	—	—	—	—	
2020	Wrekonize - Pressure Point: Released: November 6, 2020; Label: Strange Music; Format: Compact disc	—	—	—	—	—	
2020	Bernz - Sorry for the Mess: Released: December 4, 2020; Label: Strange Music; Format: Compact disc	—	—	—	—	—	
2021	¡MAYDAY! - Minute To Midnight: Released: March 19, 2021; Label: Strange Music; Format: Compact disc	—	—	—	—	—	
2021	Saigon - Pain, Peace & Prosperity - The Yardfather Album: Released: March 26, 2021; Label: It Goes Up Entertainment/Strange Music; Format: Compact disc	—	—	—	—	—	
2021	Joey Cool - i tried to be normal once: Released: August 27, 2021; Label: Strange Music; Format: Compact disc	—	—	—	—	—	
2021	Jehry Robinson - The Name Is Not Important: Released: September 3, 2021; Label: Strange Music; Format: Compact disc	—	—	—	—	—	
2021	The Brazy Bunch - Written In Blood: Released: September 17, 2021; Label: Pie-Rx/It Goes Up Entertainment/Strange Music; Format: Compact disc	—	—	—	—	—	
2021	Tech N9ne - Asin9ne: Released: October 8, 2021; Label: Strange Music; Format: Compact disc	—	—	—	—	—	
2022	Maez301 - Hello, Goodbye.: Released: January 14, 2022; Label: Strange Music; Format: Compact disc	—	—	—	—	—	
2022	King Iso - Get Well Soon: Released: January 21, 2022; Label: Strange Music; Format: Compact disc	—	—	—	—	—	
2022	Joey Cool - The Chairman of the Board: Released: July 15, 2022; Label: Strange Music; Format: Compact disc	—	—	—	—	—	
2023	HU$H - SKUNKWORKS: Released: May 12, 2023; Label: Strange Music; Format: Compact disc	—	—	—	—	—	
2023	X-Raided - A Prayer in Hell: Released: June 2, 2023; Label: Strange Music; Format: Compact disc	—	—	—	—	—	
2023	Tech N9ne - BLISS: Released: July 28, 2023; Label: Strange Music; Format: Compact disc	—	—	—	—	—	
2023	Jehry Robinson - Drink More Water: Released: September 1, 2023; Label: Strange Music; Format: Compact disc	—	—	—	—	—	
2023	Joey Cool - Enjoy The View: Released: September 22, 2023; Label: Strange Music; Format: Compact disc	—	—	—	—	—	
2023	King Iso - iLLdren: Released: October 27, 2023; Label: Strange Music; Format: Compact disc	—	—	—	—	—	
2024	Tech N9ne Collabos - COSM: Released: July 12, 2024; Label: Strange Music; Format: Compact disc	—	—	—	—	—	
2024	X-Raided - A Sin In Heaven: Released: August 23, 2024; Label: Strange Music; Format: Compact disc	—	—	—	—	—	
2024	Joey Cool - Roller Coaster: Released: October 5, 2024; Label: Strange Music; Format: Compact disc	—	—	—	—	—	
2025	Tech N9ne - 5816 Forest: Released: June 27, 2025; Label: Strange Music; Format: Compact disc	__	__	__	__	__	
2025	King Iso - Ghetto Psycho: Released: September 12, 2025; Label: Strange Music; Format: Compact disc	__	__	__	__	__	
2025	Jehry Robinson - Hella Highwater: Released: September 26, 2025; Label: Strange Music; Format: Compact disc	__	__	__	__	__	
2025	X-Raided - A Prophecy in Purgatory: Released: October 3, 2025; Label: Strange Music; Format: Compact disc	__	__	__	__	__	
2026	Joey Cool - Time Will Tell: Released: March 6, 2026; Label: Strange Music; Format: Compact disc	__	__	__	__	__	

Past Album releases notes
1. This listing combines the numbers of both the original 2001 release, Anghellic, as well as the 2003 re-release, Anghellic: Reparation. The peak position on the Independent Chart comes from the re-release, while the other positions are those of the original. As of July 29, 2009, the original release has sold 82,700 or more copies, while the re-release has sold 180,520 or more copies. The number in the table is a collective total between the two releases.

=== Instrumental albums ===
¡MAYDAY! – Take Me To Your Speakers
- Released: January 29, 2013
- Label: Strange Music
- Format: Digital
¡MAYDAY! – Believers
- Released: November 20, 2013
- Label: Strange Music
- Format: Digital

== EP releases ==
Year	EP details	Peak chart positions				Sales
Year	EP details	Billboard 200	Top Independent	Top R&B/Hip-Hop	Top Rap	Sales
2010	Tech N9ne – The Lost Scripts of K.O.D.: Released: March 30, 2010; Label: Strange Music (SMI 74); Format: CD	117	9	31	13	
2010	Tech N9ne – Seepage: Released: October 25, 2010; Label: Strange Music (SMI 82); Format: CD	57	5	10	6	
2011	Krizz Kaliko – S.I.C.: Released: May 17, 2011; Label: Strange Music (SMI 94); Format: CD	—	42	42	22	1,080
2011	Kutt Calhoun – Red-Headed Stepchild: Released: August 9, 2011; Label: Strange Music (SMI 97); Format: CD	—	—	52	—	1,727
2011	Big Scoob – No Filter: Released: September 20, 2011; Label: Strange Music (SMI 99); Format: CD	—	—	—	—	
2012	Tech N9ne – Klusterfuk: Released: March 13, 2012; Label: Strange Music (SMI 067); Format: CD	15	1	4	3	34,379
2012	¡Mayday! – Thrift Store Halos: Released: August 7, 2012; Label: Strange Music; Format: CD	124	20	21	16	3,588
2012	Ces Cru – 13: Released: August 28, 2012; Label: Strange Music; Format: CD	156	31	26	18	2,940
2012	Tech N9ne – E.B.A.H.: Released: September 18, 2012; Label: Strange Music; Format: CD	30	5	4	3	24,260
2012	Kutt Calhoun – Kelvin: Released: October 2, 2012; Label: Strange Music; Format: CD	—	41	28	21	2,715
2012	Stevie Stone – Momentum: Released: October 23, 2012; Label: Strange Music; Format: CD	196	45	27	22	2,400
2012	Tech N9ne – Boiling Point: Released: October 30, 2012; Label: Strange Music; Format: CD	30	4	5	3	21,043
2012	Krizz Kaliko – Neh'mind: Released: November 27, 2012; Label: Strange Music; Format: CD	—	16	29	16	5,497
2012	Prozak – Nocturnal: Released: December 11, 2012; Label: Strange Music; Format: CD	—	—	—	—	
2013	Tech N9ne – Therapy: Released: November 5, 2013; Label: Strange Music; Format: CD	32	5	4	6	10,000
2015	CES Cru – Recession Proof: Released: October 30, 2015; Label: Strange Music; Format: CD	-	35	26	19	
2016	Darrein Safron – The Brilliant EP: Released: March 11, 2016; Label: Strange Music; Format: CD	-	-	50	-	
2019	¡Mayday! – The Thinnest Line, Pt. II: Released: February 15, 2019; Label: Strange Music; Format: CD	-	-	-	-	
2020	Tech N9ne – MORE FEAR: Released: August 14, 2020; Label: Strange Music; Format: digital download	-	-	-	-	
2020	Tech N9ne - FEAR EXODUS: Released: October 23, 2020; Label: Strange Music; Format: digital download	-	-	-	-	
2021	Tech N9ne & HU$H - Blight: Released: June 4, 2021; Label: Strange Music; Format: CD					
2023	Tech N9ne Presents: NNUTTHOWZE - Siqnaling The Siqly: Released: October 31, 2023; Label: Strange Music (SMI 74); Format: CD					
"—" indicates EPs that did not chart. "—" with a light gray background indicates EPs not eligible for chart.

== Compilation and soundtrack releases ==
Year	Album details	Peak chart positions				Sales
Year	Album details	Billboard 200	Top Independent	Top R&B/Hip-Hop	Top Rap	Sales
2003	Beef (Soundtrack): Released: October 7, 2003; Label: Strange Music/MSC Entertainment (MSC1009); Format: CD & Bonus DVD	—	—	—	—N/a	
2005	Tech N9ne – Vintage Tech: Released: March 22, 2005; Label: Strange Music/MSC Entertainment (MSC-1012 2); Format: CD	—	19	63	—	89,000
2009	Tech N9ne – The Box Set: Released: October 13, 2009; Label: Strange Music; Format: Digital album	—	—	—	—	
"—" indicates albums that did not chart

== Mixtape releases ==
Year	Album details	Peak chart positions				Sales
Year	Album details	Billboard 200	Top Independent	Top R&B/Hip-Hop	Top Rap	Sales
2010	Jay Rock – Black Friday: Released: November 26, 2010; Label: Top Dawg Entertainment/Strange Music; Format: CD & Digital	—N/a	—N/a	—N/a	—N/a	—
2011	Tech N9ne – Bad Season: Released: January 25, 2011; Label: Strange Music (SMI 84); Format: CD & Digital	118	13	28	15	6,849
2012	Ubiquitous of Ces Cru – Matter Don't Money: Released: April 8, 2012; Label: Strange Music; Format: Digital	—N/a	—N/a	—N/a	—N/a	—
2012	Godemis of Ces Cru – The Deevil: Released: April 8, 2012; Label: Strange Music; Format: Digital	—N/a	—N/a	—N/a	—N/a	—
2012	Big Scoob – Dope Talk Vol. 1: Released: May 1, 2012; Label: Strange Music/Hogstyle Entertainment; Format: Digital	—N/a	—N/a	—N/a	—N/a	—
2012	Big Scoob – Dope Talk Vol. 2: Released: June 1, 2012; Label: Strange Music/Hogstyle Entertainment; Format: Digital	—N/a	—N/a	—N/a	—N/a	—
2012	¡Mayday! – Smash And Grab: Released: December 20, 2012; Label: Strange Music; Format: Digital	—N/a	—N/a	—N/a	—N/a	—
2013	Wrekonize – The Rooftops: Released: January 31, 2013; Label: Strange Music; Format: Digital	—N/a	—N/a	—N/a	—N/a	—
2016	Darrien Safron – Call Logs: Released: December 16, 2016; Label: Strange Music Inc.; Format: CD, Digital	—N/a	—N/a	—N/a	—N/a	–
"—" indicates albums that did not chart

== Video releases ==
Year	Video details	Peak chart positions	Sales
Year	Video details	Billboard Top Music Video	Sales
2004	Tech N9ne – T9X: The Tech N9ne Experience: Released: July 27, 2004; Label: Strange Music/MSC Entertainment (MSC1010); Format: DVD	—	13,148
2008	Tech N9ne – The Psychumentary: Released: April 8, 2008; Label: Strange Music (SMI 44); Format: DVD	7	8,826
2009	Tech N9ne – Tech N9ne: Strictly Strange: Released: September 22, 2009; Label: Strange Music (SMI 61); Format: DVD	—	
2010	Tech N9ne – K.O.D. Tour (Live in Kansas City): Released: May 18, 2010; Label: Strange Music (SMI 75); Format: DVD & Blu-ray	—	2,654
2011	Tech N9ne – EuroTech Tour: Released: July 12, 2011; Label: Strange Music; Format: DVD	—	
2011	Tech N9ne – The Video Collection: Released: November 18, 2011; Label: Strange Music; Format: DVD	—	
"—" indicates releases that did not chart.
