= Krizz Kaliko discography =

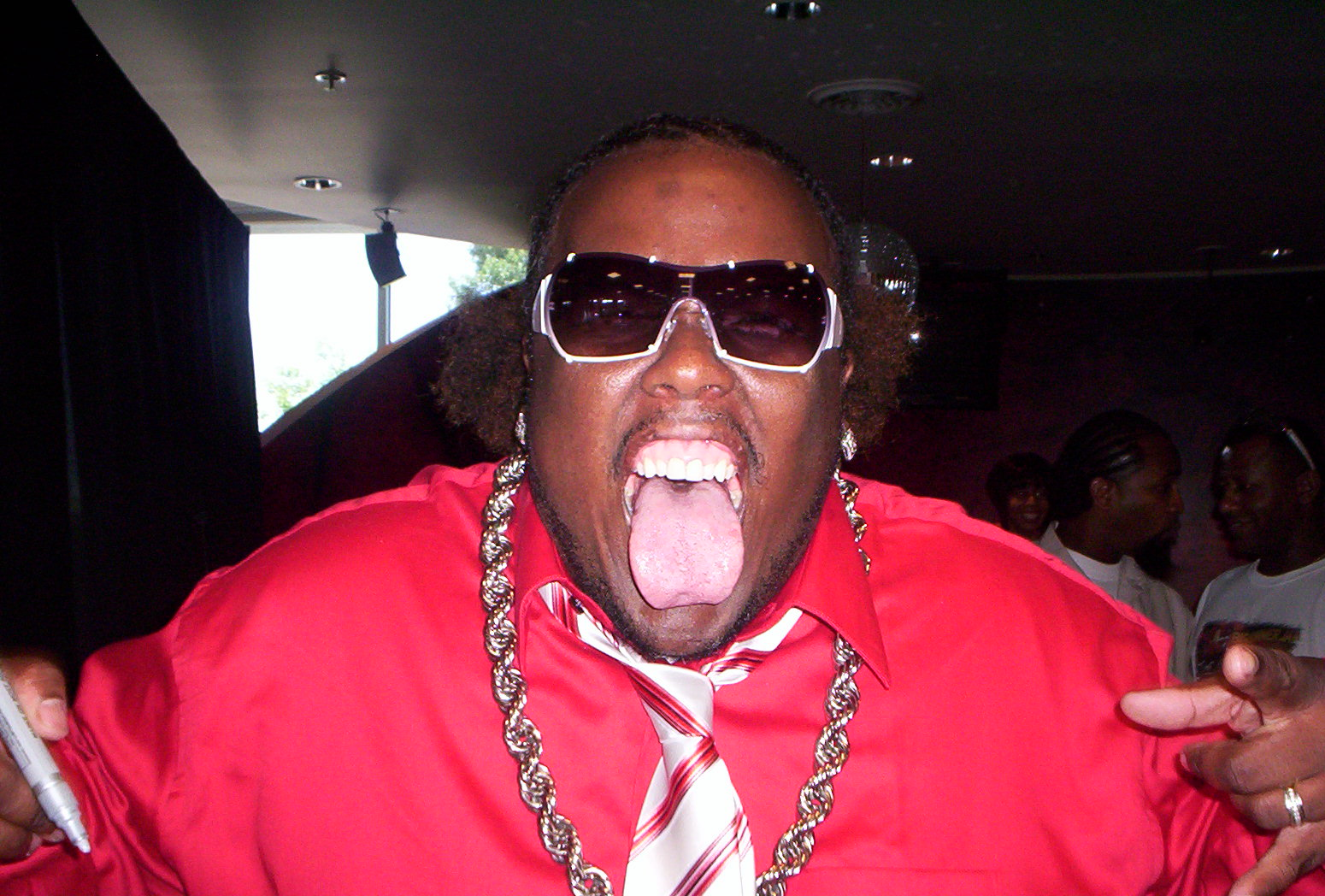
- Studio albums: 7
- EPs: 7
- Music videos: 41

American hip hop artist Krizz Kaliko has released seven studio albums, seven EPs and 41 music videos.

== Albums ==
=== Studio albums ===
Year	Album details	Peak chart positions				Sales
Year	Album details	Billboard 200	Top Independent	Top R&B/Hip-Hop	Top Rap	Sales
2008	Vitiligo: Released: May 6, 2008; Label: Strange Music; Format: CD, digital download	167	19	50	20	15,634
2009	Genius: Released: July 14, 2009; Label: Strange Music; Format: CD, digital download	85	12	14	3	10,000
2010	Shock Treatment: Released: September 14, 2010; Label: Strange Music; Format: CD, digital download	97	20	17	7	10,000
2012	Kickin' and Screamin': Released: May 15, 2012; Label: Strange Music; Format: CD, digital download	43	11	7	4	25,000
2013	Son of Sam: Released: August 27, 2013; Label: Strange Music; Format: CD, digital download	56	11	15	11	24,000
2016	GO: Released: April 8, 2016; Label: Strange Music; Format: CD, digital download	89	6	4	4	
2020	Legend: Released: September 18, 2020; Label: Strange Music; Format: CD, digital download	—	—	—	—	

== Extended plays ==
Year	EP details	Peak chart positions				Sales
Year	EP details	Billboard 200	Top Independent	Top R&B/Hip-Hop	Top Rap	Sales
2011	S.I.C.: Released: May 17, 2011; Label: Strange Music; Format: CD, digital download	-	42	42	22	1,080
2012	Neh'mind: Released: November 27, 2012; Label: Strange Music; Format: CD, digital download	161	16	29	16	3,800
2019	Immortal: Released: December 6, 2019; Label: Strange Music; Format: CD, digital download	—	46	—	—	
2020	Forever: Released: January 17, 2020; Label: Strange Music; Format: CD, digital download	—	—	—	—	
2020	Eternal: Released: March 13, 2020; Label: Strange Music; Format: CD, digital download	—	—	—	—	
2021	Wrapped Up '21: Released: December 18, 2021; Label: EarHouse Inc.; Format: CD, digital download	—	—	—	—	
2024	CHOP (with Vin Jay): Released: September 6, 2024; Label: Self-released; Format: digital download	—	—	—	—	
"—" indicates albums that did not chart.

== Guest appearances ==
List of non-single guest appearances, with other performing artists, showing year released and album name
Title	Year	Other artist(s)	Album
"Keep On Keepin' On"	2002	Tech N9ne	Absolute Power
"I'm a Playa"	2002	Tech N9ne	Absolute Power
"Hydro"	2002	Tech N9ne, Kutt Calhoun	Absolute Power
"The Grench"	2002	Tech N9ne, Boy Big	Absolute Power
"Hip Hop Warning"	2004	Kutt Calhoun	Absolute Power
"Nationality (Parlaa Remix)"	2004	Kutt Calhoun	B.L.E.V.E.
"Keep It Keeblur"	2004	Kutt Calhoun, Tech N9ne	B.L.E.V.E.
"Walk With a Limp"	2004	Kutt Calhoun	B.L.E.V.E.
"Got Plans"	2004	Kutt Calhoun	B.L.E.V.E.
"The Know How"	2004	Kutt Calhoun	B.L.E.V.E.
"N a Whitemanzeyez"	2004	Kutt Calhoun, Tech N9ne	B.L.E.V.E.
"My Life"	2004	Kutt Calhoun	B.L.E.V.E.
"Parlaa"	2004	Kutt Calhoun	B.L.E.V.E.
"Dat Nigga Dare"	2004	Kutt Calhoun	B.L.E.V.E.
"Get Ready"	2004	Kutt Calhoun, Grant Rice	—N/a
"Lapdance"	2004	Skatterman & Snug Brim, Tech N9ne	Urban Legendz
"Life In the Game"	2004	Skatterman & Snug Brim	Urban Legendz
"Kansas City (Concrete Jungle)"	2004	Skatterman & Snug Brim, Greed, Kutt Calhoun, BG Bulletwound	Urban Legendz
"Save Yourself"	2005	—N/a	Vintage Tech
"I'm a Playa" (Remix)	2005	Tech N9ne	Vintage Tech
"Snake Ya"	2005	Tech N9ne	Vintage Tech
"Real Life"	2005	Grave Plott	Puttin' U In
"No Can Do"	2006	Tech N9ne	Everready (The Religion)
"Welcome to the Midwest"	2006	Tech N9ne	Everready (The Religion)
"Fuck'em Girl"	2006	Tech N9ne, Kutt Calhoun	Everready (The Religion)
"Groupie"	2006	Tech N9ne, Kutt Calhoun	Everready (The Religion)
"Playa Like Me"	2006	Kutt Calhoun	Everready (The Religion)
"Let It Go"	2006	—N/a	Everready (The Religion)
"The Need"	2006	—N/a	Everready (The Religion)
"Midwest Choppers"	2007	Tech N9ne, D-Loc, Dalima	Misery Loves Kompany
"That Box"	2007	Tech N9ne, Greed, Kutt Calhoun, Skatterman & Snug Brim	Misery Loves Kompany
"Gangsta Shap"	2007	Tech N9ne, Kutt Calhoun	Misery Loves Kompany
"Sex Out South"	2007	Tech N9ne, Kutt Calhoun	Misery Loves Kompany
"Fan or Foe"	2007	Tech N9ne, T-Nutty	Misery Loves Kompany
"2 Piece"	2007	Tech N9ne, Big Scoob, Joe Vertigo	Misery Loves Kompany
"Yeah Ya Can"	2007	Tech N9ne, Shadow	Misery Loves Kompany
"You Don't Want It"	2007	Tech N9ne, Mr. Reece, Prozak	Misery Loves Kompany
"I'm da One"	2007	Kutt Calhoun	Flamez Mixtape
"Putcha On da Flamez"	2007	Kutt Calhoun	Flamez Mixtape
"We Can't Stop"	2007	Kutt Calhoun, 2Pac	Flamez Mixtape
"Bury 'Em All"	2007	Twiztid, Tech N9ne, Potluck	Independents Day
"City 2 City"	2007	Kottonmouth Kings, Tech N9ne	Cloud Nine
"Blackboy"	2008	Tech N9ne, Brother J, Ice Cube	Killer
"Drill Team"	2008	Tech N9ne, BG Bulletwound, Snug Brim	Killer
"Seven Words"	2008	Tech N9ne, Skatterman	Killer
"The Sexorcist (Infomercial)"	2008	Tech N9ne	Killer
"Enjoy"	2008	Tech N9ne, Bosko	Killer
"Can't Shake It"	2008	Tech N9ne, Robert Rebeck	Killer
"Holier Than Thou"	2008	Tech N9ne, Strange Lane Choir	Killer
"Get Your Attention"	2008	Tech N9ne, Gina McFadden	Killer
"Killer"	2008	Tech N9ne	Killer
"Smoke Sumting"	2008	Tech N9ne	Killer
"Stop Jeffin'"	2008	Kutt Calhoun, BG Bulletwound, Tech N9ne	Feature Presentation
"Good Friend"	2008	Kutt Calhoun	Feature Presentation
"School Daze"	2008	Kutt Calhoun, Tech N9ne	Feature Presentation
"Letter to My Kids"	2008	Kutt Calhoun	Feature Presentation
"Wipe That Sweat"	2008	Kutt Calhoun, DJ Chill	Feature Presentation
"Smilin' Faces"	2008	Kutt Calhoun	Feature Presentation
"Exclusive"	2008	Kutt Calhoun	—N/a
"Freestyle 101"	2008	Kutt Calhoun, Tech N9ne	—N/a
"Party Rock"	2008	Kutt Calhoun	—N/a
"Keep Grindin'"	2008	Prozak	Tales from the Sick
"It Was You"	2008	Prozak	Tales from the Sick
"Run Away"	2008	Prozak, Tech N9ne	Tales from the Sick
"Fading..."	2008	Prozak, Twiztid	Tales from the Sick
"Under the Rain"	2008	Prozak	Tales from the Sick
"Heartbreaker"	2008	Skatterman & Snug Brim, Tech N9ne	Word on tha Streetz
"Salute"	2008	Tech N9ne, Big Scoob	Draped Up & Chipped Out, Vol. 3
"Ghetto Love"	2009	Tech N9ne, Kutt Calhoun	Sickology 101
"Dysfunctional"	2009	Tech N9ne, Big Scoob	Sickology 101
"Far Away"	2009	Tech N9ne	Sickology 101
"Strange Music Box"	2009	Tech N9ne, Brotha Lynch Hung	K.O.D.
"Hunterish"	2009	Tech N9ne, Irv da Phenom	K.O.D.
"The Martini"	2009	Tech N9ne	K.O.D.
"Monsterifik"	2009	Big Scoob, Tech N9ne	Monsterifik
"Only Know Hard"	2009	Big Scoob, 8Ball & MJG	Monsterifik
"Brand New Day"	2009	Big Scoob	Monsterifik
"Reflektions"	2009	Big Scoob	Monsterifik
"D-Boy"	2009	Big Scoob	Monsterifik
"Street Life"	2009	Big Scoob, Mr. Whitebear, Txx Will	Monsterifik
"Let Me Holla At Cha"	2009	Big Scoob, Kutt Calhoun	Monsterifik
"Stik @ Move"	2009	Big Scoob, Mr. Whitebear, Tech N9ne, Txx Will	Monsterifik
"Freaks of the Industry"	2009	Big Scoob, Kutt Calhoun, Tech N9ne	Monsterifik
"Murda Iz tha Time (Part 2)"	2009	Grave Plott	The Plott Thickens
"Need a Change"	2009	Grave Plott	The Plott Thickens
"She Don't Wanna Fuck Wit Me"	2009	Potluck	Pipe Dreams
"Be Easy"	2009	Potluck	Pipe Dreams
"Gain Green"	2009	Messy Marv, Tech N9ne, Big Scoob	Draped Up and Chipped Out, Vol. 4
"Summ' Like a Pimp"	2009	Paul Wall, Tech N9ne	Fast Life
"Like I Died" (Remix)	2010	Tech N9ne, Craig Smith	The Lost Scripts of K.O.D.
"Pain Killer"	2010	Tech N9ne	The Lost Scripts of K.O.D.
"Last Sad Song"	2010	Tech N9ne	The Lost Scripts of K.O.D.
"F U Pay Me"	2010	Tech N9ne, Makzilla	The Gates Mixed Plate
"Gamer"	2010	Tech N9ne, Kutt Calhoun	The Gates Mixed Plate
"Jumpin' Jax"	2010	Tech N9ne, Stevie Stone, Bishop Young Don	The Gates Mixed Plate
"What's Next"	2010	Tech N9ne, Craig Smith, Oobergeek	The Gates Mixed Plate
"Too Many Girls"	2010	Tech N9ne, Sundae	The Gates Mixed Plate
"KC Tea"	2010	Tech N9ne	The Gates Mixed Plate
"Paper With Brian B Shynin (Intro)"	2010	Tech N9ne, Jay Rock, Joe Vertigo	The Gates Mixed Plate
"Asshole"	2010	Tech N9ne, Big Scoob	Seepage EP
"Trippin' Comin'"	2010	Tech N9ne	Seepage EP
"Sex to the Beat"	2010	Tech N9ne, Bizzy, Kutt Calhoun	Bad Season
"No More Music by the Suckas"	2010	Black Vain, Tech N9ne, Oobergeek	Bad Season
"Bad Season"	2010	Tech N9ne, Nesto, Tonesha Sanders	Bad Season
"Somethin' to See"	2010	Tech N9ne, Irv da Phenom	Bad Season
"Ego Trippin'"	2010	Tech N9ne	Bad Season
"All Day All Night"	2010	Tech N9ne	Bad Season
"Livin' Like I'm Dyin'"	2010	Tech N9ne, Kutt Calhoun, Ces Cru	Bad Season
"Lick Your Teeth"	2010	Tech N9ne, Irv da Phenom, Tonesha Sanders	Bad Season
"Naked (Boom Boom Room)"	2010	Kutt Calhoun, Tech N9ne	Raw and Un-Kutt
"Don't Worry Momma, It's Just Bleeding"	2010	Brotha Lynch Hung, Tech N9ne, First Degree the D.E.	Dinner and a Movie
"Kill or Be Killed"	2010	Jay Rock, Tech N9ne	Follow Me Home
"Violated"	2010	Cognito, Tech N9ne	Automatic
"Born 2 Be Fly"	2010	Cognito, Tech N9ne	Automatic
"Pain"	2010	Cognito	Automatic
"Streets Keep Callin' Me"	2010	E-40, B-Slimm	Revenue Retrievin': Night Shift
"I Love Music"	2011	Tech N9ne, Kendrick Lamar, Oobergeek	All 6's and 7's
"Fuck Food"	2011	Tech N9ne, Lil Wayne, T-Pain	All 6's and 7's
"Pornographic"	2011	Tech N9ne, E-40, Snoop Dogg	All 6's and 7's
"Eenie Meanie Miny Ho"	2011	Tech N9ne, Wide Frame	All 6's and 7's
"Welcome to Strangeland"	2011	Tech N9ne	Welcome to Strangeland
"Unfair"	2011	Tech N9ne, Ces Cru	Welcome to Strangeland
"Slave"	2011	Tech N9ne, Kutt Calhoun	Welcome to Strangeland
"Gods"	2011	Tech N9ne, Kutt Calhoun	Welcome to Strangeland
"EMJ"	2011	Tech N9ne, Irv da Phenom, Kutt Calhoun, ¡Mayday!, Stevie Stone, Jay Rock, Magnum PI	Welcome to Strangeland
"All I Kno Is Hood"	2011	Big Scoob	Damn Fool
"Lemonade Delight"	2011	Big Scoob, Crystal Watson	Damn Fool
"White Bitch"	2011	Big Scoob, Irv da Phenom	Damn Fool
"Twistin' Yay"	2011	Big Scoob, Skatterman, Rappin' Twan	Damn Fool
"Dead-a-Man"	2011	Big Scoob	Damn Fool
"2 Fat Fucks"	2011	Big Scoob	Damn Fool
"If U Kall"	2011	Big Scoob, Irv da Phenom, Big Rich	Damn Fool
"Spotlight"	2011	Big Scoob, Tech N9ne	Damn Fool
"Body Moves Slow"	2011	Baby Bash, Paul Wall	Bashtown
"Forgive Me"	2011	Winnipeg's Most	Goodfellaz
"Can't Stand Me"	2012	Tech N9ne	Klusterfuk
"D.K.N.Y."	2012	Tech N9ne	Klusterfuk
"KJOMD"	2012	Tech N9ne	E.B.A.H.
"Fire In AC"	2012	Tech N9ne, Smackola	Boiling Point
"Alone"	2012	Tech N9ne, Ezikuhl	Boiling Point
"One of These Days"	2012	Prozak, Tech N9ne	Paranormal
"In the Dark"	2012	Big Scoob, Blind Fury	Dope Talk Volume 2
"It's Over"	2012	Ces Cru, Tech N9ne	13
"Last Days"	2012	¡Mayday!	Take Me to Your Leader
"Cast Out"	2012	Stevie Stone	Rollin' Stone
"Blapper"	2012	T-Pain, Mistah F.A.B., Tech N9ne	Stoic
"Sux 2 B U"	2012	Twiztid, Glasses Malone	Abominationz
"Straight Out the Gate"	2013	Tech N9ne, Serj Tankian	Something Else
"My Haiku-Burn the World"	2013	Tech N9ne	Something Else
"Colorado"	2013	Tech N9ne, B.o.B, Ces Cru, ¡Mayday!, Rittz, Stevie Stone	Something Else
"Somebody Else"	2013	Tech N9ne	Something Else
"Feels Like Heaven"	2013	Tech N9ne, Oobergeek	Something Else
"Public School"	2013	Tech N9ne	Therapy
"Self Preservation"	2013	Kutt Calhoun	Black Gold
"Heart 2 Heart"	2013	Kutt Calhoun	Black Gold
"Get Out My Face"	2013	Stevie Stone	2 Birds 1 Stone
"Phases"	2013	Stevie Stone	2 Birds 1 Stone
"Boomerang"	2013	Stevie Stone	2 Birds 1 Stone
"Say No More"	2013	Rittz, Tech N9ne	The Life and Times of Jonny Valiant
"Tug of War"	2013	Andy Mineo	Heroes for Sale
"Holla-Loo-Yuh"	2013	R.A. the Rugged Man, Tech N9ne	Legends Never Die
"Public School"	2013	Tech N9ne	Therapy
"Make Waves"	2014	Tech N9ne, Rittz, Tyler Lyon	Strangeulation
"Nobody Cares: (The Remix)"	2014	Tech N9ne, Wrekonize, Godemis, Bernz, Ubiquitous, Stevie Stone	Strangeulation
"Stink"	2014	Stevie Stone, Tech N9ne, Kendall Morgan	Strangeulation
"Strangeulation IV"	2014	Rittz, Prozak, Big Scoob	Strangeulation
"Straight Out the Gate: (The Scott Stevens Remix)"	2014	Tech N9ne, John 5, Serj Tankian	Strangeulation
"Withdrawal"	2014	Tech N9ne	Strangeulation
"Nobody Cares"	2014	Tech N9ne, Stevie Stone	Strangeulation
"Shroud"	2015	Tech N9ne	Special Effects
"No K"	2015	Tech N9ne, E-40	Special Effects
"Speedom (WWC2)"	2015	Tech N9ne, Eminem	Special Effects
"Give It All"	2015	Tech N9ne, Audio Push	Special Effects
"Life Sentences"	2015	Tech N9ne, Joey Cool, Gee Watts	Special Effects
"Dyin' Flyin'"	2015	Tech N9ne	Special Effects
"Anti"	2015	Tech N9ne, Band of Psychos	Special Effects
"Rush"	2015	Rap Monster	RM
"Slow to Me"	2015	Tech N9ne, Rittz	Strangeulation Vol. II
"Strangeulation Vol. II Cypher IV"	2015	Rittz, Prozak	Strangeulation Vol. II
"Wake and Bake"	2015	Tech N9ne, ¡Mayday!	Strangeulation Vol. II
"Purgatory"	2015	Prozak, Tech N9ne	Black Ink
"Tomorrow"	2015	Prozak, Tech N9ne	Black Ink
"Killing Me"	2015	Prozak, Zodiac MPrint	Black Ink
"Erbody But Me"	2016	Tech N9ne, Bizzy	The Storm
"I Get It Now"	2016	Tech N9ne	The Storm
"No Gun Control"	2016	Tech N9ne, Gary Clark Jr.	The Storm
"What If It Was Me"	2016	Tech N9ne	The Storm
"The Needle"	2016	Tech N9ne	The Storm
"Quasars"	2016	Big Scoob	H.O.G.
"The Formula"	2016	Rittz, Tech N9ne	Top of the Line
"Drama"	2017	Tech N9ne	Dominion
"Nevermind Me"	2017	Tech N9ne, Stevie Stone, Mackinize Nicole	Dominion
"The Answer"	2017	Tech N9ne, Ces Cru	Dominion
"Fish In A Pita"	2017	Tech N9ne	Dominion
"Morning Til The Nightfall"	2017	Tech N9en, Rittz, Wrekonize	Dominion
"Jesus And A Pill"	2017	Tech N9ne, Prozak	Dominion
"Angels In The Playground"	2017	Tech N9ne, Stevie Stone	Dominion
"Cold Piece Of Work"	2017	Tech N9ne, JL	Dominion
"Minimize"	2017	Tech N9ne, Stevie Stone	Strange Reign
"Come Down"	2017	Tech N9ne, Stevie Stone	Strange Reign
"Stick It In"	2017	Tech N9ne	Strange Reign
"Plenty"	2017	Tech N9ne, Ces Cru	Strange Reign
"Face Down"	2017	Tech N9ne	Strange Reign
"We Burn"	2017	Tech N9ne, Darrein Safron	Strange Reign
"Elevated"	2017	JL, Adrian Truth, Emilio Rojas, Joey Cool	DIBIKIS
"Wavelength"	2017	Stevie Stone, Bossiemossie	Level Up
"I Got It"	2017	Stevie Stone	Level Up
"Another Round"	2017	Murs	Captain California
"Hangout"	2017	Ces Cru	Catastrophic Event Specialists
"Red Byers (Say Som'n Do Som'n)"	2018	Tech N9ne	Planet
"Bad Habbits"	2018	JL, Stevie Stone, Nave Monjo	Kontra-Band
"Don't Let Me Fall"	2019	Tech N9ne	N9na
"You Line!"	2019	Tech N9ne	N9na
"Rata"	2019	Tech N9ne	N9na
"Active"	2019	Tech N9ne	N9na
"EF U (Easier for You)"	2019	Tech N9ne, Jelly Roll	N9na
"Madness (Remix)"	2019	Ubiquitous, Tech N9ne, ¡Mayday!, Info Gates	Under Bad Influence
"Til Further Notice"	2019	Joey Cool	Old Habits Die Hard
"Best Out"	2019	Chris Webby	Wednesday After Next
"Creature"	2020	JellyRoll, Tech N9ne	A Beautiful Disaster
"Speed of Darkness"	2020	King Iso, C-Mob	World War Me
"Suckseed (Intro 2)"	2020	Tech N9ne, King Iso	Enterfear
"Questions Mark This"	2020	Tech N9ne, Lex Bratcher	Enterfear
"Smell Good"	2020	Tech N9ne	Enterfear
"B.I.B."	2020	Tech N9ne	Enterfear
"Saw Somethin"	2020	Tech N9ne, King Iso	Enterfear
"KC Smile"	2020	Tech N9ne	Enterfear
"I Don't Give A Pho"	2020	Tech N9ne	MORE FEAR
"Inside"	2020	Tech N9ne	MORE FEAR
"Promise Ring"	2020	Saigon, Milan Amor	777: The Resurrection
"Hallelujah"	2020	Dee-1, Murs	He's the Christian, I'm the Rapper
"Good Morning"	2020	JL	The Devil Hates Sundays
"Sleep on Me"	2020	JL	The Devil Hates Sundays
"Go There"	2020	Joey Cool	Coolie High
"I Think"	2020	Tech N9ne, Bernz, Godemis, Jehry Robinson, JL, Joey Cool, King Iso, Maez301, Stevie Stone, UBI, Wrekonize	FEAR EXODUS
"Sprocket"	2020	Tech N9ne	FEAR EXODUS
"Free"	2022	Don Bigg	Arba3in

== Music videos ==
Year	Title	Director	Artist(s)
As main performer
2009	"Misunderstood"	Dan Gedman	—N/a
2010	"Elevator"	Dan Gedman	featuring Tech N9ne
2012	"Hello Walls"	Dan Gedman	featuring Tech N9ne
2012	"Spaz"	Krizz Kaliko	featuring Tech N9ne
2012	"Mayday"	Krizz Kaliko	—N/a
2012	"Unstable"	Krizz Kaliko	—N/a
2012	"Kill Shit"	Krizz Kaliko	—N/a
2012	"Dancin With Myself"	Krizz Kaliko	—N/a
2012	"Stay Alive"	Krizz Kaliko	—N/a
2012	"Dixie Cup"	Krizz Kaliko	—N/a
2012	"Species"	Krizz Kaliko	—N/a
2012	"Abu Dhabi"	Krizz Kaliko	featuring 816 Boyz
2013	"Intro"	Krizz Kaliko	—N/a
2013	"W.A.N.S. (We All Need Sex)"	Krizz Kaliko	—N/a
2013	"Girls Like That"	Krizz Kaliko	featuring Bizzy
2013	"Scars"	Krizz Kaliko	featuring Tech N9ne
2013	"Schizophrenia"	Krizz Kaliko	—N/a
2013	"Why Me"	Krizz Kaliko	—N/a
2013	"Night Time"	Krizz Kaliko	—N/a
2014	"Kill For Your Lovin'"	Krizz Kaliko	featuring Crystal Watson
As featured performer
2007	"City 2 City"		Kottonmouth Kings ft. Krizz Kaliko & Tech N9ne
2010	"Ego Trippin'"	Dan The Man	Tech N9ne ft. Krizz Kaliko
2011	"All I Kno Is Hood"	Dan Gedman	Big Scoob ft. Krizz Kaliko
Cameo appearances
2002	"Slacker"	Ben Mor	Tech N9ne
2003	"Imma Tell"	Christopher Horvath	Tech N9ne
2004	"Rap Game"	Gobi M. Rahimi	MC Breed
2006	"Bout Ta' Bubble"	Prozak	Tech N9ne
2007	"White Trash Life"	Bryan Heiden	Big B
2008	"Like Yeah"	Estevan Oriol	Tech N9ne
2009	"Bunk Rock Bitch"	Dan Gedman	Kutt Calhoun
2009	"Red Nose"	Dan Gedman	Tech N9ne
2009	"Salue"		Big Scoob ft. Tech N9ne
2009	"Leave Me Alone"	Dan Gedman	Tech N9ne
2009	"Low"	Dan Gedman	Tech N9ne
2010	"Naked (Boom Boom Room)"	Dan Gedman	Kutt Calhoun ft. Tech N9ne
2010	"O.G."	Dan Gedman	Tech N9ne
2010	"KC Tea"	Dan Gedman	Tech N9ne
2010	"Last Call"		Txx Will
2010	"Red and Yellow"		Irv Da Phenom ft. B Double E & Cash Image
2011	"Hotboxin The Van"	Bert Trevino	Baby Bash, Marcus Manchild & Paul Wall
2012	"All That I Know"	Philly Fly Boy	Trae ft. Brian Angel, Mystikal & Tech N9ne
