= Kutt Calhoun discography =

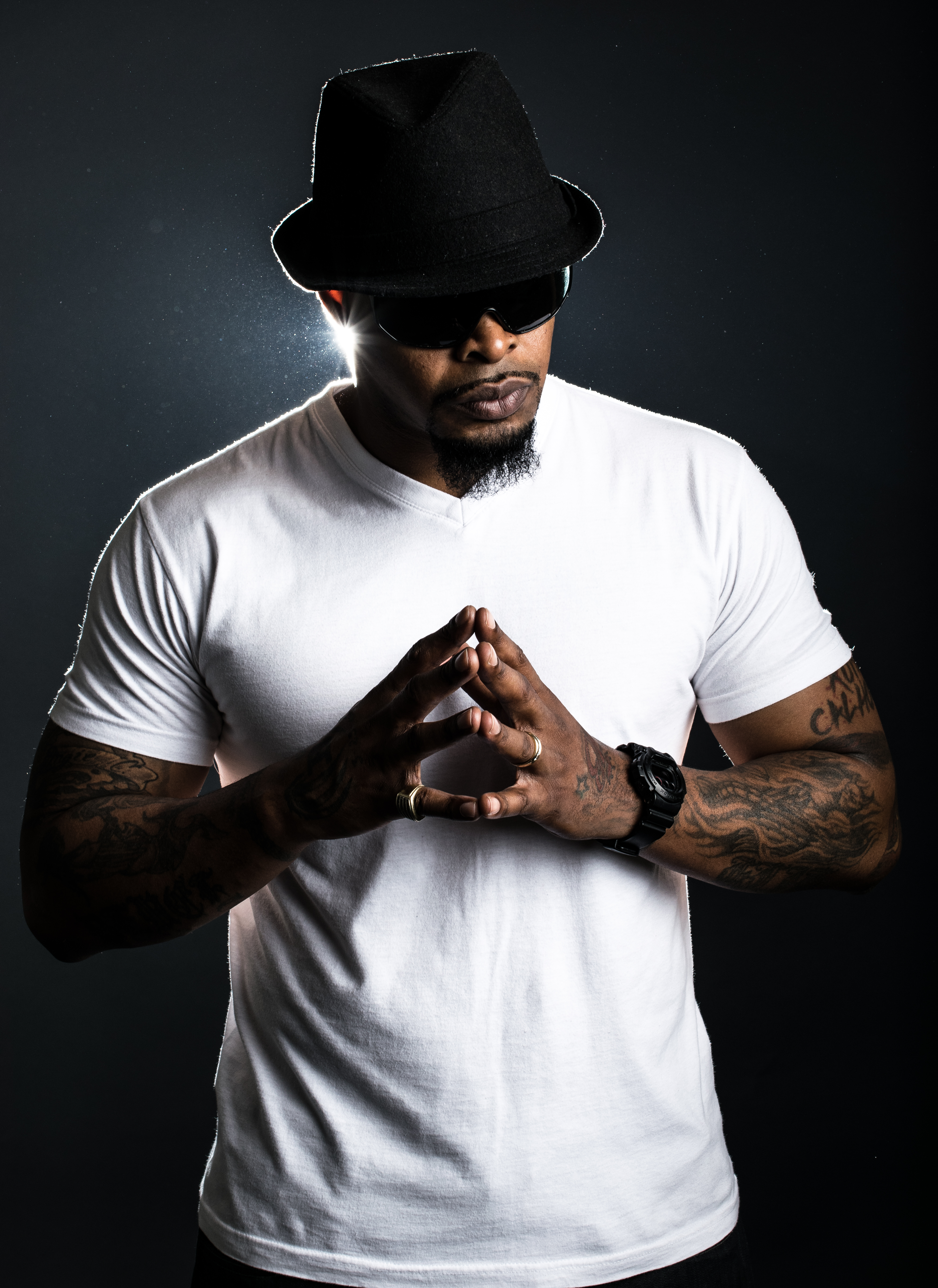
- Studio albums: 6
- EPs: 4

The discography of Kutt Calhoun, an American rapper, consists of six studio albums and four extended plays.

== Albums ==
=== Studio albums ===
List of studio albums, with selected chart positions
| Title | Album details | Peak chart positions | | | | |
| Title | Album details | US | Heat | US Ind | US R&B | US Rap |
|---|---|---|---|---|---|---|
| B.L.E.V.E. | Released: August 10, 2004; Label: Strange Music; Format: CD, digital download | — | — | — | — | — |
| Feature Presentation | Released: October 7, 2008; Label: Strange Music; Format: CD, digital download | — | 19 | 60 | — | — |
| Raw and Un-Kutt | Released: June 8, 2010; Label: Strange Music; Format: CD, digital download | 170 | 6 | 28 | 27 | 15 |
| Black Gold | Released: February 26, 2013; Label: Strange Music; Format: CD, digital download | 120 | 1 | 13 | 25 | 22 |
| Persona Non Grata: Truth Be Told | Released: May 7, 2019; Label: Black Gold; Format: CD, digital download | — | — | — | — | — |
| T.D.I.A.L. | Released: September 27, 2024; Label: Black Gold; Format: Digital download | — | — | — | — | — |

== Extended plays ==
List of studio EPs, with selected chart positions
| Title | EP details | Peak chart positions | | | | |
| Title | EP details | US | Heat | US Ind | US R&B | US Rap |
|---|---|---|---|---|---|---|
| Red-Headed Stepchild | Released: August 7, 2011; Label: Strange Music; Format: CD, digital download | — | 23 | — | 52 | — |
| Kelvin | Released: October 2, 2012; Label: Strange Music; Format: CD, digital download | — | 8 | 41 | 28 | 21 |
| Kuttin Loose | Released: July 10, 2015; Label: Black Gold; Format: CD, digital download | — | 16 | — | 41 | — |
| Residue | Released: March 3, 2023; Label: Black Gold; Format: Digital download | — | — | — | — | — |

== Mixtapes ==
| Title | Mixtape details |
|---|---|
| Flamez | Released: September 18, 2007; Label: Self-released; Format: CD |

== Guest appearances ==
List of non-single guest appearances, with other performing artists, showing year released and album name
| Title | Year | Other artist(s) | Album |
|---|---|---|---|
| "Bianca's and Beatrice's" | 2002 | Tech N9ne | Absolute Power |
| "Freaky Lil Things" | 2002 | Tech N9ne, Grant Rice | Absolute Power |
| "Hydro" | 2002 | Tech N9ne, Krizz Kaliko | Absolute Power |
| "Shocked" | 2002 | Tech N9ne | Absolute Power |
| "Walk With a Limp" | 2002 | Krizz Kaliko | Absolute Power |
| "Carwash" | 2004 | Skatterman & Snug Brim, BG Bulletwound | Urban Legendz |
| "Crazy" | 2004 | Skatterman & Snug Brim | Urban Legendz |
| "Mafioso" | 2004 | Skatterman & Snug Brim, Greed, Tech N9ne | Urban Legendz |
| "Pakman" | 2004 | Skatterman & Snug Brim | Urban Legendz |
| "Kansas City (Concrete Jungle)" | 2004 | Skatterman & Snug Brim, Greed, Krizz Kaliko, BG Bulletwound | Urban Legendz |
| "Fuck'em Girl" | 2006 | Tech N9ne, Krizz Kaliko | Everready (The Religion) |
| "Groupie" | 2006 | Tech N9ne, Krizz Kaliko | Everready (The Religion) |
| "Whip It" | 2006 | Tech N9ne | Everready (The Religion) |
| "Playa Like Me" | 2006 | Krizz Kaliko | Everready (The Religion) |
| "That Box" | 2007 | Tech N9ne, Greed, Krizz Kaliko, Skatterman & Snug Brim | Misery Loves Kompany |
| "Gangsta Shap" | 2007 | Tech N9ne, Krizz Kaliko | Misery Loves Kompany |
| "Sex Out South" | 2007 | Tech N9ne, Krizz Kaliko | Misery Loves Kompany |
| "Keep It Simple" | 2007 | Blaze Ya Dead Homie, Big B | Clockwork Gray |
| "Too Much" | 2008 | Tech N9ne | Killer |
| "Let's Go" | 2008 | Tech N9ne, Mistah F.A.B. | Killer |
| "Crew Cut" | 2008 | Krizz Kaliko, BG Bulletwound, Makzilla, Skatterman & Snug Brim, Tech N9ne | Vitiligo |
| "Collect" | 2008 | Krizz Kaliko | Vitiligo |
| "Where You Want Me" | 2008 | Krizz Kaliko, Tech N9ne | Vitiligo |
| "In the Streets" | 2008 | Grave Plott, BG Bulletwound, Skatterman & Snug Brim | The Plott Thickens |
| "G-Shit" | 2008 | Grave Plott | The Plott Thickens |
| "Help Me Change" | 2008 | Skatterman & Snug Brim, Vance LaRoy | Word On tha Streets |
| "Bodies Fall" | 2008 | Prozak, Tech N9ne, Zodiac MPrint | Tales from the Sick |
| "Ghetto Love" | 2009 | Tech N9ne, Krizz Kaliko | Sickology 101 |
| "Poh Me Anutha" | 2009 | Tech N9ne, Potluck | Sickology 101 |
| "So High" | 2009 | Krizz Kaliko, Tech N9ne | Genius |
| "She'll Do" | 2009 | Krizz Kaliko, DJ Chill | Genius |
| "B. Boy" | 2009 | Tech N9ne, Big Scoob, Bumpy Knuckles, Skatterman | K.O.D. |
| "Let Me Holla At Cha" | 2009 | Big Scoob, Krizz Kaliko | Monsterifik |
| "Freaks of the Industry" | 2009 | Big Scoob, Krizz Kaliko, Tech N9ne | Monsterifik |
| "Gamer" | 2010 | Tech N9ne, Krizz Kaliko | The Gates Mixed Plate |
| "Pow Wow" | 2010 | Tech N9ne, Mon. E.G. the Ghostwriter, Riv Locc, Tay Diggs | The Gates Mixed Plate |
| "Afterparty" | 2010 | Tech N9ne, Devin the Dude | The Gates Mixed Plate |
| "Sex to the Beat" | 2010 | Tech N9ne, Bizzy, Krizz Kaliko | Bad Season |
| "Livin' Like I'm Dyin'" | 2010 | Tech N9ne, Ces Cru, Krizz Kaliko | Bad Season |
| "Down For the Block" | 2010 | Jay Rock, Big Scoob, Tech N9ne | Bad Season |
| "Ack-a-Donkey" | 2010 | Krizz Kaliko | Shock Treatment |
| "Tonight" | 2010 | Krizz Kaliko, Tech N9ne | Shock Treatment |
| "Stranger" | 2010 | Cognito, Tech N9ne, Big Scoob, Loki, Stevie Stone | Automatic |
| "You Owe Like Pookie" | 2011 | Tech N9ne, Jay Rock | All 6's and 7's |
| "Kocky" | 2011 | Tech N9ne, Jay Rock | Welcome to Strangeland |
| "Slave" | 2011 | Tech N9ne, Krizz Kaliko | Welcome to Strangeland |
| "Gods" | 2011 | Tech N9ne, Krizz Kaliko | Welcome to Strangeland |
| "EMJ" | 2011 | Tech N9ne, Irv da Phenom, ¡Mayday!, Stevie Stone, Jay Rock, Krizz Kaliko, Magnum PI | Welcome to Strangeland |
| "Keep My Name Out Your Mouth" | 2012 | Stevie Stone | Rollin' Stone |
| "Jump" | 2012 | Stevie Stone, Spaide Ripper | Momentum |
| "That's My Kid" | 2013 | Tech N9ne, Big K.R.I.T., Cee-Lo Green | Something Else |
| "Hush" | 2013 | Stevie Stone, Brotha Lynch Hung | 2 Birds 1 Stone |
| "Red Rags" | 2014 | Tech N9ne, Jay Rock, Big Scoob | Strangeulation |
| "Strangeulation III" | 2014 | Wrekonize, Bernz, Ubiquitous | Strangeulation |
| "Dope Game" | 2019 | Luni Coleone | Post Mortem |

== Music videos ==
| Year | Title | Director | Artist(s) |
As main performer
| 2009 | "Bunk Rock Bitch" | Dan Gedman | Kutt Calhoun |
| 2010 | "Naked (Boom Boom Room)" | Dan Gedman | Kutt Calhoun ft. Tech N9ne |
| 2011 | "I'm The One" | Frankie C | Kutt Calhoun ft. JL |
| 2011 | "All By My Lonely" | Frankie C | Kutt Calhoun ft. BG Bulletwound |
| 2012 | "Bottle Service" | Anthony Devera | Kutt Calhoun |
| 2012 | "Strange $" | Anthony Devera | Kutt Calhoun |
As featured performer
| 2010 | "In My Hood" | Nathan Letteer | Young Ghost ft. Bridge_B & Kutt Calhoun |
| 2011 | "Pressure" | Tye Murphy | Black Oxygen ft. Kutt Calhoun |
| 2011 | "Ooo Wee" | Nathan Letteer | Steel ft. Kutt Calhoun |
Cameo appearances
| 2002 | "Slacker" | Ben Mor | Tech N9ne |
| 2003 | "Imma Tell" | Christopher Horvath | Tech N9ne |
| 2006 | "Bout Ta' Bubble" | Prozak | Tech N9ne |
| 2007 | "City 2 City" | | Kottonmouth Kings ft. Krizz Kaliko & Tech N9ne |
| 2007 | "White Trash Life" | Bryan Heiden | Big B |
| 2008 | "What It Is" | RUBONYX | Kredulous ft. 3rd Degree |
| 2008 | "Like Yeah" | Estevan Oriol | Tech N9ne |
| 2009 | "Red Nose" | Dan Gedman | Tech N9ne |
| 2009 | "Salue" | | Big Scoob ft. Tech N9ne |
| 2010 | "O.G." | Dan Gedman | Tech N9ne |
| 2010 | "KC Tea" | Dan Gedman | Tech N9ne |
| 2010 | "Elevator" | Dan Gedman | Krizz Kaliko ft. Tech N9ne |
| 2010 | "Ego Trippin'" | Dan The Man | Tech N9ne ft. Krizz Kaliko |
| 2011 | "Man In My City (Remix)" | Kamera Man | Nesto the Owner ft. Bishop Young Don, Cash Image, Rondoe, The Popper, V.V. & Xta-C |
| 2011 | "Hotboxin The Van" | Bert Trevino | Baby Bash, Marcus Manchild & Paul Wall |
| 2012 | "All That I Know" | Philly Fly Boy | Trae ft. Brian Angel, Mystikal & Tech N9ne |
| 2013 | "The Reason" | | Stevie Stone ft. Spaide Ripper |
| 2013 | "Salute Me" | | Tali Blanco ft. Tech N9ne |
| 2013 | "Party The Pain Away" | | Tech N9ne ft. Liz Suwandi |
