= E.B.A.H. =

EP by Tech N9ne
- Released: September 18, 2012
- Recorded: 2012
- Genre: Hip-hop
- Length: 27:09
- Label: Strange Music
- Producer: Ben Cybulsky, JMAC, Seven

Tech N9ne chronology
Klusterfuk (2012)	E.B.A.H. (2012)	Boiling Point (2012)

Professional ratings
Review scores
Source	Rating
Spill Magazine	4/5

E.B.A.H. (an acronym for "Evil Brain Angel Heart".) is the fourth EP by rapper Tech N9ne. It was released on September 18, 2012. It debuted on the Billboard 200 at #31, selling 14,000 copies in its first week.

== Background ==
After completing the longest tour in hip-hop history, the Hostile Takeover Tour 2012, Tech N9ne immediately returned to the studio to record his fourth EP release, E.B.A.H.

== Guest artists ==
Guest appearances on the EP include Krizz Kaliko, J.L. of B. Hood & 816 Boyz, one of Tech N9ne's groups that includes Kaliko, Makzilla and Kutt Calhoun.

== Track listing ==
No.	Title	Writer(s)	Producer(s)	Length
1.	"E.B.A.H. Landing (Skit)"	A. Yates	Seven, Ben Cybulsky	0:04
2.	"E.B.A.H."	A. Yates	Seven	4:02
3.	"Earregular"	A. Yates	Seven	3:41
4.	"Don't Tweet This"	A. Yates	Seven	3:29
5.	"Rock Yo Head" (featuring 816 Boyz)	A. Yates, M. Queen, S. Watson, M. Calhoun	JMAC	3:28
6.	"Next Message (Skit)"	A. Yates	Ben Cybulsky	0:13
7.	"Boy Toy"	A. Yates, R. Gordon	Seven	3:06
8.	"KJOMD" (featuring Krizz Kaliko)	A. Yates, S. Watson	Seven	3:58
9.	"A Real 1" (featuring JL)	A. Yates, J. Varnes	Seven	4:59
10.	"Shut the Fuck Up (Skit)"	A. Yates	Seven, Ben Cybulsky	0:09
Total length:				27:09
