= Neh'mind =

EP by Krizz Kaliko
- Released: November 27, 2012
- Recorded: 2012
- Genre: Hip-hop
- Length: 27:26
- Label: Strange Music
- Producer: JMAC; Seven; Young Fyre; Nico Marchese

Krizz Kaliko chronology
S.I.C. (2011)	Neh'mind (2012)	Immortal (2019)

Neh'mind is the second extended play by American rapper Krizz Kaliko. It was released on November 27, 2012, via Strange Music. Produced by Seven, Young Fyre, JMAC and Nico Marchese, it featured guest appearances from 816 Boyz, Oobergeek and Snow Tha Product.

In the United States, the album peaked at number 161 on the Top Current Album Sales, number 29 on the Top R&B/Hip-Hop Albums and number 16 on both the Top Rap Albums and the Independent Albums charts, with first-week sales of 3,800 copies.

== Track listing ==
No.	Title	Writer(s)	Producer(s)	Length
1.	"Knock Ya Wig"	Samuel Watson; Michael Summers	Seven	3:26
2.	"Damage" (featuring Snow Tha Product)	Watson; Claudia Feliciano; Tramaine Winfrey	Young Fyre	2:48
3.	"Way Out"	Watson; Summers	Seven	3:27
4.	"Gumbo" (featuring Oobergeek)	Watson; Marcus Yates; Marquis Queen; Summers	Seven	3:57
5.	"Get Throw'd" (performed by 816 Boyz)	Watson; Aaron D. Yates; Melvin Calhoun Jr.; Queen; Jacob A. McDonough	JMAC Tracks	4:37
6.	"Strange" (featuring Tech N9ne)	Watson; A. Yates; Winfrey	Young Fyre; Nico Marchese (add.)	5:10
7.	"Proof of God"	Watson; Summers	Seven	4:01
Total length:				27:26

== Personnel ==
- Samuel "Krizz Kaliko" Watson — vocals
- Sean "Icy Roc Kravyn" Raspberry — additional vocals (track 1)
- Christopher Watson — additional vocals (tracks: 1, 5)
- Claudia "Snow Tha Product" Feliciano — additional vocals (track 2)
- Delynia Brown — additional vocals (tracks: 2, 4, 6)
- Crystal Watson — additional vocals (tracks: 2, 4, 6)
- Marcus "Oobergeek" Yates — additional vocals (track 4)
- Aaron D. "Tech N9ne" Yates — additional vocals (tracks: 5, 6)
- Melvin "Kutt Calhoun" Calhoun Jr. — additional vocals (track 5)
- Marquis "Makzilla" Queen — additional vocals (track 5)
- Robert Rebeck — guitars (track 2), mixing
- Michael "Seven" Summers — producer (tracks: 1, 3, 4, 7)
- Tramaine "Young Fyre" Winfrey — producer (tracks: 2, 6)
- Jake "JMAC" McDonough — producer (track 5)
- Nico Marchese — additional producer (track 6)
- Tom Baker — mastering
- Travis O'Guin — executive producer

== Charts ==
Chart (2012)	Peak position
US Top Current Album Sales (Billboard)	161
US Top R&B/Hip-Hop Albums (Billboard)	29
US Top Rap Albums (Billboard)	16
US Independent Albums (Billboard)	16
