= Wyshmaster =

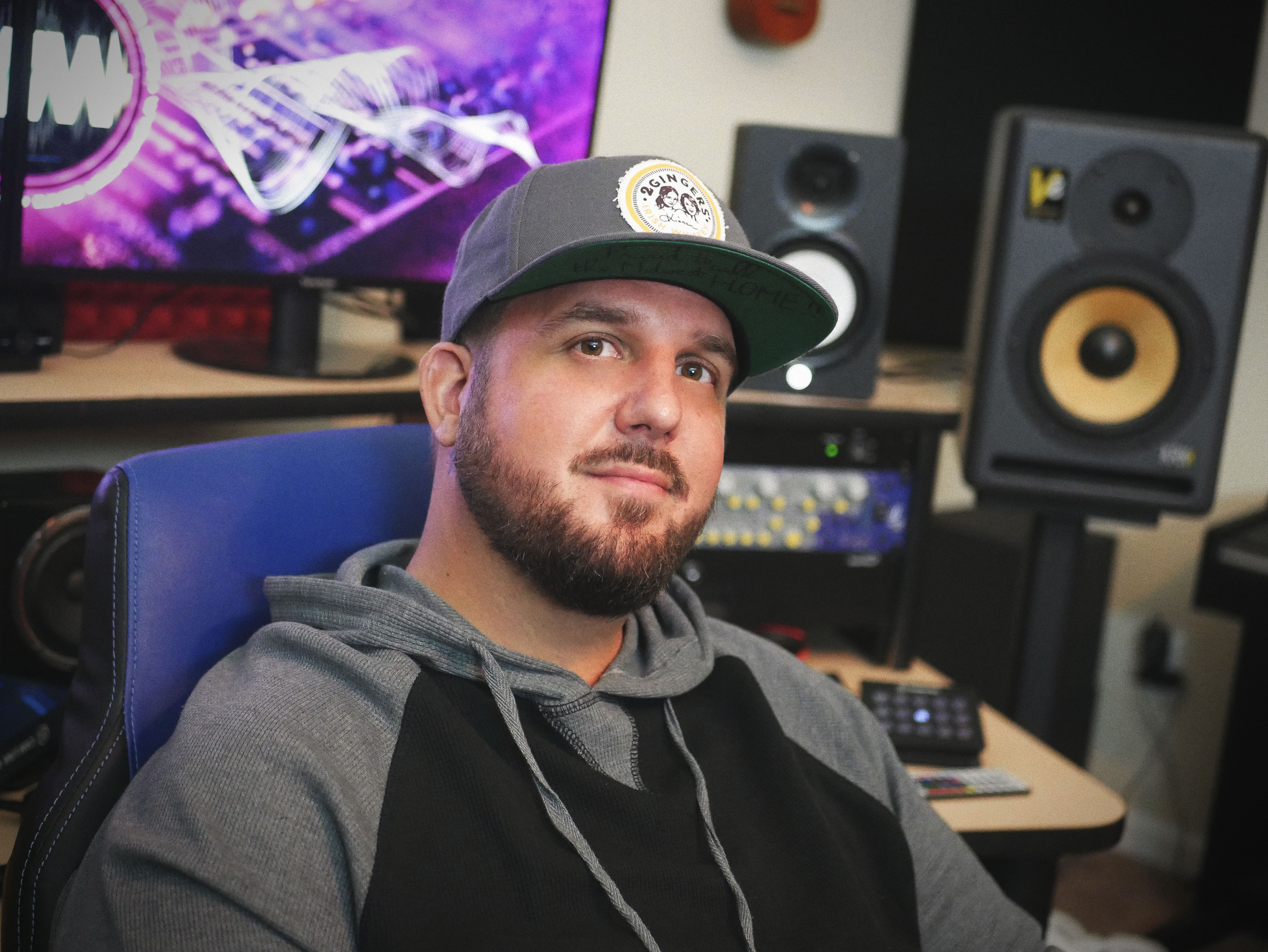

Background information
- Born: Adam Cherrington; April 20, 1979 (age 47); Chicago, Illinois, U.S.
- Genre: Hip-hop
- Occupation: Record producer

Adam Cherrington (born April 20, 1979), better known as "Wyshmaster", is an American record producer of hip-hop, contemporary R&B, and pop music. He has produced for games, commercials, television, movies, internet and radio; working with prominent names such as Nelly, T-Pain, Pitbull, Tech N9ne, St. Lunatics, Chingy, The Lonely Island, Field Mob, B.o.B and more. His work is multi-platinum selling and Grammy Award nominated. He was nominated for a Grammy Award in 2010 for the multi-platinum selling single, "I'm on a Boat" featuring Lonely Island and T-Pain.

== Career ==
Raised in the Chicago, Illinois, area, Wyshmaster started his career producing pop hip-hop tracks for Chicago's Midway Games video games such as NARC and NBA Ballers: Phenom. In St. Louis he worked with Nelly, St. Lunatics, Chingy, and other local artists. He produced Brass Knuckles by Nelly and "Superhero" by Chingy.

When SNL played "I'm on a Boat" it went viral, and Wyshmaster moved to Los Angeles. While in Los Angeles, he received a Grammy Award nomination, and worked with various American Idol finalists and songwriters, and was signed to Peermusic.

From 2011 until 2018, Wyshmaster teamed up with extreme Institute by Nelly and began dividing his time between producing and investing in the next generation of artists. He designed courses such as Beatology and served as a Campus Director in St. Louis, Missouri.

Late 2018, Wyshmaster relocated to Nashville, Tennessee constructing a novel breakthrough program solely surrounding music production. As one of the pioneers of leasing and selling music online, Wysh designed a program for students to learn the art of creating, leasing and selling their music, as well as how to network and earn a living as a music professional. Wyshmaster maintains his original focus for every artist online.

== Production discography ==
2004

- "NBA Ballers", Midway Games, "Scored 10 custom background music sequences"
- "Bolo", "I Ride", "Murder Dog Presents South Carolina", "Blood Rush Music"

2005

- "Smoke(6)", "Come See Me", "Ludacris Presents Disturbing Tha Peace", "Def Jam Recordings"
- "N.A.R.C.", Midway Games
- "L.A. Rush", Midway Games

2006

- "NBA Ballers Phenom" Midway Games
- "Twista featuring Kanjia, Pitbull and E40", "Talk Hard", The Core DJ's Compilation", "The Core DJ's"

2007

- "Chingy featuring Bobby Valentino", "Remember When", "Hate it or Love it", "Def Jam Recordings"

2008

- "Everybody Move", "Get the F... Outta Here", "The Waitress"', "Pillow Talkin", and "Enjoy", for Killer, 2008.
- "I See It", "Running Away", "J's On My Feet", "Colors", "Shotaz", "The Green Mile", and "Wipe That Sweat", for Feature Presentation, a Kutt Calhoun album, 2008.
- "U Ain't Him" and "Chill", for Brass Knuckles, 2008, a pop-rap crossover album from Nelly.

2009

- "Rain", from Jeremy Greene featuring Bossman. Originally posted on MySpace, when the site generated an unprecedented 27 million hits, MySpace Records offered Jeremy a recording contract and "Rain" is now an official single featuring Pitbull.
- "I'm on a Boat", from the Lonely Island album Incredibad, also seen as a digital short on Saturday Night Live. The song showed up on charts around the world and was the most popular YouTube video in February 2009. Later, it became an iPhone application.
- "Sickology 101" and "In the Air", for Tech N9ne Collabos: Sickology 101 (CD, Album) 2009, a collaboration album from Tech N9ne.

2010

- "Ack-A-Donkey", "In my Dreams", "Alive", "Tonight" for "Krizz Kaliko", "Shock Treatment", a "Strange Music" album 2010.
- "Eskimo", Ridin on 4's" for "Smoke Dogg", a "State II State" album 2010.

2011

- "Promiseland","So Lonely" and "Eenie Meanie Miny Ho" (Deluxe Edition) for All 6's and 7's, a Tech N9ne album, 2011.

2012

- "Everywhere We Go", "Edison Chen featuring MC Chef & MC Yan", "3 Corner", "East Asia Music".

2013

- "That Good Love", "Marissa Jack", K-Mart National Valentine's Day Commercial, 2013.
- "Stevie Stone featuring Brotha Lynch Hung", "Hush", "2 Birds 1 Stone", "Strange Music"

2019

- "Wided" - Lil Primo ft. yDEEPS, studio engineered by black808

2026

- "Self Titled" - Timmy No Brakes
