= Killer (Tech N9ne album) =

Studio album by Tech N9ne
- Released: July 1, 2008
- Recorded: January 15 – March 27, 2008
- Genres: Hip-hop; horrorcore; gangsta rap; rap metal
- Length: 2:07:03
- Label: Strange Music
- Producers: Aaron Abeyta; Aaron Bradley; Antonio "Elmo" Wesley; David Sanders II; Jonah "Matic Lee" Appleby; Krizz Kaliko; Makzilla; Robert Rebeck; Seven; Soleternity; Tech N9ne; UnderRated; Wyshmaster; Young Fyre

Tech N9ne chronology
Misery Loves Kompany (2007)	Killer (2008)	Sickology 101 (2009)

Professional ratings
Review scores
Source	Rating
AllMusic	4/5 stars
HipHopDX	3.5/5
IGN	8.6/10
RapReviews	8.5/10

Killer is the seventh studio album by American rapper Tech N9ne. It was released on July 1, 2008, via Strange Music. The album's cover pays homage to Michael Jackson's iconic 1982's Thriller.

Production was handled by Seven, Wyshmaster, David Sanders II, Robert Rebeck, Young Fyre, Jonah "Matic Lee" Appleby, Krizz Kaliko, Aaron Abeyta, Aaron Bradley, Antonio "Elmo" Wesley, Makzilla, Soleternity, UnderRated, and Tech N9ne himself, with Travis O'Guin serving as executive producer. It features guest appearances from Krizz Kaliko, Kutt Calhoun, Big Scoob, BG Bulletwound, Bosko, Brother J, (həd) ^{p.e.}, Ice Cube, Kottonmouth Kings, Lebowski, Liquid Assassin, Liz Suwandi, Mistah F.A.B., Paul Wall, Robert Rebeck, Scarface, Shawnna, Skatterman & Snug Brim, The Popper, The Weapon, and Strange Lane Choir.

The album debuted at number 12 on the Billboard 200, number 8 on the Top R&B/Hip-Hop Albums, number 6 on the Top Rap Albums and atop the Independent Albums charts with 36,200 copies sold in its first week in the United States.

== Background ==
This album was the first album Tech N9ne recorded as a double disc release, containing 32 tracks. (Everready (The Religion) contained two discs, however the second disc was marketed as a bonus disc and not a part of the album itself.) Guests who were featured on the album include Paul Wall, Scarface, Shawnna, Brother J of X-Clan, Mistah F.A.B., Kottonmouth Kings, Hed PE, Krizz Kaliko, Kutt Calhoun, Skatterman & Snug Brim, BG Bulletwound, Liquid Assassin of Grave Plott, and Ice Cube. While Brotha Lynch Hung was confirmed to be a guest on the album early on, he would be absent from the album in the end. It was later revealed that Brotha Lynch Hung was supposed to be on Psycho Bitch II, but he would have been unable to get his verse back to Tech in time, thus he did not appear. He was instead replaced by Grave Plott's Liquid Assassin.

On October 3, 2008, the music video for "Like Yeah" premiered on MTVU. The video was directed by Estevan Oriol and featured several cameos such as the songs producer Young Fyre, fellow label mates Krizz Kaliko and Kutt Calhoun, actor Danny Trejo, as well as artists Boo-Yaa T.R.I.B.E., C-Bo, Glasses Malone, Krondon, and Skinhead Rob.

== Track listing ==
=== Disc one ===
No.	Title	Writer(s)	Producer(s)	Length
1.	"Dr. Frazier's Office" (Intro Skit)	Aaron D. Yates	Robert Rebeck	1:20
2.	"Like Yeah"	Yates; Samuel Watson	Young Fyre	4:18
3.	"Wheaties" (featuring Shawnna)	Yates; Rashawnna Guy	Young Fyre	4:08
4.	"Everybody Move"	Yates; Watson	Wyshmaster	3:37
5.	"Get the Fuck Outta Here" (featuring The Popper and Paul Wall)	Yates; Paul Slayton; Walter Edwin; Manzilla Queen	Wyshmaster	4:27
6.	"The Waitress"	Yates	Wyshmaster	4:09
7.	"Crybaby"	Yates	Seven	4:36
8.	"Shit Is Real"	Yates; Watson; Jovan Canty	Jonah "Matic Lee" Appleby	3:43
9.	"Blackboy" (featuring Brother J, Ice Cube and Krizz Kaliko)	Yates; O'Shea Jackson; Jason Richard Hunter; Watson	Seven; Krizz Kaliko	4:45
10.	"Pillow Talkin'" (featuring Scarface)	Yates; Watson; Brad Jordan	Wyshmaster	3:42

Begin: The Dark Side

No.	Title	Writer(s)	Producer(s)	Length
11.	"Paint a Dark Picture" (featuring The Dirtball)	Yates; David Alexander	Seven	4:39
12.	"Hope for a Higher Power"	Yates	Seven	5:56
13.	"Worst Case Scenario (Skit)"	Yates; Brian Fraser	Seven; Robert Rebeck; Krizz Kaliko	1:50
14.	"Psycho Bitch II" (featuring Liquid Assassin)	Yates; Cardell Toombs; Robert Rebeck	Robert Rebeck	5:48
15.	"Poisonous" (featuring Liz Suwandi)	Yates; Liz Suwandi	Seven	2:42
16.	"Too Much" (featuring Kutt Calhoun)	Yates; Watson; Melvin Calhoun	Aaron Bradley	3:02

End: The Dark Side

Total length:
62:52

=== Disc two ===
No.	Title	Writer(s)	Producer(s)	Length
1.	"I Love You But Fuck You"	Yates; Queen	David Sanders II	5:22
2.	"One Good Time"	Yates	Jonah "Matic Lee" Appleby	4:28
3.	"Drill Team" (featuring Snug Brim, BG Bulletwound and Krizz Kaliko)	Yates; Watson; Gregory Roland; Aaron Henderson; Fraser	David Sanders II	5:16
4.	"Beat You Up" (featuring Lebowski, The Weapon and Big Scoob)	Yates; Devin Edwin; Preston Jones; Stewart D. Ashby Jr.	David Sanders II	5:12
5.	"Let's Go" (featuring Kutt Calhoun and Mistah F.A.B.)	Yates; Calhoun; Stanley P. Cox	David Sanders II	3:24
6.	"Why You Ain't Call Me"	Yates	Antonio "Elmo" Wesley	4:30

Begin: The Sextion

No.	Title	Writer(s)	Producer(s)	Length
7.	"Seven Words" (featuring Skatterman and Krizz Kaliko)	Yates; Stacy Landis; Watson	Seven	4:52
8.	"The Sexorcist (Infomercial)" (featuring Krizz Kaliko)	Yates; Watson	Seven	3:39
9.	"Killa Call" (Skit)	Yates	Tech N9ne	0:32
10.	"Enjoy" (featuring Krizz Kaliko and Bosko)	Yates; Watson; Bosco Kante	Wyshmaster	4:05
11.	"Elbow Macaroni" (Skit)	Yates	Tech N9ne; Makzilla	1:30
12.	"I Am Everything" (featuring (həd) ^{p.e.} and Kottonmouth Kings)	Yates; Paolo Gomes; Brad Xavier; Dustin Miller; Timothy McNutt	UnderRated; Aaron Abeyta; Jeff Simmons Jr. (add.)	3:35

End: The Sextion

No.	Title	Writer(s)	Producer(s)	Length
13.	"Happy Ending"	Yates	Seven	4:43
14.	"Can't Shake It" (featuring Krizz Kaliko and Robert Rebeck)	Yates; Watson	TyJilla	3:37
15.	"Holier Than Thou" (featuring Krizz Kaliko and Strange Lane Choir)	Yates; Watson	Young Fyre	5:22
16.	"Last Words"	Yates; Watson	Seven	4:14

Total length:
64:31

=== Bonus tracks ===
No.	Title	Producer(s)	Length
1.	"Get Your Attention" (featuring Gina McFadden & Krizz Kaliko) (Leftover track)	Young Fyre	3:49
2.	"Killer" (featuring Krizz Kaliko) (Strange Music online store pre-order bonus track)		3:26
3.	"Smoke Sumting" (featuring Krizz Kaliko) (Appeared on early sampler)		4:35

== Personnel ==
- Aaron D. "Tech N9ne" Yates — vocals, producer (tracks: 25, 27), A&R
- Stacie Frazier — additional vocals (tracks: 1, 32)
- Tiffany Casterline — additional vocals (track 1)
- Aaron "Snug Brim" Henderson — additional vocals (tracks: 1, 19)
- Donnell Woodward — additional vocals (track 1)
- Stacy "Skatterman" Landis — additional vocals (tracks: 1, 23)
- Melvin "Kutt Calhoun" Calhoun Jr. — additional vocals (tracks: 1, 2, 4, 16, 21, 31)
- Samuel "Krizz Kaliko" Watson — additional vocals (tracks: 1–4, 6, 8–12, 14, 16–24, 26, 28–32), producer (tracks: 9, 13)
- Gabe Roland — piano (track 1)
- Gina McFadden — additional vocals (tracks: 2, 10)
- Rashawnna "Shawnna" Guy — additional vocals (track 3)
- Paul "Paul Wall" Slayton — additional vocals (track 5)
- Walter "The Popper" Edwin — additional vocals (track 5)
- Alexandra Whirley — additional vocals (track 5)
- Crystal Watson — additional vocals (tracks: 6, 31)
- Brian "Scenario" Fraser — additional vocals (tracks: 7, 8, 19)
- Glenn "Brother Al" MacDonald — additional vocals (track 8)
- Robert Rebeck — additional vocals (tracks: 8, 11, 14, 30), producer (tracks: 1, 13, 14), mixing
- O'Shea "Ice Cube" Jackson — additional vocals (track 9)
- Jason "Brother J" Hunter — additional vocals (track 9)
- Brad "Scarface" Jordan — additional vocals (track 10)
- David "The Dirtball" Alexander — additional vocals (track 11)
- Jerita Streater — additional vocals (tracks: 12, 14, 23)
- Cardell "Liquid Assassin" Toombs — additional vocals (track 14)
- Shacarol Matthews — additional vocals (track 14)
- Liz Suwandi — additional vocals (track 15)
- Chandra Palmer — additional vocals (tracks: 16, 17)
- Gregory "B.G. Bulletwound" Roland — additional vocals (track 19)
- Devin "The Weapon" Edwin — additional vocals (track 20)
- Preston "Lebowski" Jones — additional vocals (track 20)
- Stewart D. "Big Scoob" Ashby Jr. — additional vocals (track 20)
- Stanley P. "Mistah F.A.B." Cox — additional vocals (track 21)
- Mackenzie Chesnut — additional vocals (track 23)
- Valerie Knight — additional vocals (tracks: 23, 24)
- Jace Wilbert — guitar (track 24)
- Coulter "Killa C" Hill — additional vocals (track 25)
- Bosko Kante — additional vocals (track 26)
- Beret Ziegenhorn — additional vocals (track 26)
- Glennae B. Harvey — additional vocals (tracks: 26, 31)
- Paolo "Jarred Shane" Gomes — additional vocals (track 28)
- Brad "Daddy X" Xavier — additional vocals (track 28)
- Dustin "D-Loc" Miller — additional vocals (track 28)
- Timothy "Johnny Richter" McNutt — additional vocals (track 28)
- Korey Lloyd — guitars (track 28)
- Jeff Simmons Jr. — additional guitars & additional producer (track 28)
- Vance Ashworth — additional vocals (track 31)
- Tramaine "Young Fyre" Winfrey — producer (tracks: 2, 3, 31)
- Adam "Wyshmaster" Cherrington — producer (tracks: 4–6, 10, 26)
- Michael "Seven" Summers — producer (tracks: 7, 9, 11–13, 15, 23, 24, 29, 32)
- Jonah "Matic Lee" Appleby — producer (tracks: 8, 18)
- Aaron Bradley — producer (track 16)
- David Sanders II — producer (tracks: 17, 19–21)
- Antonio "Elmo" Wesley — producer (track 22)
- Manzila "Makzilla" Queen — producer (track 27)
- Josh "UnderRated" Liederman — producer (track 28)
- Aaron Abeyta — producer (track 28)
- Ty "TyJilla" Reynolds — producer (track 30)
- Tom Baker — mastering
- Travis O'Guin — executive producer, A&R
- Ron Spaulding — associate producer
- Sean Branagan — art direction, design
- Joshua Hoffine — photography
- Robert Lieberman — legal

== Charts ==
Chart (2008)	Peak position
US Billboard 200	12
US Top R&B/Hip-Hop Albums (Billboard)	8
US Top Rap Albums (Billboard)	6
US Independent Albums (Billboard)	1
