= Feature Presentation =

Studio album by Kutt Calhoun
- Released: October 7, 2008
- Recorded: 2006–2008
- Genre: Hip hop
- Length: 77:50
- Label: Strange Music
- Producer: Matic Lee; Seven; Wyshmaster; Young Fyre

Kutt Calhoun chronology
B.L.E.V.E. (2004)	Feature Presentation (2008)	Raw and Un-Kutt (2010)

Singles from Feature Presentation
- 1. "Bunk Rock Bitch" Released: January 15, 2009

Professional ratings
Review scores
Source	Rating
RapReviews	(8/10)

Feature Presentation is the second studio album by Kansas City rapper Kutt Calhoun. It was released on October 7, 2008, and was able to chart #60 on Billboard's "Top R&B/Hip-Hop Albums" chart in its first week of release.

It contains 19 tracks, with collaborations with fellow Strange Music label mates like Tech N9ne, the group Skatterman & Snug Brim, and Krizz Kaliko. It also includes other artists such as BG-Bulletwound, The Popper, Greed, Joe Vertigo, Riv Locc, DJ Chill, Vance Leroy, Bishop, and singer Jerita Streater. The album has production from Michael "Seven" Summers, Wyshmaster, Matic Lee and Young Fyre. Rap Reviews gave the album a positive review and a score of 8/10.

A music video was shot for the song "Bunk Rock Bitch," and the video was released by the record label through their YouTube account on January 15, 2009. The video features fellow label mates Tech N9ne and Krizz Kaliko.

== Track list ==
No.	Title	Writer(s)	Producer(s)	Length
1.	"Feature Presentation (Intro)"	M. Calhoun	Young Fyre	03:00
2.	"Bunk Rock Bitch"	M. Calhoun, S. Watson	Young Fyre	04:46
3.	"Speed" (featuring Jerita Streater)	M. Calhoun, G. Rice	Seven	03:26
4.	"I See It" (featuring Tech N9ne)	M. Calhoun	Wyshmaster	03:16
5.	"Killa City" (featuring E-Skool, Jerita Streater, Paul Mussan, The Popper)	E. Calbert, M. Calhoun, P. Sowell, E. Walter	Young Fyre	04:30
6.	"Stop Jeffin'" (featuring BG Bulletwound, Krizz Kaliko, Tech N9ne)	M. Calhoun, G. Roland, S. Watson, A. Yates	Young Fyre	04:04
7.	"Good Friend" (featuring Krizz Kaliko)	M. Calhoun, S. Watson	Young Fyre	04:32
8.	"Running Away (The Breakup)" (featuring Bishop, Skatterman)	M. Calhoun, E. Dixon, S. Landis	Wyshmaster	04:04
9.	"The Best Man" (featuring Vance Laroy)	M. Calhoun, M. Queen	Seven	04:10
10.	"J's on My Feet"	M. Calhoun	Wyshmaster	04:23
11.	"Colors" (featuring Joe Vertigo, Riv Locc)	M. Calhoun, M. Tyler, J. Watson	Wyshmaster	04:31
12.	"School Daze" (featuring Krizz Kaliko, Tech N9ne)	M. Calhoun, A. Yates	Young Fyre	05:13
13.	"Shotaz" (featuring Snug Brim)	M. Calhoun, A. Henderson	Wyshmaster	04:28
14.	"The Green Mile"	M. Calhoun, S. Watson	Wyshmaster	04:49
15.	"Letter to My Kids" (featuring Krizz Kaliko)	M. Calhoun, S. Watson	Matic Lee	04:33
16.	"Mr. Freaky (Skit)"	M. Calhoun	Robert Rebeck	01:56
17.	"Wipe That Sweat" (featuring DJ Chill, Krizz Kaliko)	M. Calhoun, S. Mitchell, S. Watson	Wyshmaster	03:33
18.	"Whoop D Whoop" (featuring Greed)	M. Calhoun, W. LeJeune, M. Queen	Seven	03:49
19.	"Smilin' Faces" (featuring Krizz Kaliko)	M. Calhoun, S. Watson	Matic Lee	04:47
Total length:				77:50

== See also ==
- Kutt Calhoun discography
