= Kuttin Loose =

EP by Kutt Calhoun
- Released: July 10, 2015
- Genre: Hip hop
- Label: Black Gold Entertainment

Kutt Calhoun chronology
Black Gold (2013)	Kuttin Loose (2015)	Truth Be Told (2019)

Professional ratings
Review scores
Source	Rating
HipHopDX	3.5/5 stars

Kuttin Loose is the third EP released by Kutt Calhoun, an American rapper. It was released on July 10, 2015 through Calhoun's imprint Black Gold Entertainment. The EP peaked at No.16 on the Heatseekers Albums chart, and No. 41 on the Top Rap Albums chart. HipHopDX gave Kuttin Loose a score of 3.5/5 and a positive review. MetroActive wrote, "On his latest effort, the Kuttin Loose EP, he demonstrates a devastating flow, razor sharp wit and some downright nasty Dirty South production." A single from the album, "Handz Up (Shut Shit Down)" addressed police brutality, with Kutt directing the music video himself.

== Track listing ==
No.	Title	Length
1.	"Guillotine" (Featuring Tali Blanco)
2.	"Shooting Gallery"
3.	"Handz up (Shut Shit Down)"
4.	"Fuck With You the Long Way" (Featuring Ava Mercedes)
5.	"On Fleek" (Featuring De Are, Infinity)
6.	"State Ov Emerge N See"
7.	"Regal" (Featuring Flawless Real Talk, Sky Jones)
8.	"On My Own (I Got You)" (Featuring Demond Jones)

== Charts ==
Chart (2014)	Peak position
US Top Heatseekers (Billboard)	16
US Top R&B/Hip-Hop Albums (Billboard)	41

== Personnel ==
- Kutt Calhoun - primary artist
