= Black Gold (Kutt Calhoun album) =

Studio album by Kutt Calhoun
- Released: February 26, 2013
- Recorded: 2011–2012
- Genre: Hip hop
- Length: 59:28
- Label: Strange Music
- Producers: Seven; Monsta Muzik

Kutt Calhoun chronology
| Raw and Un-Kutt (2010) | Black Gold (2013) | Kuttin Loose (2015) |

Singles from Black Gold
- 1. "Self Preservation" Released: February 1, 2013; 2. "I Been Dope" Released: 2013

Black Gold is the fourth studio album by American rapper Kutt Calhoun. It was released on February 26, 2013, through Strange Music, making it his final full-length for the label. Production was handled by Seven and Monsta Muzik. It features guest appearances from Ben-G Da Prince of Soul, BG Bulletwound, Bishop Don Dotta, Brotha Lynch Hung, Krizz Kaliko, Nesto The Owner, Ron Ron, Snug Brim, Tech N9ne and The Popper.

The album debuted at number 120 on the Billboard 200, number 25 on the Top R&B/Hip-Hop Albums, number 13 on the Top Rap Albums, number 22 on the Independent Albums and topped the Heatseekers Albums charts, with first-week sales of 4,300 copies in the United States.

== Critical response ==
Professional ratings
Review scores
| Source | Rating |
|---|---|
| AllMusic | 3.5/5 stars |
| HipHopDX | 3.5/5 |

AllMusic's David Jeffries gave the album three and a half stars out of five, saying "crafting a thug party anthem out of a Willy Wonka line ("I Don't Like the Look of It") and using the '70s sitcom Three's Company as inspiration for a strip club jam ("Jack Tripper") rapper Kutt Calhoun is still the Strange Music label's strongest link to the streets, but here, he's certainly upped the funny. Maybe it's hanging around label boss Tech N9ne, who guest stars on the great "I Been Dope" ("I been dope since Reaganomics/Son of a crack fiend, holla at me"), but most of the exciting moments on Black Gold are when Kutt goes weird and/or wild, or maybe even novelty". Edwin Ortiz of HipHopDX also gave the album three and a half out of five, saying "Black Gold revels in its ability to highlight the unique approach of Strange Music while still sounding refreshingly conventional. At 35 years young, Kutt Calhoun is picking up traction when other rappers would be given the checkered flag. Underappreciated or not, that's something that won't go unnoticed".

== Track listing ==
| No. | Title | Writer(s) | Producer(s) | Length |
|---|---|---|---|---|
| 1. | "Self Preservation" (featuring Krizz Kaliko) | Melvin Calhoun Jr.; Samuel Watson; Michael Summers | Seven | 3:51 |
| 2. | "501s and Rightsides" (featuring Brotha Lynch Hung) | Calhoun Jr.; Kevin Mann; Summers | Seven | 3:36 |
| 3. | "I Been Dope" (featuring Tech N9NE) | Calhoun Jr.; Aaron D. Yates; Summers | Seven | 4:33 |
| 4. | "I Don't Like the Look of It" | Calhoun Jr.; Summers | Seven | 3:18 |
| 5. | "See What Had Happened Was" | Calhoun Jr.; Summers | Seven | 4:00 |
| 6. | "Same Thing" | Calhoun Jr.; Summers | Seven | 4:18 |
| 7. | "Jack Tripper" | Calhoun Jr.; Summers | Seven | 3:25 |
| 8. | "Anthem" | Calhoun Jr.; Summers | Seven | 3:49 |
| 9. | "It's Goin' Down" (featuring BG Bulletwound and Snug Brim) | Calhoun Jr.; Gregory Roland; Aaron Henderson; Tylan M. Briscoe | Monsta Muzik | 4:59 |
| 10. | "Baby Mama Drama" (featuring Bishop Don Dotta) | Calhoun Jr.; Ernest Dixon; Summers | Seven | 4:36 |
| 11. | "That's My Word" | Calhoun Jr.; Summers | Seven | 4:15 |
| 12. | "Hello and Goodbye" | Calhoun Jr.; Summers | Seven | 4:48 |
| 13. | "In They Honor" (featuring Ben-G da Prince of Soul) | Calhoun Jr.; Benjamin E. Givens IV; Summers | Seven | 5:00 |
| 14. | "I Been Dope: The Town Remix" (featuring The Popper, Ron Ron and Nesto The Owner) | Calhoun Jr.; Walter Edwin; Ronald Frank White; Ernesto Edwards; Summers | Seven | 5:00 |
| Total length: | | | | 59:28 |

Strange Music website pre-order bonus download track
| No. | Title | Length |
|---|---|---|
| 15. | "Heart 2 Heart" (featuring Krizz Kaliko) | 4:21 |

== Personnel ==
- Melvin "Kutt Calhoun" Calhoun Jr. – vocals
- Samuel "Krizz Kaliko" Watson – additional vocals (tracks: 1, 4, 5, 7)
- Kevin "Brotha Lynch Hung" Mann – additional vocals (track 2)
- Aaron D. "Tech N9NE" Yates – additional vocals (tracks: 3, 5)
- Gregory "B.G. Bulletwound" Roland – additional vocals (tracks: 5, 9)
- Manzila "Makzilla" Queen – additional vocals (track 5)
- Benjamin E. "Ben-G da Prince of Soul" Givens IV – additional vocals (tracks: 6, 13)
- Aaron "Snug Brim" Henderson – additional vocals (track 9)
- Ernest "Bishop Young Don" Dixon – additional vocals (track 10)
- Walter "The Popper" Edwin – additional vocals (track 14)
- Ronald "Ron Ron" White – additional vocals (track 14)
- Ernesto "Nesto The Owner" Edwards – additional vocals (track 14)
- Michael "Seven" Summers – producer (tracks: 1–8, 10–14)
- Tylan M. "Monsta Muzik" Briscoe – producer (track 9)
- Ben Cybulsky – mixing
- Tom Baker – mastering
- Travis O'Guin – executive producer, A&R
- Dave Weiner – A&R
- James Meierotto – photography

== Charts ==
| Chart (2013) | Peak position |
|---|---|
| US Billboard 200 | 120 |
| US Top R&B/Hip-Hop Albums (Billboard) | 25 |
| US Top Rap Albums (Billboard) | 13 |
| US Independent Albums (Billboard) | 22 |
| US Heatseekers Albums (Billboard) | 1 |
