= Klusterfuk =

EP by Tech N9ne
- Released: March 13, 2012
- Recorded: 2011–12
- Genre: Hip-hop
- Length: 23:27
- Label: Strange Music
- Producer: ¡Mayday!

Tech N9ne chronology
Welcome to Strangeland (2011)	Klusterfuk (2012)	E.B.A.H. (2012)

Professional ratings
Review scores
Source	Rating
Allmusic	3/5 stars
HipHopDX	4/5 stars
RapReviews	(7.5/10)

Klusterfuk is the third EP by rapper Tech N9ne. It was released on March 13, 2012.

== Background ==
Klusterfuk was first announced in early 2011. Then, in August 2011, Tech N9ne confirmed that he was about to begin work on Klusterfuk and his upcoming thirteenth studio album Welcome to Strangeland. In the post, he also confirmed that production for the EP would be handled entirely by ¡Mayday!. Tech has also expressed an interest in collaboration with alternative/blues musician Citizen Cope for the EP. Although it was later confirmed that Citizen Cope has agreed to work with Tech on the EP, the track didn't appear on Klusterfuk.

In October, 2011, Tech expressed an interest to collaborate with hip-hop duo Aqualeo for the EP. It was later confirmed that the two are collaborating on a track for the EP. In December 2011, Tech announced that he was in the process of selecting the last 2 beats. On January 28, Tech N9ne announced that Klusterfuk was done, and it was sent to be mixed. The EP was released on March 13, 2012. It debuted at number 15 on the Billboard 200 with approximately 17,000 copies sold in its first week of release. It debuted at number 79 on the Canadian Albums Chart. As of March 25, 2012, Klusterfuk has sold 20,000 copies in the United States.

== Track listing ==
No.	Title	Writer(s)	Producer(s)	Length
1.	"Klusterfuk" (featuring Sassy)	Aaron Yates, Shannon Gross, Aaron Eckhart, Benjamin Miller	Plex Luthor, Wrekonize (co.)	4:15
2.	"Blur" (featuring Wrekonize)	Yates, Miller, Bernardo Garcia, Manzilla Marquis Queen	Wrekonize	4:40
3.	"Can't Stand Me" (featuring Krizz Kaliko)	Yates, Samuel Watson, Eckhart	Plex Luthor	2:44
4.	"Ugly Duckling" (featuring Aqualeo)	Yates, Acie L. High, Eric Mitchell, Eckhart	Plex Luthor	4:36
5.	"Awkward"	Yates, Gianni Perocarpi	Gianni Cash	3:29
6.	"D.K.N.Y." (featuring Krizz Kaliko)	Yates, Watson, Perocarpi	Gianni Cash	3:43
