= GO (Krizz Kaliko album) =

G.O.

Studio album by Krizz Kaliko
- Released: April 8, 2016
- Recorded: 2015–2016
- Studio: Strangeland Studios
- Genre: Alternative hip hop; R&B; soul; jazz
- Length: 56:00
- Label: Strange Music
- Producer: Seven; Krizz Kaliko; Young Fyre; Ben Cybulsky

Krizz Kaliko chronology
Son of Sam (2013)	G.O. (2016)	Legend (2020)

Singles from Go
- 1. "Stop The World" Released: March 3, 2016; 2. "Behave" Released: March 10, 2016; 3. "Talk Up On It" Released: March 31, 2016

Professional ratings
Review scores
Source	Rating
AllMusic	4/5 stars
HipHopDX	3.8/5

G.O. (God's Order) is the sixth studio album by American rapper Krizz Kaliko. It was released on April 8, 2016, through Strange Music, and would serve as his last release with Strange. Recording sessions took place at Strangeland Studios. Production was handled by Seven, Young Fyre, Ben Cybulsky and Krizz Kaliko himself, with Travis O'Guin serving as executive producer. It features guest appearances from Tech N9ne, Ces Cru, JL B. Hood, Rittz, Stevie Stone and Wrekonize. The album debuted at number 89 on the Billboard 200, number 4 on both the Top R&B/Hip-Hop Albums and the Top Rap Albums and number 6 on the Independent Albums charts in the United States.

== Track listing ==
No.	Title	Writer(s)	Producer(s)	Length
1.	"Mama's Intro/God's Order" (Skit)	Barbara J. Word	Ben Cybulsky; Krizz Kaliko	1:02
2.	"Talk Up on It"	Samuel Watson; Michael Summers	Seven; Krizz Kaliko	2:58
3.	"Bite Your Tongue"	Watson; Summers	Seven	3:32
4.	"Didn't Wanna Wake You"	Watson; Tramaine Winfrey	Young Fyre	4:01
5.	"Outta Line"	Watson; Summers	Seven; Krizz Kaliko	3:28
6.	"Behave" (featuring Tech N9ne)	Watson; Aaron D. Yates; Summers	Seven	4:04
7.	"More" (featuring Stevie Stone)	Watson; Stephen Williams; Summers	Seven	3:20
8.	"No No's"	Watson; Summers	Seven; Krizz Kaliko	3:35
9.	"Orangutan" (featuring Tech N9ne, Rittz, Ces Cru, JL B.Hood and Wrekonize)	Watson; Yates; Jonathan McCollum; Donnie King; Mike Viglione; Jason M. Varnes; Benjamin Miller; Summers	Seven	4:50
10.	"Wallflower" (featuring Tech N9ne)	Watson; Yates; Manzilla Marquis Queen; Summers	Seven	3:52
11.	"Big FU"	Watson; Summers	Seven	4:10
12.	"Logged Off"	Watson; Summers	Seven	3:58
13.	"No Love" (Interlude)			0:14
14.	"No Love" (featuring Tech N9ne)	Watson; Yates; Summers	Seven	4:57
15.	"Stop the World"	Watson; Queen; Summers	Seven	4:40
16.	"Happyish"	Watson; Summers	Seven	3:19
Total length:				56:00

Bonus pre-order download track
No.	Title	Writer(s)	Length
17.	"You See It (Buss It)"	Watson	3:48

== Personnel ==
- Samuel "Krizz Kaliko" Watson — vocals, producer (tracks: 1, 2, 5, 8), A&R
- Aaron "Tech N9NE" Yates — vocals (tracks: 6, 9, 10, 14), additional vocals (tracks: 3, 11, 15)
- Stephen "Stevie Stone" Williams — vocals (track 7), additional vocals (track 8)
- Jonathan "Rittz" McCollum — vocals (track 9)
- Donnie "Godemis" King — vocals (track 9)
- Mike "Ubiquitous" Viglione — vocals (track 9)
- Jason "JL" Varnes — vocals (track 9)
- Benjamin "Wrekonize" Miller — vocals (track 9)
- Barbara J. Word — additional vocals (tracks: 1, 12)
- Crystal Watson — additional vocals (tracks: 2–5, 9, 11, 12, 14–16)
- Delynia Brown — additional vocals (tracks: 2–4, 9, 11, 12, 14–16)
- Gina McFadden — additional vocals (tracks: 2, 4, 5)
- Sean Tyler — additional vocals (tracks: 11, 15)
- Honnȇtebas — additional vocals (track 13)
- Brett Jackson — baritone saxophone (tracks: 1, 5, 9, 11)
- Steven Lambert — tenor saxophone (tracks: 1, 5, 11), brass (tracks: 1, 9)
- Chris White — trombone (tracks: 1, 5, 9, 11)
- Ryan Thielman — trumpet (tracks: 1, 5, 9, 11)
- Korey Lloyd — guitar (tracks: 2, 3)
- Lucas Parker — guitar (tracks: 3, 6, 10, 14, 16), bass guitar (tracks: 3, 10, 14)
- Michael "Seven" Summers — guitar (tracks: 5, 11), producer (tracks: 2, 3, 5–12, 14–16)
- Jason Betts — bass guitar (track 12)
- Tyler Lyon — guitar (track 15)
- Ben Cybulsky — producer (track 1), recording & mixing
- Tramaine "Young Fyre" Winfrey — producer (track 4)
- Dave Weiner — associate producer, A&R
- Travis O'Guin — executive producer, A&R
- Tom Baker — mastering
- Samantha Levi — photography

== Charts ==
Chart (2016)	Peak position
US Billboard 200	89
US Top R&B/Hip-Hop Albums (Billboard)	4
US Top Rap Albums (Billboard)	4
US Independent Albums (Billboard)	6
