= B.L.E.V.E. =

Studio album by Kutt Calhoun
- Released: August 10, 2004
- Recorded: 2003–2004
- Genre: Hip hop
- Length: 68:16
- Label: Strange Music
- Producer: Various

Kutt Calhoun chronology
B.L.E.V.E. (2004)	Feature Presentation (2008)

B.L.E.V.E. is the debut studio album by Kansas City rapper Kutt Calhoun, released on August 10, 2004 through the label Strange Music. Among the featured artists beyond Calhoun were Krizz Kaliko, Tech N9ne, and Skatterman & Snug Brim. Rap Reviews greeted the album positively, giving it a score of 7/10 and writing "Calhoun has represented his hometown [Kansas City] admirably on B.L.E.V.E. and seems on the verge of blowing up bigtime. All he needs is more exposure, a slightly tighter selection of beats, and one big video on a Viacom owned network."

== Track listing ==
No.	Title	Writer(s)	Length
1.	"Bring the Flame"	M. Calhoun	4:32
2.	"Hip Hop Warning" (featuring Krizz Kaliko)	M. Calhoun	3:20
3.	"Nationality (Parlaa Remix)" (featuring Krizz Kaliko)	M. Calhoun, S. Watson	4:21
4.	"Keep It Keeblur" (featuring Tech N9ne, Krizz Kaliko)	M. Calhoun, A. Yates	4:26
5.	"Walk with a Limp" (featuring Krizz Kaliko)	M. Calhoun	3:35
6.	"Goldberg" (featuring Tech N9ne)	M. Calhoun, A. Yates	4:12
7.	"Got Plans" (featuring Krizz Kaliko)	M. Calhoun	3:36
8.	"Real Sex" (featuring Tech N9ne)	M. Calhoun, A. Yates	4:53
9.	"In My Face" (featuring BG Bulletwound, Skatterman & Snug Brim)	M. Calhoun, A. Henderson, S. Landis, G. Roland	5:23
10.	"Panic Box" (featuring Boy Big)	M. Calhoun	3:44
11.	"The Know How" (featuring Krizz Kaliko)	M. Calhoun	3:28
12.	"N a Whitemanzeyez" (featuring Tech N9ne, Krizz Kaliko)	M. Calhoun	5:08
13.	"My Life" (featuring Krizz Kaliko)	M. Calhoun, S. Watson, A. Yates	3:57
14.	"To Whom It May Concern" (featuring BG Bulletwound, Skatterman & Snug Brim)	M. Calhoun, A. Henderson, S. Landis, G. Roland	4:41
15.	"Parlaa" (featuring Krizz Kaliko)	M. Calhoun, S. Watson	4:14
16.	"Dat Nigga Dare" (featuring Krizz Kaliko)	M. Calhoun	4:46
Total length:			68:16
