= S.I.C. (Krizz Kaliko EP) =

EP by Krizz Kaliko
- Released: May 17, 2011
- Recorded: 2011
- Genre: Alternative hip hop, R&B
- Label: Strange Music

Krizz Kaliko chronology
Shock Treatment (2010)	S.I.C. (2011)	Kickin' And Screamin' (2012)

S.I.C. is the first EP by rapper Krizz Kaliko. It was released on May 17, 2011. The album was revealed to be an acronym for Samuel’s Identity Crisis.

== Guest artists ==
The only guest on the album is Tech N9ne.

== Commercial performance ==
The album debuted at number 41 on the US Top Independent chart.

== Track listing ==
No.	Title	Length
1.	"Dr. Suwandi (skit)"	0:49
2.	"Immortal"	3:32
3.	"Rain Dance"	3:04
4.	"Animal"	2:47
5.	"Medicine" (featuring Tech N9ne)	2:42
6.	"Down" (featuring Tech N9ne)	3:04
