= Raw and Un-Kutt =

Studio album by Kutt Calhoun
- Released: June 8, 2010
- Recorded: 2009–2010
- Genre: Hip hop
- Length: 1:14:20
- Label: Strange Music
- Producer: Travis O'Guin (exec.); DJ Frequency; Evsclusive; Jonah "Matic Lee" Appleby; Justinn "Axis" Patton; Robert Rebeck; Seven; Young Fyre

Kutt Calhoun chronology
Feature Presentation (2008)	Raw and Un-Kutt (2010)	Black Gold (2013)

Singles from Raw and Un-Kutt
- 1. "Get Kutt" Released: May 18, 2010

Professional ratings
Review scores
Source	Rating
AllMusic	3.5/5 stars
RapReviews	6/10

Raw and Un-Kutt is the third solo studio album by American rapper Kutt Calhoun. It was released on June 8, 2010 via Strange Music. Production was handled by Seven, DJ Frequency, Young Fyre, Justinn "Axis" Patton, Robert Rebeck, Evsclusive and Jonah "Matic Lee" Appleby, with Q-Rock and Ronald Richardson Jr. serving as additional producers. It features guest appearances from 816 Boyz, Barbara Ward, BG Bulletwound, Bishop Young Don, Brotha Lynch Hung, Craig Smith, D-Skanless, E-40, Irv Da Phenom, Jerita Streater, Joe Budden, Krizz Kaliko, Nesto The Owner, Riv Locc, Stevie Stone, Tech N9ne and Too Short.

The album debuted at number 170 on the Billboard 200, number 27 on the Top R&B/Hip-Hop Albums, number 15 on the Top Rap Albums, number 28 on the Independent Albums and number 6 on the Heatseekers Albums charts in the United States.

The album was supported with a single "Get Kutt", released on May 18, 2010, and a music video for the song "Naked (Boom Boom Room)", released on May 28, 2010.

== Track listing ==
No.	Title	Writer(s)	Producer(s)	Length
1.	"The Deal" (Intro)	Melvin Calhoun Jr.	Robert Rebeck	2:28
2.	"That's Kutt Calhoun" (featuring Jerita Streater)	Calhoun Jr.; Aaron D. Yates	Jonah "Matic Lee" Appleby	3:25
3.	"Get Kutt"	Calhoun Jr.; Yates	Seven	4:55
4.	"Naked (Boom Boom Room)" (featuring Tech N9NE)	Calhoun Jr.; Yates; Samuel Watson	Young Fyre; Ronald Richardson Jr. (add.)	3:34
5.	"Only Knew" (featuring D-Skanless and Bishop Young Don)	Calhoun Jr.; Ronalda Askew; Ernest Dixon	DJ Frequency	3:48
6.	"Buy the Bar" (featuring Nesto The Owner)	Calhoun Jr.; Ernesto Edwards	Seven	4:40
7.	"Flip Cam" (performed by 816 Boyz)	Calhoun Jr.; Watson; Manzilla Queen; Yates	Seven	5:25
8.	"Kansas City Shuffle"	Calhoun Jr.	DJ Frequency	2:41
9.	"Hey Hey Hey (Raw and Un-Kutt)"	Calhoun Jr.; Joell Ortiz	DJ Frequency	4:21
10.	"Calm Down" (featuring Stevie Stone and Riv Locc)	Calhoun Jr.; Steve Williams; Marco Tyler	Seven	4:35
11.	"Flip It Ova"	Calhoun Jr.	Evsclusive	4:15
12.	"She Wants Me" (featuring Too $hort and Irv Da Phenom)	Calhoun Jr.; Todd Shaw; Mitchell Irving Jr.; Ortiz	DJ Frequency	3:40
13.	"Laughing Stock" (featuring Craig Smith)	Calhoun Jr.; Craig Smith; Yates	Young Fyre; Quinton "Q-Rock" Johnson (add.)	3:58
14.	"You Don't Wanna Funk" (featuring E-40 and BG Bulletwound)	Calhoun Jr.; Earl Stevens; Gregory Roland	Seven	4:08
15.	"Redemption" (featuring Joe Budden)	Calhoun Jr.; Joseph Budden; Yates	Young Fyre	4:54
16.	"Dark Knights" (featuring Brotha Lynch Hung)	Calhoun Jr.; Kevin Mann	Justinn "Axis" Patton	4:17
17.	"Something's Gotta Give" (featuring Tech N9NE)	Calhoun Jr.; Yates	Seven	3:20
18.	"Calling My Name" (featuring Barbara Ward)	Calhoun Jr.; Watson	Justinn "Axis" Patton	5:56
Total length:				1:14:20

Strange Music pre-order digital bonus track
No.	Title	Length
19.	"Same O.G." (featuring BG Bulletwound)

== Personnel ==
- Melvin "Kutt Calhoun" Calhoun, Jr. – vocals
- Jerita Streater – additional vocals (track 2)
- Samuel "Krizz Kaliko" Watson – additional vocals (tracks: 2, 4, 7–9, 18)
- Aaron D. "Tech N9NE" Yates – additional vocals (tracks: 3, 4, 7, 17), A&R
- Manzila "Makzilla" Queen – additional vocals (tracks: 4, 7)
- Ronalda "D-Skanless" Askew – additional vocals (track 5)
- Ernest "Bishop Young Don" Dixon – additional vocals (tracks: 5, 9)
- Sean Tyler – additional vocals (track 5)
- Angie Taylor – additional vocals (tracks: 5, 9, 16)
- Ernesto "Nesto The Owner" Edwards – additional vocals (track 6)
- Brian "Scenario" Fraser – additional vocals (tracks: 7, 8, 18)
- Aaron Bean – additional vocals (tracks: 7, 8), marketing
- Steve "Stevie Stone" Williams – additional vocals (track 10)
- Marco "Riv Locc" Tyler – additional vocals (track 10)
- Todd "Too $hort" Shaw – additional vocals (track 12)
- Mitchell "Irv Da Phenom" Irving, Jr. – additional vocals (track 12)
- Craig Smith – additional vocals (track 13)
- Earl "E-40" Stevens – additional vocals (track 14)
- Gregory "B.G. Bulletwound" Roland – additional vocals (track 14)
- Joe Budden – additional vocals (track 15)
- Tanya Herron – additional vocals (track 15)
- Kevin "Brotha Lynch Hung" Mann – additional vocals (track 16)
- Barbara Ward – additional vocals (track 18)
- Korey Lloyd – guitars (track 15), production assistant, project management, publicity coordinator
- Robert Rebeck – producer (track 1), skit producer (tracks: 4, 7–9), mixing
- Jonah "Matic Lee" Appleby – producer (track 2)
- Michael "Seven" Summers – producer (tracks: 3, 6, 7, 10, 14, 17)
- Tramaine "Young Fyre" Winfey – producer (tracks: 4, 13, 15)
- Bryan "Frequency" Fryzel – producer (tracks: 5, 8, 9, 12)
- Everritt "Evsclusive" Edwards – producer (track 11)
- Justinn "Axis" Patton – producer (tracks: 16, 18)
- Ronald Richardson, Jr. – additional producer (track 4)
- Quinton "Q-Rock" Johnson – additional producer (track 13)
- Tom Baker – mastering
- Travis O'Guin – executive producer, A&R
- Dave Weiner – associate producer
- Ron Spaulding – associate producer
- Ben Grossi – project consultant, general management
- Brian Shafton – project consultant, general management
- Glenda Cowan – production assistant
- Dawn O'Guin – production assistant
- Cory Nielsen – production assistant
- Richie Abbott – publicity
- Megan McLean – publicity
- Robert Lieberman – legal
- Nick Vedros – photography
- Liquid 9 – art direction, design
- Britton Kimler – marketing, promotions
- Chris Rooney – marketing, promotions
- Josh Rickards – marketing
- Brett Morrow – marketing

== Charts ==
Chart (2010)	Peak position
US Billboard 200	170
US Top R&B/Hip-Hop Albums (Billboard)	27
US Top Rap Albums (Billboard)	15
US Independent Albums (Billboard)	28
US Heatseekers Albums (Billboard)	6
