= Son of Sam (album) =

Studio album by Krizz Kaliko
- Released: August 27, 2013
- Recorded: 2012–2013
- Genre: Hip hop
- Length: 54:45
- Label: Strange Music
- Producers: J. White Did It, Matic Lee, Nico Marchese, Seven, Steven J. Collins, Young Fyre

Krizz Kaliko chronology
Kickin' and Screamin' (2012)	Son of Sam (2013)	GO (2016)

Son of Sam is the fifth studio album by American rapper Krizz Kaliko. The album was released on August 27, 2013, by Strange Music. The album features guest appearances from Tech N9ne, Ces Cru, Kortney Leveringston, IcyRoc Kravyn and his wife Crystal Watson.

== Background ==
In an August 2013 interview with HipHopDX, Krizz Kaliko explained where the album title Son of Sam came from, saying:

I always keep titles for songs and albums kind of in the chamber, and I always wanted to do an album called Son Of Sam because Son Of Sam is just me, that's what it means. My family name is Sam Watson, so that's my legal name, my government [name], to me it meant more of me. A lot of people know me from Tech N9ne's music from the last 13 years you know, so I've always been kind of his co-writer, his sidekick, his hypeman. Travis [O'Guin], who co-founded Strange Music alongside Tech N9ne more than a decade ago, has been [the] business partner, I've always been Tech's creative partner. So the more I put out albums the more I was becoming an individual artist. So I always wanted to do an album called Son Of Sam because it felt like to me a little bit of a liberation, not that I needed to be freed from that because that's been a system that groomed me into being Krizz Kaliko. I'm giving you more of me and that's pretty much where the title came from.

He further explained how he tries to reinvent himself every album, saying:

I think that when you're an artist like myself or Tech N9ne who have a fanbase and have people that are just loyal to us for years, you have to find ways to reinvent yourself every album and that's what I did again with Son Of Sam. I wanna keep that core audience engaged. They love to hear me talk about what I'm going through in my life at the time and that makes it even easier to write, these albums kind of write themselves. I go through mental issues and a lot of people do, I think that's what ended up engaging a core fanbase for me, I started having songs like 'Anxiety' and 'Bipolar', so I just talk about that and all of sudden people are like, 'Wow, I got the same problem too.' So I engage them on a common playing field about emotional and mental disorders which I think all creative people have and I try to give them something new.

== Release and promotion ==
On August 2, 2013, the music video was released for "Why Me". On August 21, 2013, the music video was released for "Scars" featuring Tech N9ne. On August 28, 2013, the music video was released for "Schizophrenia". On September 4, 2013, the music video was released for "W.A.N.S. (We All Need Sex)". on September 11, 2013, the music video was released for "Night Time". On September 25, 2013, the music video was released for "Girls Like That" featuring Bizzy. On October 9, 2013, the music video was released for "Thank God". On January 1, 2014, the music video was released for "Kill for Your Lovin'" featuring Crystal Watson.

== Critical response ==
Professional ratings
Review scores
Source	Rating
AllMusic	3.5/5 stars
RapReviews	7/10

Son of Sam was met with positive reviews from music critics. David Jeffries of AllMusic gave the album three and a half stars out of five, saying "In its way, Son of Sam is another conceptual effort, as the title refers to Krizz's real name, Sam Watson, but that title is more a matter of pride than a guiding force, because when it comes to guests, there aren't many...Strange Music's love of the dramatic and dark remains in full effect, so those who think it suburban and silly should remain far away, but Krizz's most solo effort is also the most filling, even if you need to be predisposed to call it "attractive." Steve Juon of RapReviews gave the album a seven out of ten, saying "Kaliko (real name Samuel Watson) never apologizes or makes excuses for his actions, which gives him the credibility of truthfulness even if not all of his behavior is itself admirable. Yet through it all even at his darkest moments, Krizz always seems to see the light. He raps his most psychotic feelings over dark tracks like "Kill For Your Lovin'" with a sardonic humor, but genuinely seems moved by a higher spirit on songs like "Thank God." The contradictions are what make Krizz Kaliko a fascinating rapper and singer, and although he probably wouldn't be in the rap mainstream without Tech N9ne's friendship, it would be a shame for hip-hop as a whole if he wasn't."

== Commercial performance ==
The album debuted at number 56 on the Billboard 200 chart, with first-week sales of 8,000 copies in the United States. The album has sold 24,000 copies as of March 2016.

== Track listing ==
No.	Title	Writer(s)	Producer(s)	Length
1.	"Intro"	Samuel Watson, Michael Summers	Seven	1:05
2.	"Titties" (featuring Tech N9ne)	S. Watson, M. Summers, Aaron D. Yates	Seven	3:48
3.	"W.A.N.S. (We All Need Sex)"	S. Watson, M. Summers, A. Yates	Seven	2:43
4.	"The Finger"	S. Watson, M. Summers	Seven	3:14
5.	"Reckless" (featuring Ces Cru)	S. Watson, M. Summers, Donnie King, Mike S. Viglione	Seven	4:09
6.	"Girls Like That" (featuring Bizzy)	S. Watson, Brandon Evans, Anthony White	J. White Did It	3:18
7.	"Schizophrenia"	S. Watson, Tramaine Winfrey	Young Fyre, Steven J. Collins	3:31
8.	"Do You Drink"	S. Watson, T. Winfrey	Young Fyre	3:17
9.	"Inside"	S. Watson, M. Summers	Seven	3:30
10.	"Kill for Your Lovin'" (featuring Crystal Watson)	S. Watson, M. Summers	Young Fyre, Nico Marchese	3:35
11.	"Send Your Love" (featuring Kortney Leveringston & IcyRoc Kravyn)	S. Watson, M. Summers, Manzilla Marquis Queen	Seven	3:15
12.	"Night Time"	S. Watson, White	J. White Did It	2:56
13.	"Why Me"	S. Watson, T. Winfrey	Young Fyre, Steven J. Collins	3:59
14.	"Why So Serious"	S. Watson, M. Summers, M. Queen	Seven	4:36
15.	"Scars" (featuring Tech N9ne)	S. Watson, Jonah Appleby, A. Yates	Matic Lee	4:11
16.	"Thank God"	S. Watson, M. Summers	Seven	3:40

Deluxe edition bonus tracks
No.	Title	Length
17.	"Unable"	4:48
18.	"Love Me Bad"	2:54
19.	"Beer Goggles" (featuring Oobergeek)	2:41

Strange Music Online Pre-Order Digital Bonus Tracks
No.	Title	Length
20.	"Death To America"	3:16
21.	"The Devil May Cry"	2:49

== Charts ==
Chart (2013)	Peak position
US Billboard 200	56
US Top R&B/Hip-Hop Albums (Billboard)	15
US Independent Albums (Billboard)	11
