= Ron Ron =

American rapper

RON RON
- Also known as: Double R
- Born: Ronald White
- Origin: Kansas City, Missouri
- Genre: Hip hop
- Years active: 2005-present
- Labels: Bungalo Records through Universal Music Group Distribution, 2008-09

Ronald White, better known by his stage name Ron Ron, is an American rapper and director.

== Biography ==
The name "Ron Ron" was given to him by his grandmother as a child. He decided to keep the nickname in her memory.

Ron Ron is currently an independent artist after a short period with Bungalo Records. He gained minor national attention with a series of mixtapes, one of which included the song "Hey Honey" which secured his first single deal amassing huge totals in digital download sales. He also won 2009 Song Of The Year in Kansas City with "Caked Up", a collaboration with Stik Figa and produced by Greg Enemy.

== Albums ==
- iRONic (2002)
- Ron DMC 1.0

== Mixtapes ==
- Cholie Brown (2005)
- Mr. Mixtape (2006)
- Frank-Einstein (2007)
- Mr No It All (2008)
- Frank-Einstein 2.0 (2008)
- Skitzo-Frinik (2009)
- Left Brain:Right Brain (2011)
- Mr No It All 2 (2013)
- Frank-Einstein 3.0: The Bride Of Frank-Einstein (2014)
