= Kutt Calhoun =

American rapper (born 1977)

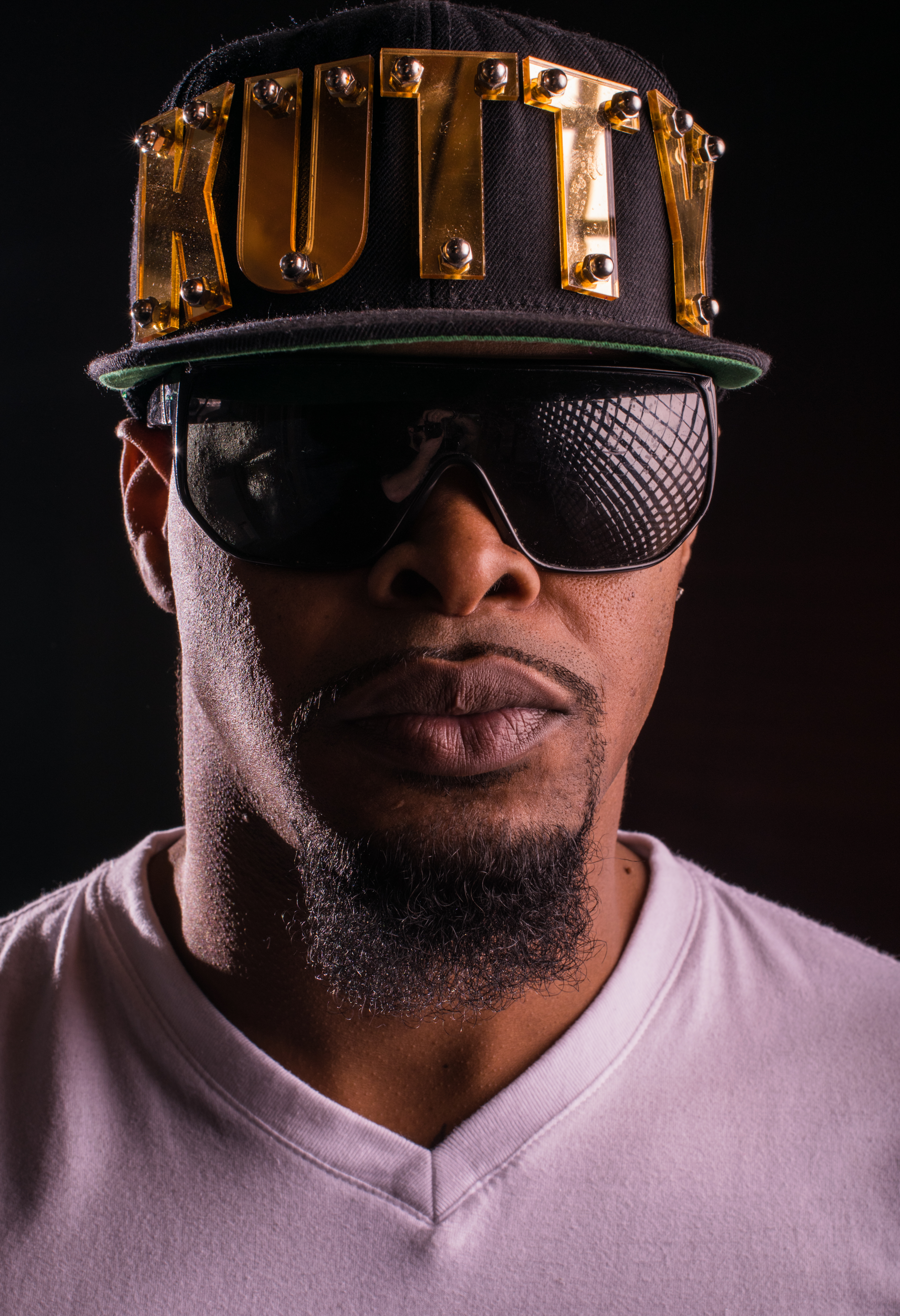
- Calhoun in 2014

Background information
- Also known as: Cutt Dawg, Bloody Kutty Cal, Bloody Kutty
- Born: Melvin Lewis Calhoun Jr. January 1, 1977 (age 49); Kansas City, Missouri, U.S.
- Genres: Midwestern hip-hop
- Occupations: Rapper; songwriter
- Years active: 1993–present
- Labels: Black Gold Entertainment; EMPIRE; Strange
- Website: TheRealKuttCalhoun.com

Melvin Lewis Calhoun Jr. (born January 1, 1977), better known by his stage name Kutt Calhoun, is an American rapper from Kansas City, Missouri. He began his career in the late 1990s as part of the city's underground rap scene, and signed with fellow Missouri-based rapper Tech N9ne's Strange Music as the label's first artist in 2004. Calhoun's debut studio album, B.L.E.V.E. (2004), and its follow-up, Feature Presentation (2008), were both met with critical praise; the latter debuted at number 60 on the Billboard Top R&B/Hip-Hop Albums chart. Calhoun's third album, Raw and Un-Kutt (2010), entered the Billboard 200 and peaked at number 19 on the Top Heatseekers chart.

Between 2011 and 2012, he released two extended plays (EPs): Red-Headed Stepchild and Kelvin. Calhoun's fourth studio album, Black Gold (2013), debuted atop the Top Heatseekers chart and received continued critical praise. He parted ways with Strange Music in 2014 and subsequently founded the record label Black Gold Entertainment. His third EP, Kuttin Loose (2014), was the first release on the latter imprint.

== Music career ==
=== Early years and B.L.E.V.E. (1990s–04) ===
Melvin Lewis Calhoun Jr. was born on January 1, 1977, in Kansas City, Missouri, where he spent his childhood. By the 1990s he was involved in the underground hardcore rap scene of Kansas City, and he began actively recording in the late 1990s. Rapping professionally since 1998, that year Calhoun appeared on the album Center Piece of the Puzzle by Snug Brim, using the alias Cutt Dawg. Afterwards he began working as the hype man of Kansas City rapper Tech N9ne, also helping cofound the Tech N9ne imprint Strange Music in 1999. Calhoun had several features in 2002 on Tech N9ne's album Absolute Power.

After being featured as a guest artist on a number of singles, Kutt would release his debut album, B.L.E.V.E. (standing for Boiling Liquid Expanding Viscous Explosion), on August 10, 2004 through Strange Music. The album features several appearances by Tech N9ne, as well as other local rappers such as Krizz Kaliko and Skatterman & Snug Brim. The album made an appearance on Billboard's Top Heatseekers (West North Central) chart. Rap Reviews greeted the album positively, writing "Calhoun has represented his hometown [Kansas City] admirably on B.L.E.V.E. and seems on the verge of blowing up bigtime. All he needs is more exposure, a slightly tighter selection of beats, and one big video on a Viacom owned network."

=== Feature Presentation (2006–07) ===
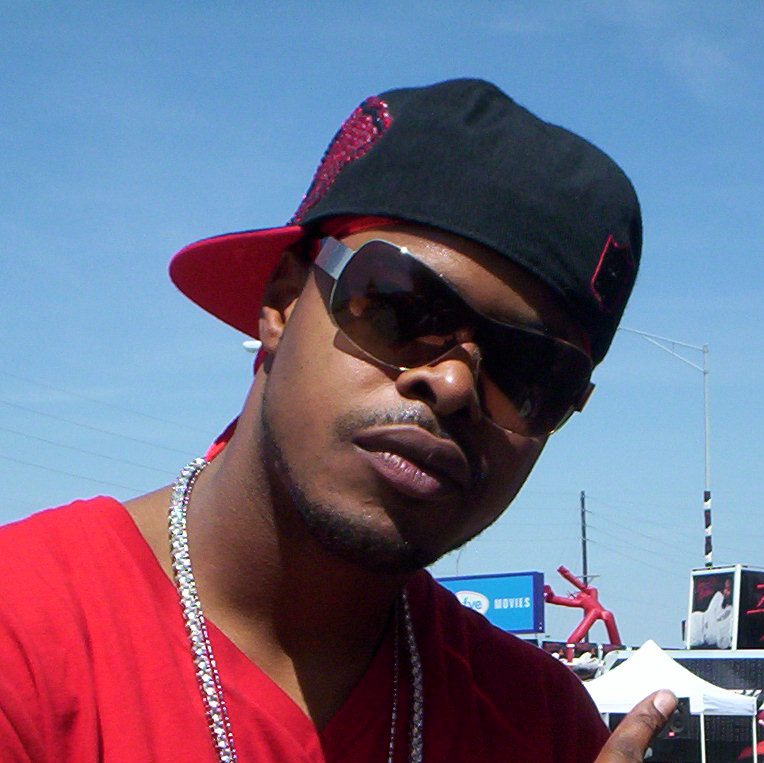
Calhoun in 2008

He self-released his Flamez Mixtape on September 18, 2007. Calhoun's second studio album, Feature Presentation, was released through Strange Music on October 7, 2008. The album saw features from his label mates Tech N9ne, Krizz Kaliko and Skatterman & Snug Brim once again, and also featured several other local rappers. The album has production from Michael "Seven" Summers, Wyshmaster, Matic Lee and Young Fyre. The sophomore release reached No. 60 on Billboard's Top R&B/Hip-Hop Albums in its first week of release, as well as charting at No. 19 on the Top Heatseekers chart. Rap Reviews gave the album a positive review and a score of 8/10. A music video was shot for the album's single "Bunk Rock Bitch," and was released on January 15, 2009, with features from Tech N9ne and Krizz Kaliko.

=== Raw and Un-Kutt and first EPs (2010–12) ===
On May 26, 2010, XXL premiered the video for Calhoun's new single "Naked (Boom Boom Room)" on their website. Kutt Calhoun released his third album, Raw and Un-Kutt, on June 8, 2010. Singles from the album included "Naked (Boom Boom Room)" and "Get Kutt," with features from Brotha Lynch Hung, E-40, Joe Budden, Tech N9ne, and Too Short among others. The album debuted at No. 170 on the Billboard 200 chart in its first week of release. It also reached No. 6 on the Top Heatseekers chart and peaked at No. 15 on the Top Rap Albums chart.

Calhoun released his Red-Headed Stepchild extended play through Strange Music on August 7, 2011. The EP reached No. 23 on Heatseekers Albums and No. 52 on the Top R&B/Hip-Hop Albums chart. He released his EP Kelvin on October 2, 2012, again through Strange Music. Charting higher than its predecessor, the EP reached No. 8 on Top Heatseekers, 41 on the Independent Albums chart, 28 on the US R&B chart, and 21 on the Top Rap Albums chart.

=== Black Gold (2013) ===
Calhoun released his fourth album, Black Gold on February 26, 2013, as what would be his last release on Strange Music. The album was supported by two singles: "Self Preservation" and "I Been Dope," and features guest appearances from Krizz Kaliko, Brotha Lynch Hung, Tech N9ne, and Ron Ron, among others. The album debuted at number 1 on the US Billboard Heatseekers Albums chart and at number 120 on the Billboard 200, with first-week sales of 4,300 copies in the United States. It also peaked at No. 13 on the Independent Albums chart, among other rankings.

Meeting with a largely positive critical response, the publication HipHopDX wrote that "Black Gold revels in its ability to highlight the unique approach of Strange Music while still sounding refreshingly conventional. At 35 years young, Kutt Calhoun is picking up traction when other rappers would be given the checkered flag. Underappreciated or not, that’s something that won’t go unnoticed." Like HipHopDX, David Jeffries of AllMusic also gave the album three and a half stars out of five, praising Calhoun's sense of humor in the lyrics.

=== Black Gold Ent. and Kuttin Loose (2014–16) ===
External videos
- Kutt Calhoun - "Self Preservation" ft. Krizz Kaliko - VEVO (February 5, 2013)
- Kutt Calhoun - "On My Own" ft. Demond Jones (October 19, 2015)

Calhoun decided to form his own imprint in 2014, and he split from Strange Music shortly afterwards on amicable terms. Calhoun went on to found Black Gold Entertainment, and in July 2015 he announced plans to release an EP under the label titled The Kuttin Loose EP. Kuttin Loose was released on July 10, 2015 through Black Gold Entertainment and distributed through Empire Distribution. It peaked at No. 16 on the Heatseekers Albums chart, and No. 41 on the Top Rap Albums chart. HipHopDX gave Kuttin Loose a score of 3.5/5 and a positive review. Wrote MetroActive, on "the Kuttin Loose EP, he demonstrates a devastating flow, razor sharp wit and some downright nasty Dirty South production." Among other themes, album's single "Handz Up (Shut Shit Down)" explicitly addressed police brutality, with Kutt directing the music video himself. By the end of 2015, Calhoun had embarked on his On My Own Tour. On June 3, 2016, Calhoun collabed in his single called "ALIVE" with The Jokerr. On July 13, 2016, Calhoun collabed in his single called "Never Know" with Automatic.

== Discography ==
Studio albums

- B.L.E.V.E. (2004)
- Feature Presentation (2008)
- Raw and Un-Kutt (2010)
- Black Gold (2013)
- Persona Non Grata: Truth Be Told (2019)
- T.D.I.A.L. (2024)

== See also ==
- List of American rappers
- Strange Music discography
- List of hip hop musicians
- Midwestern hip-hop
