= Krizz Kaliko =

American rapper from Missouri

Background information
- Also known as: Big Krizz Kaliko
- Born: Samuel William Christopher Watson; March 7, 1974 (age 52); Kansas City, Missouri, U.S.
- Genres: Hip hop, rap rock, alternative hip hop
- Occupations: Rapper; singer; songwriter; voice actor
- Instruments: Vocals; guitar
- Works: Discography
- Years active: 1999–present
- Labels: Ear House Inc. (current); Strange Music (former)
- Website: Official website

Samuel William Christopher Watson (born March 7, 1974), better known by his stage name Krizz Kaliko, is an American rapper, singer, songwriter, and voice actor. He is a longtime collaborator with fellow hometown native Tech N9ne and was signed to Strange Music from its inception in 1999 up to forming his own label Ear House Inc. in 2021.

Krizz Kaliko has released seven studio albums and has collaborated with other artists such as Snow tha Product, E-40, T-Pain, Twista, Eminem, Lil Wayne, Paul Wall, Jelly Roll, Chamillionaire, Snoop Dogg, 8Ball & MJG, Kendrick Lamar, and Ice Cube.

== Career ==
Krizz Kaliko began his musical career in the late 1990s when he began working with local producer IcyRoc Kraven. Another local rapper by the name of Tech N9ne was also collaborating with IcyRoc at the time, which led to the two rappers meeting. At the time, Tech N9ne was working on a song titled "Who You Came To See" and Kaliko made a comment that the song could have a better hook. Tech offered up the opportunity to prove his case, and Tech was blown away when Kaliko did. Tech would bring Kaliko into his "inner circle", which would eventually result in Kaliko signing to the new-found label Strange Music co-owned by Tech N9ne and Travis O'Guin.

Since then, Kaliko has often contributed to albums put out by Tech N9ne, be it being featured as a rapper or simply providing background vocals for tracks on the album. Although most of his work is that of his collaborations with Tech N9ne, he has also performed similar tasks for former labelmates Kutt Calhoun, Rittz, and fellow labelmates Skatterman & Snug Brim, Ces Cru, and Prozak. Other collaborations include tracks with the Kottonmouth Kings, Potluck, E-40, T-Pain, Twiztid, Andy Mineo, and RM from South Korean group BTS .

His debut album, Vitiligo, released on May 6, 2008, charted on several Billboard charts, including peaking at number 19 on the Top Independent Albums in the week of May 28, 2008. In the same week, he peaked at number 167 on the Billboard 200.

His second studio album, Genius, was released on July 14, 2009.

A number of his songs can be heard in the background of the strip club scenes in the movie Big Fan starring Patton Oswalt.

Kaliko chose the title Shock Treatment for his third studio album. Other titles he considered were Son of Sam and Walk on Water.

S.I.C., his first EP, was released on May 17, 2011. In June 2011, he was featured on Winnipeg's Most's second single, "Forgive Me", from their second album, GoodFellaz.

On May 15, 2012, Kaliko released his fourth studio album, titled Kickin' and Screamin'. It is currently his highest charting album on the Billboard 200. The album has features from long-time collaborator Tech N9ne, as well as rappers Twista, Chamillionaire, T-Pain, Twiztid and Rittz, while the production is almost entirely handled by Seven.

In November, Kaliko released his second EP, Neh'mind. The song "Damage" featuring Snow Tha Product was made the lead single. A video for "Damage" was shot and released on YouTube on December 14, and received over 100,000 views in two weeks.

On August 27, 2013, Kaliko released his fifth album, Son of Sam. It features guest appearances from Tech N9ne, CES Cru, Kortney Leveringston, IcyRoc Kravyn, and his wife Crystal Watson. The album debuted at number 56 on the Billboard 200 chart, with first-week sales of 8,000 copies in the United States.

On April 8, 2016, Kaliko released his sixth studio album, GO. Unlike his previous albums, which were predominantly hip-hop, GO is his first R&B/pop album. The album features labelmates Tech N9ne, Stevie Stone, Rittz, CES Cru, Wrekonize and JL B.Hood. It went on to chart as the number 4 Rap album on Billboard and number 28 in the Top 200.

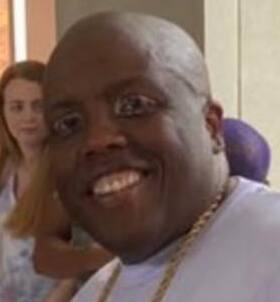
Watson in 2023

On October 6, 2019, Kaliko announced his intention to leave Strange Music on social media. On October 20, 2019, however, he appeared to have a change of heart, signing a new contract with Strange Music on stage.

On September 18, 2020, Kaliko returned with his seventh album, Legend, his first project in four years.

On May 15, 2021, it was announced during Kaliko's virtual concert event "The Reveal" that he had officially left Strange Music to form his own label Ear House Inc. with his wife Crystal.

In 2022, Kaliko collaborated with few smaller indie artists by the name of Anthony Boggs and Messy The Man with their song "Loud Child".

Kaliko voiced Dinobot in the third chapter of Transformers: War for Cybertron Trilogy, released on July 29, 2021, as well as Leroy Smith in the English dub of Tekken: Bloodline, which released on August 18, 2022.

== Personal life ==
Kaliko is afflicted with an autoimmune form of vitiligo, a skin condition characterized by smooth, white patches on various parts of the body, caused by the loss of natural pigment. Several of these patches are clearly visible on his face. He used the name of the disease as the title for his debut album.

Kaliko has also been diagnosed with bipolar disorder. He named a track on his second album after the disorder.

== Filmography ==
Year	Title	Role	Notes
2021	Transformers: War for Cybertron Trilogy	Dinobot	4 episodes
2022	Tekken: Bloodline	Leroy Smith	2 episodes

== Discography ==
Studio albums

- Vitiligo (2008)
- Genius (2009)
- Shock Treatment (2010)
- Kickin' and Screamin' (2012)
- Son of Sam (2013)
- GO (2016)
- Legend (2020)
