= Fragile (Tech N9ne song) =

Single by Tech N9ne featuring Kendrick Lamar, ¡Mayday! and Kendall Morgan

from the album Something Else
- Released: July 17, 2013
- Recorded: 2013
- Genre: Hip-hop; rap rock
- Length: 3:55
- Label: Strange Music
- Songwriters: Aaron Yates; Benjamin Miller; Bernardo Garcia; Daniel Emilio Perez; Gianni Perocarpi; Kendall Morgan; Kendrick Duckworth; Ralfy Valencia
- Producers: ¡Mayday!; Daniel "Keys" Perez; Ralfy "FAFA" Valencia

Tech N9ne singles chronology
"So Dope (They Wanna)" (2013)	"Fragile" (2013)	"Hiccup" (2013)

Kendrick Lamar singles chronology
"Collard Greens" (2013)	"Fragile" (2013)	"Give It 2 U" (2013)

¡Mayday! singles chronology
"Fragile" (2013)	"Tabletops" (2014)

Kendall Morgan singles chronology
"Fragile" (2013)	"Fadin" (2015)

Music video
- "Fragile" on YouTube

"Fragile" is a song by American rapper Tech N9ne featuring Kendrick Lamar, ¡Mayday!, and Kendall Morgan from the former's thirteenth studio album, Something Else (2013). It was released by Strange Music as the second single from the album on July 17, 2013. It was produced by ¡Mayday!, Daniel "Keys" Perez, Ralfy "FAFA" Valencia, and Michel Goodfriend.

"Fragile" details each rapper's disdain for music journalists and the criticism of their music. Ironically, it received generally positive reviews from music critics. It peaked at number 38 on the US Billboard Hot R&B/Hip-Hop Songs chart. A music video was released on February 9, 2014, featuring the artists rapping and singing in an abandoned warehouse.

== Writing and production ==
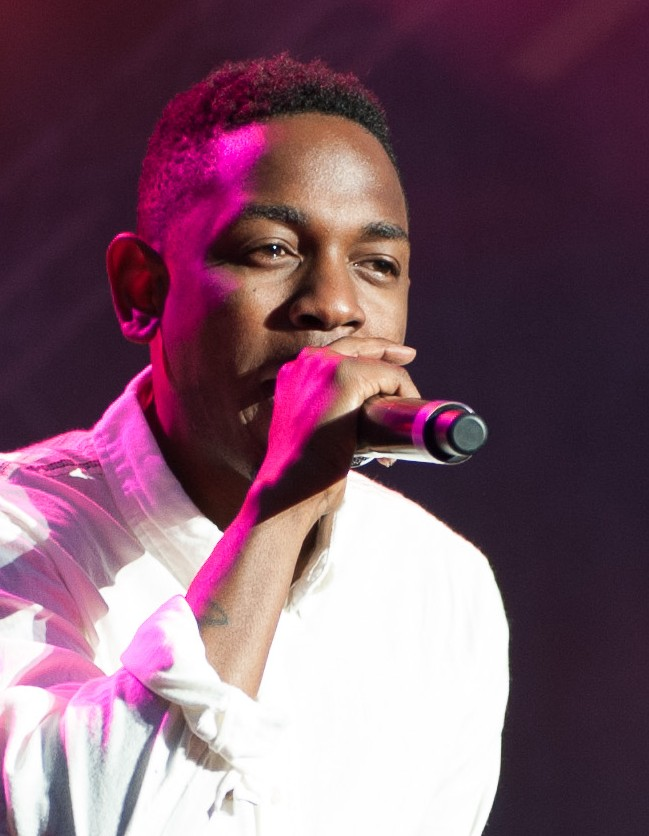
Due to the importance of "Fragile" in his mind, Tech N9ne wanted a strong feature on it, for which he would choose rapper Kendrick Lamar.

"Fragile" was inspired by Max Bell, a writer for LA Weekly who referred to Tech N9ne's Paid Dues performance as "gimmicky and redundant". He would later thank the writer during an interview for inspiring him to make it. It details each rapper's disdain for music journalists and the criticism of their music, as they address the critics and journalists that write about their music. Both artists rap with rapid-fire, aggressive verses, while Wrekonize and Bernz of ¡Mayday! and Kendall Morgan both sing the chorus.

"Fragile"'s composition began after Strange Music label-mate ¡Mayday! sent Tech N9ne their and Kendall Morgan's vocals on it. He said the introspective chorus made him take a moment to reflect on his own rhymes. Following the writing of his own verse, Tech N9ne decided he wanted another major rapper on it after him. He stated, "It was already elite, so I needed somebody who could come after me, and there aren't too many who can do it." After contemplating which rapper would be featured on the track, even sending it to Eminem with hopes he would get on board, Tech N9ne decided to feature American rapper Kendrick Lamar. This track is Tech N9ne and Lamar's second collaboration.

"Fragile"'s production was created by ¡Mayday!, Ralfy "FAFA" Valencia, and Daniel "Keys" Perez. The instrumental is centered on a brokenhearted guitar and piano beat, with a simple drum pattern for the verses, before escalating with keys and guitar riffs for the hook. Yelawolf was originally supposed to appear on it, but he did not record his verse in time.

== Release and reception ==
On July 17, 2013, "Fragile" featuring Kendrick Lamar, ¡Mayday!, and Kendall Morgan was premiered via Complex. Following its premiere, it was made available for purchase with the iTunes pre-order for Something Else, also being released to Amazon.com as the album's second official single. Tech N9ne included it on the set list of his NPR Tiny Desk Concert on August 30, 2018.

"Fragile" received generally positive reviews from music critics. Arasia Graham of HipHopDX called it "a contender for best on the album." Steve Jones of USA Today also named it one of the album's best songs. Sha Be Allah of The Source called it "a slow tempo, rimshot driven track blessed with lyrics from arguably the best of the underground and mainstream." AllMusic's David Jeffries stated that "Fragile" "ups the album artistically with jazz club ambience and the great Kendrick Lamar as guest star." Jonathan Sawyer of Hypetrak said it is "impressive all the way around", and called it "easily one of the standouts from N9ne's forthcoming Something Else album." Wyatt Westlake of HotNewHipHop placed it at number one in a ranking of the seven best Tech N9ne songs.

Commercially, "Fragile" peaked at number 135 in France. In the United States, it peaked at number 16, 38, and 14 on the Bubbling Under Hot 100, Hot R&B/Hip-Hop Songs, and Rhythmic Airplay charts, respectively. In year-end charts, it finished number 49 on Rhythmic Airplay. "Fragile" was certified gold in New Zealand and the United States.

== Music video ==
On December 3, 2013, Tech N9ne shot the music video for "Fragile" with director Anthony Devera. Kendrick Lamar, Bernz and Wrekonize of ¡Mayday!, and Kendall Morgan were all present in their respective roles. On February 9, 2014, the music video was released for "Fragile". The video features the artists rapping and singing in an abandoned warehouse.

== Charts ==
=== Weekly charts ===
Weekly chart performance
Chart (2013–14)	Peak position
France (SNEP)	135
US Bubbling Under Hot 100 (Billboard)	16
US Hot R&B/Hip-Hop Songs (Billboard)	38
US Rhythmic Airplay (Billboard)	14

=== Year-end charts ===
Year-end chart performance
Chart (2014)	Position
US Rhythmic Airplay (Billboard)	49

== Certifications ==
Region	Certification	Certified units/sales
New Zealand (RMNZ)	Gold	15,000^{‡}
United States (RIAA)	Gold	500,000^{‡}
^{‡} Sales+streaming figures based on certification alone.
