= Have a Nice Life (album) =

Studio album by Murs
- Released: May 18, 2015
- Genre: Hip-hop
- Length: 46:33
- Label: Strange Music
- Producer: Curtiss King; Jesse Shatkin; ¡Mayday!; The Arsonist

Murs chronology
¡MursDay! (2014)	Have a Nice Life (2015)	Captain California (2017)

Singles from Have a Nice Life
- 1. "Okey Dog" Released: March 12, 2015; 2. "No More Control" Released: April 14, 2015

Have a Nice Life is the ninth studio album by American rapper Murs. It was released on May 18, 2015, via Strange Music. Production was handled by Jesse Shatkin, ¡Mayday!, Curtiss King and The Arsonist. It features guest appearances from E-40, King Fantastic, MNDR and Ryan "Myagi" Evans.

The album debuted at number 94 on the Billboard 200, number 11 on the Top R&B/Hip-Hop Albums and number 12 on the Independent Albums charts in the United States.

== Critical reception ==
Professional ratings
Aggregate scores
Source	Rating
Metacritic	75/100
Review scores
Source	Rating
AllMusic	4/5 stars
HipHopDX	3.5/5
Pitchfork	6.3/10
RapReviews	7/10
Tom Hull	A−
XXL	XL (4/5)

Have a Nice Life was met with generally favorable reviews reviews from music critics. At Metacritic, which assigns a normalized rating out of 100 to reviews from mainstream publications, the album received an average score of 75 based on five reviews.

Kellan Miller of XXL praised the album, writing: "'I Miss Mikey' speaks not only to Murs' own deceased homies, but acts as an inspirational call to ignore fears of mortality in the face of death and leave a lasting mark. With Have A Nice Life, an album that will not only impress longtime admirers but newcomers as well, Murs should have no problem with that task". AllMusic's David Jeffries claimed that "every track here punches with a purpose". Andrew Gretchko of HipHopDX stated: "while some may be upset that Murs isn't the unruly rapper he once was, he's managed to craft a project that remains true while growing up enough to talk about life in a radiant, maturity tinged glow". Sy Shackleford of RapReviews found "some areas of this album [are] a little redundant". Marcus J. Moore of Pitchfork wrote: "as a whole, Have a Nice Life stands as a decent collection of songs that, while palatable, casually floats by in a sea of average beats by Jesse Shatkin, who produced much of the album".

== Track listing ==
No.	Title	Writer(s)	Producer(s)	Length
1.	"Have a Nice Life"	Nicholas Carter; Christopher D. Jenkins; Derrek O. Clarke	The Arsonist; Derrek "Doc" Clarke (co.)	3:30
2.	"Surprises" (featuring Ryan "Myagi" Evans)	Carter; Ryan Evans; Bernardo Garcia; Gianni Perocarpi; Daniel Emilio Perez	Bernz; Gianni Ca$h; Danny "Keys" Perez (co.)	2:50
3.	"Mi Corazon"	Carter; Amanda Lucille Warner; Jesse Samuel Shatkin	Jesse Shatkin	3:31
4.	"Woke Up Dead"	Carter; Shatkin	Jesse Shatkin	2:56
5.	"PTSD" (featuring E-40)	Carter; Earl Stevens; D'wan Howard	Curtiss King	3:15
6.	"Okey Dog"	Carter; Shatkin; J. Taylor	Jesse Shatkin	3:18
7.	"Pussy and Pizza"	Carter; Shatkin	Jesse Shatkin	3:17
8.	"Two Step" (featuring King Fantastic)	Carter; Maurice D. Washington; Shatkin	Jesse Shatkin	3:06
9.	"No More Control" (featuring MNDR)	Carter; Warner; Shatkin	Jesse Shatkin	3:49
10.	"Skatin Through the City"	Carter; Benjamin John Miller; Aaron Eckhart; Garcia; Perocarpi	Plex Luthor	3:20
11.	"Anyways"	Carter; Shatkin	Jesse Shatkin	3:09
12.	"The Worst"	Carter; Miller; Eckhart; Garcia; Perocarpi; Andrews Diaz Mujica	¡Mayday!	3:35
13.	"Black Girls Be Like"	Carter; Keith Cooper; Perocarpi	Gianni Ca$h	3:11
14.	"I Miss Mikey"	Carter; Shatkin	Jesse Shatkin	3:46
Total length:				46:33

Strange Music pre-order bonus track
No.	Title	Writer(s)	Producer(s)	Length
15.	"Fun-eral" (featuring Ces Cru)	Carter; Donnie King; Mike Viglione; Shatkin	Jesse Shatkin	4:00
Total length:				50:33

== Charts ==
Chart (2015)	Peak position
US Billboard 200	94
US Top R&B/Hip-Hop Albums (Billboard)	11
US Independent Albums (Billboard)	12
