= The Storm (Tech N9ne album) =

Studio album by Tech N9ne
- Released: December 9, 2016
- Recorded: 2015–16
- Genre: Hip-hop
- Length: 60:01
- Label: Strange Music
- Producer: Travis O'Guin (exec.); Beatnick; Burna; DJ Rek; Gianni Ca$h; JMac Tracks; Jordan Omley; K-Salaam; Major Seven; Makzilla; Michael Mani; Mr. Porter; N4; The Pushers; Seven

Tech N9ne chronology
Strangeulation Vol. II (2015)	The Storm (2016)	Dominion (2017)

Singles from The Storm
- 1. "Erbody But Me" Released: September 9, 2016; 2. "I Get It Now" Released: September 9, 2016; 3. "What If It Was Me" Released: September 9, 2016; 4. "Sriracha" Released: October 14, 2016; 5. "Choosin" Released: October 25, 2016; 6. "Get Off Me" Released: December 7, 2016

The Storm is the seventeenth studio album by American rapper Tech N9ne. It was released on December 9, 2016, by Strange Music. The album serves as a follow-up to his 1999 album The Calm Before the Storm. The album features guest appearances from Gary Clark Jr., Problem, Joyner Lucas, Logic, Marsha Ambrosious, Jonathan Davis and Boyz II Men alongside fellow Strange Music rappers such as Krizz Kaliko, Stevie Stone, Murs and Big Scoob, among others.

== Singles ==
The album's lead single, called "Erbody But Me" was released on September 9, 2016. The song features guest appearances from Bizzy, and the Strange Music's label-mate Krizz Kaliko, with the production by Tech N9ne's longtime collaborator Seven.

== Response ==
Tech N9ne was very upset about the mixed reception of the album: "I tried to go back and try to make it a little bit more grittier like my first record, and the response that I got wasn't the one that I wanted. So I was hurt. I wanted people to respond to a weed song I did with Boyz II Men called "Buddha." Now who could get Boyz II Men on a song called "Buddha?" I finally got to work with Jonathan Davis of Korn. We did "Starting to Turn." It was so humongous. Finally got to work with Gary Clark Jr. and do a song. Very humongous. Nobody — I finally got to work with Marsha Ambrosius of Floetry. I've loved her music for years, since Floetry first dropped. When they wrote the song for Michael Jackson, "Butterfly," I was tuned in. No response. Not the — I mean, my fans bought it. But it was like, "Eh." Broke my heart."

== Track listing ==
Kingdom
No.	Title	Writer(s)	Producer(s)	Length
1.	"Godspeed"	Aaron Yates; Michael Summers	Seven	4:07
2.	"Need Jesus" (featuring Stevie Stone and J.L.)	Yates; Stephen Williams; Jason Varnes; Freek van Workum; Nick Luscombe	N4	4:02
3.	"Sriracha" (featuring Logic and Joyner Lucas)	Yates; Summers; Sir Robert Hall II; Gary Lucas, Jr.	Seven	3:47
4.	"Wifi (Skit)"			0:41
5.	"Wifi (WeeFee)"	Yates; Summers; Samuel Watson	Seven	3:17
6.	"Erbody but Me" (featuring Bizzy and Krizz Kaliko)	Yates; Summers; Watson	Seven	3:17
7.	"Get Off Me" (featuring Problem and Darrein Safron)	Yates; Safron; Summers; Jason Martin	Seven	3:19

Clown Town
No.	Title	Writer(s)	Producer(s)	Length
8.	"I Get It Now" (featuring Krizz Kaliko)	Yates; Watson; Summers; Steven Lambert	Seven	3:49
9.	"Hold On Me" (featuring Kate Rose)	Yates; Summers; Kathryn Caggianelli	Seven	4:19
10.	"Starting to Turn" (featuring Jonathan Davis)	Yates; Summers; Watson; Jonathan Davis	Seven	3:33
11.	"Poisoning the Well"	Yates; Watson; Summers	Seven	3:41

G. Zone
No.	Title	Writer(s)	Producer(s)	Length
12.	"Buss Serves" (featuring Big Scoob and Young Devi D)	Yates; Summers; Steward Ashby; Devion Williams	Seven	3:57
13.	"Buddha" (featuring Boyz II Men and Adrian Truth)	Yates; Summers; Nathan Morris; Wanya Morris; Michael Bivins	Seven	3:37
14.	"No Gun Control" (featuring Gary Clark Jr. and Krizz Kaliko)	Yates; Watson; Summers; Gary Clark Jr.	Seven	3:44
15.	"What If It Was Me" (featuring Krizz Kaliko)	Yates; Watson; van Workum; Luscombe	N4	4:08
16.	"Anywhere" (featuring Marsha Ambrosius)	Yates; Marsha Ambrosius; Denaun Porter; Shaphan Williams; Diondria Thornton; Christopher Thornton	Mr. Porter	3:27
17.	"The Needle" (featuring Krizz Kaliko)	Yates; Watson; Summers	Seven	4:58

Deluxe edition
No.	Title	Writer(s)	Producer	Length
1.	"Godspeed"	Yates; Summers	Seven	4:07
2.	"Need Jesus" (featuring Stevie Stone and J.L.)	Yates; Williams; Varnes; van Workum; Luscombe	N4	4:02
3.	"Sriracha" (featuring Logic and Joyner Lucas)	Yates; Summers; Hall II; Lucas, Jr.	Seven	3:47
4.	"Wifi" (Skit)			0:41
5.	"Wifi (WeeFee)"	Yates; Summers; Watson	Seven	3:17
6.	"Erbody but Me" (featuring Bizzy and Krizz Kaliko)	Yates; Watson; Summers	Seven	3:17
7.	"Get Off Me" (featuring Problem and Darrein Safron)	Yates; Summers; Safron; Martin	Seven	3:19
8.	"I Get It Now" (featuring Krizz Kaliko)	Yates; Watson; Summers; Lambert	Seven	3:49
9.	"Hold On Me" (featuring Kate Rose)	Yates; Summers; Caggianelli	Seven	4:19
10.	"Starting to Turn" (featuring Jonathan Davis)	Yates; Watson; Summers; Davis	Seven	3:33
11.	"Poisoning the Well"	Yates; Watson; Summers	Seven	3:41
12.	"Buss Serves" (featuring Big Scoob and Young Devi D)	Yates; Summers; Ashby; Williams	Seven	3:57
13.	"No Runnin to Ya Mama"	Yates; Summers	Seven	3:49
14.	"Buddha" (featuring Boyz II Men and Adrian Truth)	Yates; Summers; N. Morris; W. Morris; Bivins	Seven	3:37
15.	"No Gun Control" (featuring Gary Clark Jr. and Krizz Kaliko)	Yates; Watson; Summers; Clark, Jr.	Seven	3:44
16.	"What If It Was Me" (featuring Krizz Kaliko)	Yates; Watson; van Workum; Luscombe	Seven	4:08
17.	"Anywhere" (featuring Marsha Ambrosius)	Yates; Ambrosius; Porter; Williams; D. Thornton; C. Thornton	Mr. Porter	3:25
18.	"Til I'm Gone" (featuring Kiddo A.I.)	Yates; Amanda Ibanez; Gianni Perocarpi; Ralfy Valencia; Antonio Olivera; Daniel Perez; Keith Cooper; Leonardo Zapata	The Pushers; Gianni Ca$h	4:37
19.	"The Needle" (featuring Krizz Kaliko)	Yates; Watson; Summers	Seven	4:58
20.	"The Long Way" (featuring Krizz Kaliko)	Yates; Watson; Omar Walker	Major Seven	4:22

Bonus disc
No.	Title	Writer(s)	Producer	Length
21.	"Fuh What?"	Yates; Summers; Manzilla Queen; Jake McDounough	Seven; Makzilla; JMac Tracks	3:28
22.	"Own Thang" (performed by J.L.)	Varnes; Chadburn Won Buxton	Burna	3:49
23.	"Choosin" (featuring Brandoshis)	Yates; van Workum; Luscombe; Branen Drone	N4	3:29
24.	"Ignorance" (performed by Darrein Safron)	Safron; Jordan Omley; Michael Mani	Omley; Mani	3:20
25.	"Deleted" (performed by Mackenzie Nicole)	Mackenzie O'Guin; Watson; Summers	Seven	3:36
26.	"Gridlock" (performed by Ces Cru)	Mike Viglione; Donnie King; Summers	Seven	4:04
27.	"Last Day Alive" (performed by Wrekonize)	Benjamin Miller; Kayvon Sarfehjooy; Nicolas Philips	Beatnick; K-Salaam	3:47
28.	"Kansas City" (featuring The Popper and Rich the Factor)	Yates; Summers; Walter Edwin; Richard Johnson	Seven	2:57
29.	"Wet"	Yates; Summers	Seven	3:30
30.	"Colossus" (performed by Murs)	Nick Carter; RaShann Chambliss	DJ Rek	3:04
31.	"Mind Kcuf" (featuring Krizz Kaliko)	Yates; Watson; Summers	Seven	3:29
32.	"We're Not Sorry" (featuring Mackenzie Nicole)	Yates; Summers; O'Guin	Seven	3:49

Strange Music pre-order track
No.	Title	Length
33.	"The Thing" (featuring Krizz Kaliko)	3:01

== Charts ==
Chart (2016)	Peak position
Canadian Albums (Billboard)	39
New Zealand Heatseekers Albums (RMNZ)	2
US Billboard 200	12
US Independent Albums (Billboard)	3
US Top R&B/Hip-Hop Albums (Billboard)	4
