= Hood Go Crazy =

Single by Tech N9ne featuring 2 Chainz and B.o.B

from the album Special Effects
- Released: February 26, 2015
- Recorded: 2014
- Genre: Hip hop
- Length: 3:46
- Label: Strange
- Songwriters: Aaron Yates; Tauheed Epps; Bobby Ray Simmons
- Producer: N4

Tech N9ne singles chronology
"Aw Yeah?" (2015)	"Hood Go Crazy" (2015)	"Speedom" (2015)

2 Chainz singles chronology
"Mama Ain't Proud" (2014)	"Hood Go Crazy" (2015)	"Double Tap" (2015)

B.o.B singles chronology
"Not for Long" (2014)	"Hood Go Crazy" (2015)	"Devil" (2015)

Music video
- "Hood Go Crazy" on YouTube

"Hood Go Crazy" is a song by American rapper Tech N9ne featuring fellow American rappers 2 Chainz and B.o.B, released on February 26, 2015 as the lead single from the former's fifteenth studio album Special Effects (2015). Produced by N4, the song was certified Platinum by the Recording Industry Association of America (RIAA) on June 17, 2020, for selling over one million units in the United States.

== Music video ==
The music video debuted on MTV on April 26, 2015.

== Commercial performance ==
The song is Tech N9ne's highest charting single as a lead artist, peaking at No. 90 on the Billboard Hot 100, becoming his only song to chart.

== Charts ==
=== Weekly charts ===
Chart (2015)	Peak position
US Billboard Hot 100	90
US Hot R&B/Hip-Hop Songs (Billboard)	28
US Rhythmic Airplay (Billboard)	10

=== Year-end charts ===
Chart (2015)	Peak position
US Rhythmic (Billboard)	36

== Certifications ==
Region	Certification	Certified units/sales
New Zealand (RMNZ)	Gold	15,000^{‡}
United States (RIAA)	Platinum	1,000,000^{‡}
^{‡} Sales+streaming figures based on certification alone.
