= Therapy (Tech N9ne EP) =

EP by Tech N9ne
- Released: November 5, 2013
- Recorded: 2013
- Genres: Nu metal, rap metal
- Length: 27:12
- Label: Strange Music
- Producers: Ross Robinson, Seven

Tech N9ne chronology
Something Else (2013)	Therapy (2013)	Strangeulation (2014)

Therapy is the sixth extended play (EP) by American rapper Tech N9ne. It was released on November 5, 2013, by Strange Music. The EP was produced by Ross Robinson and features guest appearances from Krizz Kaliko, Bernz, Wrekonize, Caroline Dupuy Heerwagen and Tyler Lyon. Session musicians include guitarist Wes Borland of Limp Bizkit and Black Light Burns and hardcore punk drummer Sammy Siegler. The EP is categorized by an aggressive nu metal sound.

== Background ==
On February 8, 2012, on the Strange Music blog, it was announced that the EP would be released on November 5, 2013. In September 2013, during an interview with Artistdirect, Tech N9ne spoke about recording the EP, saying: "It was beautiful I went to Ross Robinson's studio in Venice Beach, and I sat in the sand and wrote from my head. We recorded everything in his house. I did six songs there, and I did the seventh song yesterday in Kansas City. I want to send it to Ross and see what he thinks. It's fucking amazing to work with Ross Robinson. He's truly a muse. He's a super muse. He brought a lot of shit out of me. Wes was staying in Ross's house for a while as I was doing this. He came and played on damn near everything. He was trying to get some music out. I happened to be the guy down there trying to get some music out so we got some music out together. We're trying to get it all together so it can be the best for the fans. It's totally different from anything Tech N9ne. It has elements of Tech N9ne because it's me. I'm going to be rapping and singing and shit. I hope everybody takes to it."

He also spoke about the lyrical vibe on the EP, saying:

"It's like this man. In the thank you section of Something Else, I said, "I can't wait to see what doors this album opens up for me". So far, it gave me all the content for Therapy. The people who called me "Devil Worshipper" and all of these things are now sucking the dick. I've got a song that goes, "We don't need no head now we're good!" You were dogging us back then. We don't need head now. We got enough head as it is. "Head Now" is one of my favorite songs. There are songs about problems with me and my girl. I dreamt a song out there. Ross came to me in a dream. We were sitting at his control desk and he pointed down at a record, and it said "Hiccup". He looked at me and said, "Hiccup". I woke up, and I had an idea for a song called "Hiccup". I told Ross and Wes. They recorded me doing hiccups and shit. They made a beat around it. I left and went to lunch. I came back, and they had it dude! It was fucking crazy. We just thought it up right there. We did one called "When Demons Come". Everything came from getting recognition from Something Else. That's how my life is. I like my life. "So Much Love" on Something Else had me ready for "When Demons Come". There's so much love you can get lost in this shit. You don't know when something's going to hit. You have to be ready with angels when demons come. Songs like that just came out of me."

In September 2013, during an interview with the Portland Music Scene Examiner, Tech N9ne spoke about working on the EP, saying: "It's fucking insane, it's like heaven… and you go to heaven to talk about all your hell and bring all your hell out. Right there on Venice beach, in this big fucking house on Venice Beach man, you're writing right in front of the water, man. It's heaven, but you're getting all your hell out. It's therapy- that's why I called it that; with Ross, he brings all that out in me man." He also spoke about working on the EP with producer Ross Robinson, saying: "Yeah, it's wonderful, we did 7 songs; Wes Borland came and played on a lot of it, Sammy Siegler played drums, Alfredo Ortiz came and played bongos from the Beastie Boys, a couple of bass players came through… It's wonderful man, wonderfully done. I hope people like it, because I love it. It's done now, I'm checking the mixes today- I checked two of them today already. Yeah, we're there, you know." On November 25, 2013, the music video was released for "Hiccup".

In January 2014, in an interview with New Noise, he spoke about what inspired him to make the EP, saying "As you know, the name of Strange Music was inspired by The Doors. I'm a big Doors fan, without Jim Morrison, without Robby Krieger, without Jon Densmore, without Ray Manzarek rest his soul, I would have never called this Strange Music. We are all a strange individual in the hood. We've always had that rock energy; the first song "Tormented" on our first release Anghellic has a rock overtone to it. A lot of our music throughout the years, such as "Riot Maker" [from Everready (The Religion)] has a rock edge. For years I've been promising my fans the K.A.B.O.S.H. album, which stands for "Killing America's Belief On Society's Hoods," because there was no belief that niggas can rock out like this [laughs]. I never did it because the band we were going to use had some problems at the time, so we put it on the backburner. So I did Therapy as an appetizer and if people like it, I will get together with the band and make a full album. I've been planning to do this for over a decade. The idea for Therapy was always there, but the way we did it with producer Ross Robinson on Venice Beach was a change of scenery and an overall change in atmosphere. It's the change I needed to make this EP truly different from the "rock-ish" stuff I've done before. Thank you to everybody that was involved and Ross Robinson for getting those seven songs out of me, because I love them and everyone does too!"

He also spoke about what inspired the song "Hiccup", saying: "Wow, it's crazy you picked that one because it came to me in a dream. Ross Robinson was in my dream, sitting at his desk in front of his monitor at his studio. He pointed down at a black record cover that had these bold white letters that said 'Hiccup.' I woke up and I put the idea of the drums in my little Dictaphone recorder. When I went to the studio the next day, Wes [Borland] was there, as was Sid Wilson and DJ Starscream [from Slipknot]. I told Ross about the dream for the idea and he said "Show me." I was a little nervous but I busted it out right in front of them, then I thought "Okay I'm a little embarrassed, I'm going to go up the street and have lunch." I came back an hour later and they had the skeleton of the beat waiting for me. I just went out there and wrote what was on my mind, I was watching CNN earlier and I was seeing a lot of things that were disturbing me, like the whole Amanda Berry and Charles Ramsey situation. There was also that whole Vatican cover up about the priests touching the little boys; there are messed up things in this world. So I just wrote about all of this and it became an explosion."

== Critical reception ==
Professional ratings
Review scores
Source	Rating
AllMusic	4/5 stars
Artistdirect	5/5 stars
Exclaim!	7/10

Therapy was met with generally positive reviews from music critics. Erin Lowers of Exclaim! gave the album a seven out of ten, saying "While it's never been a secret that Tech N9ne's music often crosses into the heavy metal and rock realms, Therapy officially lets the cat out of the bag. As a hip-hop album, Therapy is heavily disconnected, but as a cross-genre project, this EP stands on its own." Rick Florino of Artistdirect gave the album five out of five stars, saying "Throughout, Tech and Ross talk, making up the sessions. It adds a deeper element to Therapy. This is one of Strange Music's most brilliant and brutal offerings yet. It also sees Tech starting yet another revolution." David Jeffries of AllMusic gave the album four out of five stars, saying "The supportive numbers are nearly as strong as the highlights, plus the skits whiz by fast enough, allowing the listener some time to deal with the adrenaline overdose. To easily slide into a different genre is one thing, but to set off fireworks while doing so is something else. Only bad news about this Therapy session is that it's a creative, cathartic blast that ends way too soon."

== Commercial performance ==
The album debuted at number 32 on the Billboard 200 chart, with first-week sales of 10,000 copies in the United States.

== Track listing ==
No.	Title	Writer(s)	Producer(s)	Length
1.	"The Ghost (Therapy #1) (Skit)"			0:08
2.	"Public School" (featuring Krizz Kaliko)	Aaron Yates, Michael Summers, Samuel Watson	Seven	4:05
3.	"Head Now" (featuring Bernz & Wrekonize)	Yates, Benjamin Miller, Bernardo Garcia, Summers, Ross Robinson, Sammy Siegler, Wes Borland	Ross Robinson, Seven (co.)	3:36
4.	"Hiccup"	Yates, Summers, Robinson, Siegler, Borland	Ross Robinson	3:19
5.	"Therapy (Skit)"			0:25
6.	"Shame on Me" (featuring Caroline Dupuy Heerwagen)	Yates, Caroline Dupuy Heerwagen, Summers, Robinson, Siegler	Ross Robinson, Seven (co.)	3:50
7.	"Jacob Wells Message (Skit)"			0:31
8.	"When Demons Come" (featuring Tyler Lyon)	Yates, Korey Lloyd, Summers, Robinson, Tyler Lyon	Ross Robinson, Seven (co.)	2:31
9.	"Therapy Skit Three (Skit)"			0:27
10.	"I.L.L."	Yates, Summers, Robinson	Ross Robinson, Seven (co.)	3:58
11.	"Stop the Sailor"	Yates, Summers, Robinson, Siegler, Borland	Ross Robinson, Seven (co.)	4:22

- (co.) - Co-production

== Personnel ==
- Tech N9ne – vocals
- Alfredo Ortiz – percussion, bongos
- Bernz – guest vocals
- Caroline Dupuy Heerwagen – guest vocals
- DJ Spinstyles – scratches
- Greg Coates – bass guitar
- Korey Lloyd – guitar
- Krizz Kaliko – guest vocals
- Ross Robinson – guest vocals, production
- Sammy Siegler – drums
- Seven – keyboards, production
- Tyler Lyon – guest vocals, guitar, bass guitar and drums
- Wes Borland – guitar (tracks 3, 4, 11), bass guitar (tracks 3, 4)
- Wrekonize – guest vocals

== Charts ==
Chart (2013)	Peak position
US Billboard 200	32
US Top R&B/Hip-Hop Albums (Billboard)	4
US Independent Albums (Billboard)	5
