= Strangeulation =

Studio album by Tech N9ne
- Released: May 6, 2014
- Recorded: 2013–2014
- Genre: Hip-hop
- Length: 60:06
- Label: Strange Music
- Producer: Frizz, Farrell "Rell" Rogers, Scott "The Ninja" Stevens, Seven, Thomas "Tom" Burns

Tech N9ne chronology
Therapy (2013)	Strangeulation (2014)	Special Effects (2015)

Tech N9ne Collabos chronology
Welcome to Strangeland (2011)	Strangeulation (2014)	Strangeulation Vol. II (2015)

Strangeulation is the fourteenth studio album by American rapper Tech N9ne, the fifth in his "Collabos" series. The album was released on May 6, 2014, by Strange Music. The album features guest appearances from the entire Strange Music roster, including its newest signing at the time — Murs, as well as some outside collaborators such as Tyler Lyon, Ryan Bradley, Mackenzie O'Guin, Kendall Morgan, John 5 and Serj Tankian.

== Background ==
In April 2014, in an interview with StupidDope, Tech N9ne spoke about the inspiration behind the title of the album, saying: "Something's always happening in Tech N9ne's life whether it be happy, whether it be sad, whether it be madness. I'm always living it so I'm always writing. The influence behind Strangeulation is off of strangulation you know. Having the industry in a choke-hold after they hear this music. Nobody will be able to say nothing. Just all the way choked up. MURS to MayDay! to Stevie Stone to Ces Cru to Tech N9ne to Krizz Kaliko to Kutt Calhoun to Jay Rock."

== Promotion ==
On April 29, 2014, the music video was released for "Over It" featuring Ryan Bradley. On May 8, 2014, the music video was released for "Strangeulation Cypher". On May 21, 2014, the music video was released for "Hard (A Monster Made It)". On June 25, 2014, the music video was released for "Fear" featuring Mackenzie O'Guin.

== Critical response ==
Professional ratings
Review scores
Source	Rating
AllMusic	3/5 stars
HipHopDX	3/5 stars
RapReviews	7/10
XXL	(L)

Strangeulation was met with generally positive reviews from music critics.

David Jeffries of AllMusic gave the album three out of five stars, saying "It shouldn't be a surprise that rapper Tech N9ne's fifth album of collaborations, and 14th album overall, isn't an easy entry point for newcomers, and with the topic being Tech's "Strangulation" of the music industry, this is certainly one for the Strange Music cheerleaders. All that said, it's a Strange Music posse party that just don't stop, crackling with all the excitement of a mixtape but given that official release polish, which just increases the "boom" factor."

Steven Goldstein of HipHopDX gave the album three out of five stars, saying "Now five albums into the "Collabos" series, it would have been interesting to see Tech N9ne hook up with some of Hip Hop's other independent heavyweights. Tech raps about seeing "me, K. Lamar and Macklemore sharing the same stage," and while the major label aversion is understandable, Strangeulation only has so much upside without expanding beyond Strange Music. An artist so comfortable with cross-genre experimentation and forward-thinking lyricism played it surprisingly safe with the actual "collabos," but Tech's in-house team is more than good enough to keep the project in rotation for dedicated fans."

Eric Diep of XXL gave the album an L rating, saying: "There's a sense of realization on Strangeulation that shows Tech's motivated to become a part of the elite rap league that includes Eminem and Jay Z. With his latest collabo effort before Special Effects (his 15th studio album), Tech is viewed as the big homie among his peers and delivers his best work to allow them to rise to the occasion. This time around, it just seems the Technicians are the only ones listening."

Steve 'Flash' Juon of RapReviews gave the album a seven out of ten, saying "It's a good album, even an above average album, one I'd be happy I bought at the merch table whether I was showing love or not and whether it came with a collector's coin that as much as I like it I feel may get misplaced once I put this CD on the shelf. Tech fans should definitely make the investment, and it's a strong teaser for Murs' official label debut in June."

== Commercial performance ==
The album debuted at number 5 on the Billboard 200 chart, with first-week sales of 36,000 copies in the United States. In its second week, the album dropped to number 33, selling 8,300 copies, bringing its total album sales to 44,000 copies. The album has sold 83,000 copies in the US as of October 2015.

== Track listing ==
No.	Title	Writer(s)	Producer(s)	Length
1.	"Strangeulation I"	Aaron Yates, Michael Summers	Seven	1:50
2.	"Hard (A Monster Made It)" (featuring Murs)	Yates, Summers, Nicholas Carter	Seven	3:57
3.	"Over It" (featuring Ryan Bradley)	Yates, Summers, Manzilla Queen	Seven	4:28
4.	"Make Waves" (featuring Krizz Kaliko, Rittz & Tyler Lyon)	Yates, Summers, Tyler Lyon, Jonathan McCollum, Samuel Watson	Seven	4:55
5.	"Nobody Cares: (The Remix)" (featuring Krizz Kaliko, Stevie Stone, Wrekonize, Bernz & Ces Cru)	Yates, Summers, Watson, Queen, Bernardo "Bernz" Garcia, Donnie King, Benjamin Miller, Mike Viglione, Stephen Williams	Seven	4:59
6.	"Great Night" (featuring Ces Cru)	Yates, Summers, King, Viglione	Seven	3:32
7.	"Red Rags" (featuring Big Scoob, Jay Rock & Kutt Calhoun)	Yates, Summers, Steward Ashby, Melvin Calhoun, Johnny McKinzie	Seven	3:56
8.	"Strangeulation II" (featuring Stevie Stone, Murs, Brotha Lynch Hung & Godemis)	Summers, King, Williams, Carter, Kevin Mann	Seven	3:06
9.	"Which One" (featuring Murs & Godemis)	Yates, Summers, Carter, King	Seven	2:56
10.	"American Horror Story" (featuring Ces Cru)	Yates, Summers, King, Viglione	Seven	4:09
11.	"Fear" (featuring Mackenzie O'Guin)	Yates, Summers, Queen, Watson, Mackenzie O'Guin,	Seven	4:25
12.	"Strangeulation III" (featuring Bernz, Kutt Calhoun, Ubiquitous & Wrekonize)	Summers, Calhoun, Miller, Viglione, Garcia	Seven	3:39
13.	"Na Na" (featuring Stevie Stone & Rittz)	Yates, Summers, McCollum, Williams	Seven	4:08
14.	"Stink" (featuring Krizz Kaliko, Stevie Stone & Kendall Morgan)	Yates, Summers, Watson, Williams, Kendall Morgan, Khris Rickards	Seven	3:59
15.	"The Calling" (featuring Tyler Lyon)	Yates, Summers, Lyon	Seven	4:18
16.	"Strangeulation IV" (featuring Prozak, Big Scoob, Krizz Kaliko & Rittz)	Ashby, McCollum, Summers, Watson Steven Shippy	Seven	3:14
17.	"We Are Free" (featuring Bernz & Wrekonize)	Yates, Summers, Garcia, Miller, Queen, Shalini Perumalla	Seven	4:30
Total length:				60:06

Deluxe edition (bonus tracks)
No.	Title	Writer(s)	Producer(s)	Length
18.	"Sut Mig"	Yates, Jeffrey "Frizz" James, Thomas "Tom" Burns, Farrell "Rell" Rogers	James, Burns, Rogers	3:23
19.	"SOTG Remix Intro"			0:22
20.	"Straight Out the Gate: (The Scott Stevens Remix)" (featuring John 5, Krizz Kaliko & Serj Tankian)	Yates, Serj Tankian, John Lowery, Watson, Scott "The Ninja" Stevens, Summers	Seven, Stevens	3:44
21.	"Withdrawal" (featuring Krizz Kaliko)	Yates, Watson, Summers	Seven	3:58

Strange Music Online Pre-Order Digital Bonus Track
No.	Title	Producer(s)	Length
22.	"Nobody Cares" (featuring Krizz Kaliko & Stevie Stone)	Seven	4:11

== Personnel ==
- Aaron Bean – street marketing, promotions
- Anthony Devera – additional vocals
- Ben Cybulsky – acoustic guitar, bass guitarengineering, guitar, mixing
- Ben Grossi – project consultant, general management
- Bernz – featured performer
- Big Scoob – featured performer
- Braxton Flemming – merchandising
- Brent Bradley – internet marketing
- Brian Shafton – project consultant, general management
- Brotha Lynch Hung – featured performer
- Chris Handley – bass, guitar
- Cory Nielsen – production assistant
- Crystal Watson – additional vocals
- Dave Weiner – associate producer
- Dawn O'Guin – production assistant
- DJ Fresh – scratching
- Glenda Cowan – production assistant
- Go-Go Ray – drums
- Godemis – featured performer
- James Cerven – additional vocals
- Jared Coop – merchandising
- Jay Rock – featured performer
- Jeff Nelson – internet marketing
- Jose Ramirez – street marketing & promotions
- Kendall Morgan – featured performer
- Kerry Rounds – additional vocals
- Khris Rickards – writer
- Korey Lloyd – production assistant, project management
- Krizz Kaliko – featured performer
- Kutt Calhoun – featured performer
- Liquid 9 – art direction & design
- Mackenzie O'Guin – featured performer
- Manzilla Marquis Queen – writer
- Mary Harris – merchandising
- Matt Steele – additional vocals
- Michael Hollembeak – additional vocals
- Murs – featured performer
- Penny Ervin – merchandising
- Prozak – featured performer
- Richie Abbott – publicity
- Rittz – featured performer
- Robert Lieberman – legal management
- Ryan Bradley – featured performer
- Ryan Lindberg – additional vocals
- Samantha Levi – photography
- Sarah Romero – additional vocals
- Seven – producer
- Shalini Perumalla – additional vocals, writer
- Taylor Lamb – additional vocals
- Tech N9ne – primary artist, A&R
- Tom Baker – mastering
- Travis O'Guin – A&R, executive producer, skit
- Tyler Lyon – drums, featured performer, guitar, vocals
- Ubiquitous – featured performer
- Valdora Case – production assistant
- Victor Sandoval – internet marketing
- Violet Brown – production assistant
- Wrekonize – featured performer

== Charts ==
=== Weekly charts ===
Chart (2014)	Peak position
US Billboard 200	5
US Top R&B/Hip-Hop Albums (Billboard)	1
US Top Rap Albums (Billboard)	1
US Independent Albums (Billboard)	1

=== Year-end charts ===
Chart (2014)	Position
US Top R&B/Hip-Hop Albums (Billboard)	52
