= Strangeulation Vol. II =

Studio album by Tech N9ne
- Released: November 20, 2015
- Recorded: 2015
- Genre: Hip-hop
- Length: 70:41
- Label: Strange Music
- Producer: Seven

Tech N9ne chronology
Special Effects (2015)	Strangeulation Vol. II (2015)	The Storm (2016)

Tech N9ne Collabos chronology
Strangeulation (2014)	Strangeulation Vol. II (2015)	Dominion (2017)

Strangeulation Vol. II is the sixteenth studio album by American rapper Tech N9ne, the sixth in his "Collabos" series. The album was released on November 20, 2015, by Strange Music. It features the entire Strange Music roster, including their new signees JL B.Hood, Darrein Safron, and Mackenzie Nicole. The album serves as a sequel to Strangeulation, the previous Tech N9ne Collabos album.

Professional ratings
Review scores
Source	Rating
AllMusic	3.5/5 stars

== Commercial performance ==
On the chart dated December 12, 2015, Strangeulation Vol. II debuted on the US Billboard 200 chart at number 25, powered by first week sales 23,969 equivalent album units; it sold 22,380 copies in its first week, with the remainder of its unit total reflecting the album's streaming activity and track sales. It became Tech N9ne's second album to chart at number one on the Billboard Independent Albums in 2015. The album has sold 50,000 copies in the US as of November 2016.

== Track listing ==
- All tracks were produced solely by Seven except for "Torrid", which was co-produced by Tyler Lyon.

No.	Title	Writer(s)	Length
1.	"Strangeulation Vol. II Cypher I"	Aaron D. Yates; Michael Summers	2:52
2.	"PBSA" (featuring CES Cru)	Yates; Mike Viglione; Donnie King; Summers	4:25
3.	"Push Start" (featuring Big Scoob)	Yates; Stewart D. Ashby; Summers; Manzilla Marquis Queen	3:05
4.	"Slow to Me" (featuring Krizz Kaliko and Rittz)	Yates; Samuel Watson; Jonathan McCollum; Summers	4:40
5.	"Strangeulation Vol. II Cypher II" (featuring Stevie Stone and CES Cru)	Yates; Viglione; King; Summers; Stephen Williams	4:03
6.	"MMM"	Yates; Summers	3:54
7.	"Intruders" (skit)	Yates	1:04
8.	"Tell Me If I'm Trippin'" (featuring Brotha Lynch Hung, Prozak and Tyler Lyon)	Yates; Steven T. Shippy; Summers; Kevin Mann; Tyler Lyon	4:34
9.	"We Just Wanna Party" (featuring Rittz and Darrein Safron)	Yates; McCollum; Darrein Safron; Adrian Ra'mon Smith	4:01
10.	"Strangeulation Vol. II Cypher III" (featuring Big Scoob and JL B. Hood)	Yates; Ashby; Summers; Jason Varnes	2:38
11.	"Fired" (featuring Stevie Stone and Darrein Safron)	Yates; Safron; Summer; Williams	4:07
12.	"Real with Yourself" (Darrein Safron featuring Tech N9ne)	Safron; Yates; Summers	4:12
13.	"Chilly Rub" (featuring Stevie Stone and Godemis)	Yates; King; Summers; Williams	4:18
14.	"Strangeulation Vol. II Cypher IV" (featuring Krizz Kaliko, Rittz and Prozak)	Yates; Watson; McCollum; Shippy; Summers	3:15
15.	"Wake and Bake" (featuring Krizz Kaliko and ¡MAYDAY!)	Yates; Watson; Summers; Benjamin Miller; Bernardo Garcia; Gianni Perocarpi	3:57
16.	"Message to Murs" (skit)		0:46
17.	"Blunt and a Ho" (featuring Murs and Ubiquitous)	Yates; Nicholas Carter; Viglione; Summers	3:12
18.	"Strangeulation Vol. II Cypher V" (featuring Murs, Wrekonize and Bernz)	Yates; Carter; Summers; Miller; Garcia	2:54
19.	"Actin' Like You Know" (Mackenzie O'Guin featuring Tech N9ne)	Mackenzie O'Guin; Yates; Summers	4:09
20.	"Torrid"	Yates; Summers; Lyon	4:35
Total length:			1:10:41

Deluxe edition
No.	Title	Length
1.	"Praise KOD" (featuring Ryan Bradley) (Bonus Track)	4:36
2.	"Strangeulation Vol. II Cypher I"	2:52
3.	"PBSA" (featuring CES Cru)	4:25
4.	"Push Start" (featuring Big Scoob)	3:05
5.	"Slow to Me" (featuring Krizz Kaliko and Rittz)	4:40
6.	"Strangeulation Vol. II Cypher II" (featuring CES Cru and Stevie Stone)	4:03
7.	"MMM (Michael Myers Mask)"	3:54
8.	"Intruders" (skit)	1:04
9.	"Tell Me If I’m Trippin" (featuring Prozak, Brotha Lynch Hung and Tyler Lyon)	4:34
10.	"We Just Wanna Party" (featuring Rittz, and Darrein Safron)	4:01
11.	"Muah" (featuring Krizz Kaliko) (Bonus Track)	3:29
12.	"Strangeulation Vol. II Cypher III" (featuring Big Scoob and JL B.Hood)	2:38
13.	"Fired" (featuring Stevie Stone and Darrein Safron)	4:07
14.	"Real With Yourself" (Darrein Safron featuring Tech N9ne)	4:12
15.	"Chilly Rub" (featuring Stevie Stone and Godemis)	4:18
16.	"Strangeulation Vol. II Cypher IV" (featuring Krizz Kaliko, Rittz and Prozak)	3:15
17.	"Wake and Bake" (featuring Krizz Kaliko and ¡MAYDAY!)	3:57
18.	"Message to Murs" (skit)	0:46
19.	"Blunt and a Ho" (featuring Murs and Ubiquitous)	3:12
20.	"Strangeulation Vol. II Cypher V" (featuring Murs, Wrekonize and Bernz)	2:54
21.	"Actin Like You Know" (Mackenzie O'Guin featuring Tech N9ne)	4:09
22.	"Torrid" (featuring Tyler Lyon)	4:32
23.	"Strange" (Outro)	1:02
Total length:		1:19:45

Notes

- Track listing and credits from album booklet.
- "Intruders" (skit) features additional vocals by Lauren Robson
- "Tell Me If I'm Trippin'" features additional vocals by Flip, Mary Harris and Prozak
- "Chilly Rub" features additional vocals by Kelsee Pietz
- "Strangeulation Vol. II Cypher IV" features additional vocals by Kelsee Pietz and Skyler Brown
- "Wake and Bake features additional vocals by Gianni Ca$h

== Personnel ==
Credits for Strangeulation Vol. II adapted from the album liner notes.

- Richie Abbott – publicity
- Erich Azbill – street marketing & promotions
- Tom Baker – mixing
- Big Scoob – featured artist
- Brent Bradley – internet marketing
- Skyler Brown – additional vocals
- Violet Brown – production assistant
- Valdora Case – production assistant
- Jared Coop – merchandising
- Glenda Cowan – production assistant
- Ben "Bengineer" Cybulsky – engineer, mixing
- Dr. James "Strangelove" D'Angelo – Strange physician
- Penny Ervin – merchandising
- Braxton Flemming – merchandising
- Flip – additional vocals
- Godemis – featured artist
- Mary Harris – additional vocals, merchandising
- JL B. Hood – featured artist
- Krizz Kaliko – featured artist
- Samantha Levi – photographer
- Robert Lieberman – legal
- Liquid 9 – art direction & design
- Korey Lloyd – production assistant, project management
- Tyler Lyon – guitar, bass guitar, featured artist
- Bob McDowell – merchandising
- Murs – engineer, featured artist
- Jeff Nelson – internet marketing
- Cory Nielsen – production assistant
- NonMS – percussion
- Dawn O'Guin – production assistant
- Mackenzie O'Guin – featured artist
- Travis O'Guin – A&R, executive producer
- Lucas Parker – guitar
- David Pastorious – bass guitar
- Kelsee Pietz – additional vocals
- Eric Reid – engineer
- Mark Reifsteck – booking
- Rittz – featured artist
- Lauren Robson – additional vocals
- Kerry Rounds – additional vocals
- Darrein Safron – featured artist
- Victor Sandoval – internet marketing
- Seven – musical producer, associate producer
- Brian Shafton – project consultant, general management
- Dale Smith – merchandising
- Stevie Stone – featured artist
- Tech N9ne – A&R, primary artist
- Kaitlyn Toepperwein – street marketing & promotions
- Sean Tyler – production assistant
- Ubiquitous – featured artist
- Taylor Via – street marketing & promotions
- Jan Wainwright – production assistant
- Alien Warr – drums
- Lauren Watkins – internet marketing
- Daniel Watson – engineer
- Dave Weiner – associate producer

== Charts ==
=== Weekly charts ===
Chart (2015)	Peak position
US Billboard 200	25
US Independent Albums (Billboard)	1
US Top R&B/Hip-Hop Albums (Billboard)	4

=== Year-end charts ===
Chart (2016)	Position
US Top R&B/Hip-Hop Albums (Billboard)	79
