= Make a Living (disambiguation) =

Make a Living is a 1931 French comedy film.

Make a Living may also refer to:

- "Make a Living", a 2008 song by Point Blank from Point Blank (2008 album)
- "Make a Living", a 2010 song by ¡Mayday! on the album Stuck on an Island
- "Make a Living", a 2015 song by Philthy Rich and Iamsu!

== See also ==
- Job (role)
- Living (disambiguation)
