= Take Me to Your Leader (¡Mayday! album) =

Studio album by ¡Mayday!
- Released: March 26, 2012
- Recorded: 2011–2012
- Genre: Hip-hop; rap rock; alternative rock; alternative hip-hop
- Length: 69:00
- Label: Strange
- Producer: ¡Mayday!

¡Mayday! chronology
Stuck on an Island (2010)	Take Me to Your Leader (2012)	Believers (2013)

Professional ratings
Review scores
Source	Rating
HipHopDX	4/5 stars
Dj Booth	4/5 stars

Take Me To Your Leader is the third studio album by ¡Mayday!, and debut album on Tech N9ne and Travis O'Guin's record label Strange Music. The album was released on March 26, 2012, after being pushed forward a day from March 27. An instrumental version of the album was later released on January 29, 2013, entitled Take Me To Your Speakers.

== Background ==
¡Mayday! signed to Strange Music in April 2011. Take Me To Your Leader was announced in late 2011 after ¡Mayday! appeared on 3 tracks of Tech N9ne's Welcome to Strangeland: "The Noose", "Retrogression" and "EMJ (Emotional Musical Journey)".

== Reception ==
Travis O'Guin, CEO of Strange Music, considers the album to be the best work ever released on the label, going on to say he only felt this way before about Tech N9ne's Anghellic. HipHopDX gave the album 4 stars out of 5, describing it as "an extremely well-written album that actually means something".

== Track listing ==
No.	Title	Producer(s)	Length
1.	"Badlands" (featuring Tech N9ne)	Plex Luthor	4:39
2.	"Death March"	Plex Luthor; Gianni Cash	3:22
3.	"Roaches"	Plex Luthor	3:28
4.	"Highs & Lows" (featuring Ace Hood)	Plex Luthor	3:43
5.	"R.E.M."	Plex Luthor; Gianni Cash	3:34
6.	"Lando's Jam"	Plex Luthor; Gianni Cash	2:47
7.	"Due In June"	Plex Luthor	3:01
8.	"Dig It Out"	Plex Luthor	4:08
9.	"Imprint" (featuring Jovi Rockwell)	Plex Luthor; Wrekonize	3:44
10.	"TNT" (featuring Dead Prez)	Plex Luthor	4:45
11.	"Hardcore Bitches" (featuring Murs)	Plex Luthor; Gianni Cash	3:49
12.	"Last Days" (featuring Krizz Kaliko)	Wrekonize; Plex Luthor	3:23
13.	"Everything's Everything"	Plex Luthor; Gianni Cash	4:39
14.	"Devil On My Mind" (featuring Liz Suwandi)	Gianni Cash; Plex Luthor	2:50
15.	"20/20"	Gianni Cash	3:56
16.	"Keep Em On"	Plex Luthor; Bernz	4:09
17.	"Take Me To Your Leader"	Plex Luthor; Gianni Cash	3:05
18.	"June"	Plex Luthor; Gianni Cash	3:02
19.	"Last Minute Trip"	Plex Luthor; Gianni Cash	2:56
Total length:			69:00

Strange Music Pre-Order Digital Bonus Track
No.	Title	Producer(s)	Length
20.	"Who You Know"	¡Mayday!	2:42

== Charts ==
Chart (2012)	Peak position
US Billboard 200	92
US Independent Albums (Billboard)	18
US Top R&B/Hip-Hop Albums (Billboard)	18
US Top Rap Albums (Billboard)	15
