= Welcome to Strangeland =

Studio album by Tech N9ne
- Released: November 8, 2011
- Recorded: 2011
- Genre: Hip-hop
- Length: 1:05:40
- Label: Strange Music
- Producers: Beats 4 Days LLC; David Sanders II; Jomeezius The Genius; Plex Luthor; Seven

Tech N9ne chronology
All 6's and 7's (2011)	Welcome to Strangeland (2011)	Something Else (2013)

Tech N9ne Collabos chronology
The Gates Mixed Plate (2010)	Welcome to Strangeland (2011)	Strangeulation (2014)

Singles from Welcome to Strangeland
- 1. "The Noose" Released: October 13, 2011

Professional ratings
Review scores
Source	Rating
AllMusic	3/5 stars
HipHopDX	4/5
RapReviews	7.5/10

Welcome to Strangeland is the twelfth studio album by American rapper Tech N9ne and the fourth installment in his "Collabos" series. It was released on the rapper's 40th birthday, on November 8, 2011, through Strange Music. Production was handled by Michael "Seven" Summers, Jomeezius The Genius, Plex Luthor, Beats 4 Days LLC and David Sanders II. It features contributions from 816 Boyz, ¡Mayday!, Brotha Lynch Hung, Jay Rock, Stevie Stone, Ces Cru, Courtney Kuhnz, Jay Da 3rd, Prozak, Young Bleed, Irv Da Phenom, Liz Suwandi and Magnum PI.

In the United States, the album debuted at number 21 on the Billboard 200, number 4 on both the Top R&B/Hip-Hop Albums and the Independent Albums, and number 3 on the Top Rap Albums charts, with 26,000 copies sold in its first week.

== Background ==
In April 2011, Tech N9ne spoke about the album in an interview with 411mania.com, saying that the album would strictly feature everyone on the Strange Music label, only expanding to closely affiliated artists such as Irv Da Phenom and Ces Cru. Then in August 2011, Tech announced through Twitter that he was about to begin work on Strangeland and that producers would include Seven, Jomeezius The Genius, David Sanders II and ¡Mayday!. He also said that the album would most likely feature 18 tracks.

On August 11, 2011, Tech N9ne posted an image on Twitter revealing a track called "Kocky" and featuring Kutt Calhoun and Jay Rock. On August 31, 2011, it was confirmed through a blog post that the album would be titled "Welcome to Strangeland" and that the release date was scheduled for November 8, 2011.

It was also confirmed that there would be a collaboration between Tech and Prozak, who is a current member of Strange Music and collaborated with Tech on 2009's K.O.D.

The album was made available for pre-order from Strange Music's online store on September 9, 2011. The cover was revealed with the pre-order. When pre-ordered, the album came with a download of "Beautiful Music". It also confirmed several features on the album including Stevie Stone, ¡Mayday!, Brotha Lynch Hung, Young Bleed, Krizz Kaliko and Kutt Calhoun.

On September 14, 2011, Tech mentioned on Twitter a collaboration between Prozak and Brotha Lynch Hung on a track called "My Favorite" as well as a song with Young Bleed titled "Come Dirty". He also confirmed earlier in the day that he had completed recording music for the album.

In an interview with Jomeezius The Genius, he confirmed that he produced a total of 6 tracks for the album and that 4 of them will definitely be on it.

On October 13, Tech released the song "The Noose" featuring ¡Mayday!. Then on October 24, he released the song "Unfair". A Behind the Scenes film was also released on October 24 for the music video "Who Do I Catch". Several days later, Tech premiered the track "Slave".

The tracklist was revealed on October 19.

The first music video for the album, "Who Do I Catch" which was directed by Dan Gedman of Liquid 9, premiered on XXL magazine's website on November 5, 2011.

A deluxe edition of the album was made available from Best Buy that contained 3 bonus tracks ("I Need A Drink", "The Real Thing" and "EMJ") and a new Strangeland pendant. A deluxe edition was also made available through iTunes Store which contained the three bonus tracks available from Best Buy, and an additional bonus track ("Road Rage").

== Track listing ==
No.	Title	Writer(s)	Producer(s)	Length
1.	"Stars"	Aaron D. Yates; Samuel Watson; Michael Summers	Seven	3:45
2.	"Welcome to Strangeland" (featuring Krizz Kaliko)	Yates; Watson; Jomar Dogué	Jomeezius The Genius	2:58
3.	"Unfair" (featuring Krizz Kaliko and Ces Cru)	Yates; Watson; Mike S. Viglione; Donnie H. King; Summers	Seven	5:14
4.	"Kocky" (featuring Kutt Calhoun and Jay Rock)	Yates; Melvin Calhoun Jr.; Johnny McKinzie; Watson; David Sanders II	David Sanders II	4:14
5.	"Who Do I Catch"	Yates; Summers	Seven	4:17
6.	"My Favorite" (featuring Prozak and Brotha Lynch Hung)	Yates; Steven T. Shippy; Kevin Mann; Watson; Dogué	Jomeezius The Genius	4:19
7.	"Retrogression" (featuring ¡Mayday!)	Yates; Bernardo Garcia; Benjamin Miller; Aaron Eckhart	Plex Luthor	4:13
8.	"Bang Out" (performed by 816 Boyz)	Yates; Calhoun Jr.; Watson; Manzilla Marquis Queen; Summers	Seven	4:39
9.	"Beautiful Music"	Yates; Watson; Dogué	Jomeezius The Genius	4:12
10.	"Won't You Come Dirty" (featuring Young Bleed and Stevie Stone)	Yates; Glenn R. Clifton Jr.; Stephen Williams; Watson; Dogué	Jomeezius The Genius	3:47
11.	"Sad Circus" (featuring Brotha Lynch Hung and Courtney Kuhnz)	Yates; Mann; Summers	Seven	3:47
12.	"The Noose" (featuring ¡Mayday!)	Yates; Garcia; Miller; Eckhart	Plex Luthor	4:58
13.	"Slave" (featuring Krizz Kaliko and Kutt Calhoun)	Yates; Watson; Calhoun Jr.; Summers	Seven	4:34
14.	"Overwhelming" (featuring Jay Da 3rd)	Yates; Joe Foutain; Steven Brown	Beats 4 Days LLC	5:41
15.	"Gods" (featuring Krizz Kaliko and Kutt Calhoun)	Yates; Watson; Calhoun Jr.; Summers	Seven	5:02
Total length:				1:05:40

Best Buy bonus tracks
No.	Title	Writer(s)	Producer(s)	Length
16.	"I Need a Drink"	Yates; Summers	Seven
17.	"The Real Thing" (featuring Liz Suwandi)	Yates; Elizabeth Arnold; Summers	Seven
18.	"EMJ" (featuring Irv Da Phenom, Kutt Calhoun, Bernz, Wrekonize, Stevie Stone, Jay Rock and Magnum PI)	Yates; Mitchell Irving Jr.; Calhoun Jr.; Garcia; Miller; Williams; McKinzie; King Harris; Watson; Summers	Seven

iTunes bonus track
No.	Title	Writer(s)	Producer(s)	Length
19.	"Road Rage" (featuring Irv Da Phenom)	Yates; Irving Jr.; Summers	Seven	3:01

== Personnel ==
- Aaron "Tech N9NE" Yates – lead vocals, A&R
- Samuel "Krizz Kaliko" Watson – additional vocals (tracks: 1–4, 6, 8–10, 13–15, 18)
- Jerita Streater – additional vocals (track 1)
- Mike "Ubiquitous" Viglione – additional vocals (track 3)
- Donnie "Godemis" King – additional vocals (track 3)
- Melvin "Kutt Calhoun" Calhoun Jr. – additional vocals (tracks: 4, 8, 13, 15, 18)
- Johnny "Jay Rock" McKinzie – additional vocals (tracks: 4, 18)
- Liz Suwandi – additional vocals (tracks: 5, 17)
- Courtney Kuhnz – additional vocals (tracks: 5, 11)
- Steven "Prozak" Shippy – additional vocals (track 6)
- Kevin "Brotha Lynch Hung" Mann – additional vocals (tracks: 6, 11)
- Bernardo "Bernz" Garcia – additional vocals (tracks: 7, 12, 18)
- Benjamin "Wrekonize" Miller – additional vocals (tracks: 7, 12, 18)
- Manzilla Marquis "Makzilla" Queen – additional vocals (track 8)
- Anita Hilanthan – additional vocals (track 8)
- Glenn "Young Bleed" Clifton Jr. – additional vocals (track 11)
- Stephen "Stevie Stone" Williams – additional vocals (tracks: 11, 18)
- Joe "Jay Da 3rd" Foutain – additional vocals (track 14)
- Steven Brown – additional vocals (track 14)
- Cherelle Smith – additional vocals (track 14)
- Barbara Word – additional vocals (track 15)
- April Watson – additional vocals (track 15)
- Crystal Watson – additional vocals (track 15)
- Mitchell "Irv Da Phenom" Irving Jr. – additional vocals (track 18)
- King "Magnum PI" Harris – additional vocals (track 18)
- OG Mugs – additional vocals (track 18)
- Cross Eyed Joe – additional vocals (track 18)
- Jose Ramirez – additional vocals (track 18)
- Brian "Scenario" Fraser – additional vocals (track 18)
- Lil Rae – additional vocals (track 18)
- Michael "Seven" Summers – producer (tracks: 1, 3, 5, 8, 11, 13, 15–19)
- Jomar "Jomeezius The Genius" Dogué – producer (tracks: 2, 6, 9, 10)
- David Sanders II – producer (track 4)
- Aaron "Plex Luthor" Eckhart – producer (tracks: 7, 12)
- Beats 4 Days LLC – producer (track 14)
- Ben Cybulsky – mixing
- Tom Baker – mastering
- Travis O'Guin – executive producer, A&R, marketing

== Charts ==
Chart (2011)	Peak position
US Billboard 200	21
US Top R&B/Hip-Hop Albums (Billboard)	4
US Top Rap Albums (Billboard)	3
US Independent Albums (Billboard)	4
