= Future Vintage =

Studio album by ¡Mayday!
- Released: September 18, 2015
- Recorded: 2015
- Genre: Hip-hop; rap rock
- Length: 78:27
- Label: Strange
- Producer: ¡Mayday!; The Pushers; Seven; Beatnik; K-Salaam; Gianni Ca$h; Bernz; DJ Fuse; Plex Luthor; Will Roberts

¡Mayday! chronology
¡MursDay! (2013)	Future Vintage (2015)	Search Party (2017)

Singles from Future Vintage
- 1. "Fuel to the Fire" Released: July 14, 2015; 2. "Ten Thirty Three" Released: July 28, 2015; 3. "Something In The Air" Released: August 26, 2015; 4. "Against My Better Judgement" Released: September 9, 2015

Future Vintage is the fifth studio album by American hip-hop group ¡Mayday!. Pre-release, Wrekonize illustrated that "This album sums up everywhere we've been and is a link between everything we've done and where we're trying to go." The album was released on September 18, 2015, by Strange Music.

== Singles ==
The first single for Future Vintage, "Fuel To The Fire" was released on July 14, 2015. Two weeks later, on July 28, 2015, the second single "Ten Thirty Three" was released. Just under a month later, on August 26, 2015, "Something In The Air" was released. The final single released before the album was "Against My Better Judgement" on September 9, 2015.

== Reception ==
The album received generally positive reviews and charted on the US Billboard 200 with a peak position of 112. David Jeffries from AllMusic gave Future Vintage a 4 out of 5 stars and stated that "Broken hearts, bad vibes, and slow ballads are all over Future/Vintage, but as ¡Mayday! grow older, they prove they're capable of tackling these topics and tones while maintaining the power and the punch of their early days." Andrew Buckner of Swurv Radio reviewed the album and expressed that "It all comes together to equate both a mammoth achievement and a certified masterpiece." In a sum up of 2015 Hip-Hop, Cassidy Kakin of TeamBackpack praised Future Vintage and asserted that it "helped define 2015 hip-hop, and it offers a recipe for a way forward."

== Track listing ==
No.	Title	Producer(s)	Length
1.	"Jettison"	Gianni Ca$h	4:58
2.	"Fuel To The Fire"	¡Mayday!	4:24
3.	"Can't Take It With You"	¡Mayday!	3:30
4.	"Won't Wait"	¡Mayday!; The Pushers	4:06
5.	"Coast"	¡Mayday!	4:57
6.	"Dive" (featuring Stevie Stone)	Seven	3:20
7.	"Something In The Air" (featuring Femi Kuti)	Beatnik; K-Salaam	4:04
8.	"Space Cadet"	Gianni Ca$h	4:50
9.	"Into The Night"	Gianni Ca$h	4:43
10.	"Stay Away From You" (featuring Ryan "Myagi" Evans)	Bernz	3:41
11.	"All The Time"	The Pushers; DJ Fuse	4:14
12.	"Ten Thirty Three"	¡Mayday!; The Pushers	3:55
13.	"Antenna"	Gianni Ca$h	3:59
14.	"One Wing" (featuring Ces Cru)	Seven	4:57
15.	"Know It" (featuring Tech N9ne and Stige)	Gianni Ca$h	4:54
16.	"Brother"	Plex Luthor; Gianni Ca$h	3:23
17.	"Against My Better Judgment"	Beatnik; K-Salaam	4:55
18.	"The Sun Will Rise (Skit)"	Bernz; Will Roberts	0:38
19.	"The Last Sunrise"	Gianni Ca$h	4:59
Total length:			78:27

Strange Music pre-order track
No.	Title	Length
20.	"Blue Soul" (featuring Murs)	4:09
Total length:		82:36

== Charts ==
Chart (2015)	Peak position
US Billboard 200	112
US Top R&B/Hip-Hop Albums (Billboard)	9
US Independent Albums (Billboard)	16
