= Something Else (Tech N9ne album) =

Studio album by Tech N9ne
- Released: July 30, 2013
- Studio: ¡Mayday! (Miami); Insane Asylum (San Diego); Product Entertainment (Fort Worth)
- Genre: Hip-hop
- Length: 65:44
- Label: Strange; RBC; INgrooves
- Producer: ¡Mayday!; Ben Cybulsky; Daniel "Keys" Perez; Drumma Boy; Jonathan Pakfar; Ralfy "FAFA" Valencia; Scoop DeVille; Seven; Shane Eli Abrahams; Young Fyre

Tech N9ne chronology
Boiling Point (2012)	Something Else (2013)	Therapy (2013)

Deluxe edition cover

Singles from Something Else
- 1. "So Dope (They Wanna)" Released: July 2, 2013; 2. "Fragile" Released: July 17, 2013

Something Else is the thirteenth studio album by American rapper Tech N9ne. It was released on July 30, 2013, by Strange Music, RBC Records and INgrooves. The album has broken up into three portions – Earth, Water & Fire. Production on the album was handled during 2012 to 2013, primarily by frequent collaborator Seven, among others such as Young Fyre, Drumma Boy, and Fredwreck. The album features guest appearances from B.o.B, Big K.R.I.T., CeeLo Green, The Doors, The Game, Kendrick Lamar, Serj Tankian, T-Pain, Trae tha Truth, and Wiz Khalifa, among others including several artists from Tech N9ne's Strange Music imprint.

Something Else was supported by two singles, "So Dope (They Wanna)" and "Fragile". The album received widespread acclaim from critics. Also faring well commercially, the album sold 58,300 copies in its first week of sale, and debuting at number four on the US Billboard 200.

== Background ==
On February 8, 2013, the album was first announced on the Strange Music blog. During the preview on the Strange Music blog, Tech N9ne spoke about what to expect from the album, saying:

The beats sound nothing like anything you've ever heard me on. The features that I'm going for are something you would never imagine. All I can say about it now is that it's a very human album. What I mean by that is that it's contradictory. On one song I say, 'The saint is ours', like we're in the saint's corner and then I have another song called 'I'm Not A Saint'. It's so beautiful because the King, the Clown, and the G are still present on this album. There's [sic] no apologies in what I'm saying. I don't mind that it contradicts itself because that's what people do. The album is everywhere. It feels like it's Hell, Purgatory and Heaven all over again. I'm telling stories that I've never told – that I was afraid to tell on some songs. It's super personal and I've got a big chip on my shoulder again. It's always been there, but it's getting bigger having to prove to fans and critics that we ain't goin' nowhere.

— Tech N9ne

In March 2013, during an interview with The Arizona Daily Wildcat, Tech N9ne revealed the album has divided into three separate parts titled Fire, Water and Earth. The "Fire" section is a darker within the themes while the "Earth" section was shorter and has heavenly themes, similar to Tech's earlier album Anghellic. Tracks 2–10 are the Fire part, 11–13 the Water part and 14–24 the Earth section.

== Recording and production ==
During the album's recording process, Tech N9ne worked with several of his Strange Music label mates including Big Scoob, Ces Cru, Krizz Kaliko, ¡Mayday!, Rittz and Stevie Stone. He also worked with various other collaborators, such as B.o.B, Big K.R.I.T., CeeLo Green, The Game, Info Gates, Red Café, Serj Tankian, T-Pain, The Doors and Trae tha Truth. While speaking with The Spokesman-Review about the album, when he has noted for the fact that he has been working with both Citizen Cope and Macklemore, but neither appeared on the album. Tech attempted to get Corey Taylor to record vocals for "Love 2 Dislike Me", however, Corey was unable to commit due to the timing because of personal reasons. Tech has given a consideration of trying to get James Hetfield to appear on the song.

In June 2013, the track listing revealed guest appearances on the album from Krizz Kaliko, Serj Tankian, T-Pain, Big Scoob, Red Café, Trae tha Truth, Liz Suwandi, Tyler Lyon, Kendall Morgan, Kendrick Lamar, ¡Mayday!, Angel Davenport, Game, Snow Tha Product, Twisted Insane, Wrekonize, B.o.B, Wiz Khalifa, Big K.R.I.T., CeeLo Green, Kutt Calhoun, Scoop DeVille, Rittz, Stevie Stone, Ces Cru, Danny Brown and The Doors. In April 2013, Tech N9ne spoke on why some artists and collaborations cannot make the cut, saying: "I write music on an impulse; I write it as I feel it. If I was just writing bullshit songs trying to make a hit, yeah, I could give you a song six months in advance. Nigga, I'm doing my album in a month's time. I'm writing it...recording it, going to write another one, really feeling the music for some months and then go in the studio for like a month and a half and do it. Everybody don't work like that."

In July 2013, Tech elaborated further on how the quick schedule for his albums kept him from securing features he wanted on the album. In a Q&A session hosted by Angela Yee during the album's official release party, Tech spoke on his intentions to have both Nas and Jay-Z on the album. Nas was initially sent the song "Burn the World", however, the rapper found the track too personal and requested Tech send him something else. Tech then had his producer, Seven, create a beat he called "The Rise & Fall of Y'all" which he intended to send to Nas but was unable due to timing. He also spoke on how he contacted producer Mike Dean, who at the time was engineering Watch The Throne 2, in an attempt to secure a Jay-Z verse for "That's My Kid", and while Dean had agreed to get Jay to listen to it, Tech ran out of time before having to put the album together. Producers on this album including Drumma Boy, Fredwreck, ¡Mayday!, Scoop DeVille, Michael "Seven" Summers and Young Fyre.

== Release and promotion ==
On March 14, 2013, Strange Music released The Independent Powerhouse Sampler, where it featured snippets of songs from the album titled "Fortune Force Field", "So Dope", "Thizzles", "Meant To Happen", "Dwamn" and the album's first promotional single "B.I.T.C.H." featuring T-Pain. On July 2, 2013, "So Dope (They Wanna)" featuring Snow Tha Product, Twisted Insane and Wrekonize was released as the album's first single along with the pre-order of the album on iTunes. The song was described as being in the same vein of N9ne's previous song "Worldwide Choppers". On July 25, 2013, the music video for "So Dope (They Wanna)" featuring Snow tha Product, Twisted Insane and Wrekonize, was released.

On July 17, 2013, the Kendrick Lamar, Kendall Morgan and ¡Mayday! featuring song "Fragile", was released as the album's second single. On August 1, 2013, the music video was released for "Straight Out The Gate" featuring Serj Tankian. On August 6, 2013, the music video was released for "B.I.T.C.H." featuring T-Pain. On August 14, 2013, the music video was released for "Party The Pain Away" featuring Liz Suwandi. On August 29, 2013, the music video was released for "Love 2 Dislike Me" featuring Liz Suwandi and Tyler Lyon. On September 12, 2013, the music video was released for "Dwamn". On February 9, 2014, the music video was released for "Fragile" featuring Kendrick Lamar, ¡Mayday! and Kendall Morgan.

On March 27, 2013, the official album covers were revealed. In May 2013, Amazon revealed that the release date of the album would be pushed back from June 25, 2013, until July 30, 2013. On June 4, 2013, the album was released for pre-order on the Strange Music website, in three different variants including a standard, deluxe, and a vinyl version. All three come with two tracks; "Fortune Force Field", and "Party the Pain Away". The deluxe version will include an autographed copy of the CD (If pre-ordered), three bonus tracks, and a bonus DVD.

== Critical reception ==
Professional ratings
Aggregate scores
Source	Rating
Metacritic	85/100
Review scores
Source	Rating
AllMusic	4/5 stars
Artistdirect	5/5 stars
Exclaim!	8/10
HipHopDX	4.0/5
RapReviews	8/10
USA Today	3.5/4 stars
XXL	4/5

Something Else was met with widespread critical acclaim. At Metacritic, which assigns a normalized rating out of 100 to reviews from professional publications, the album received an average score of 85, based on five reviews.

David Jeffries of AllMusic said, "Building on the pop and polish of his 2011 release All 6's and 7's, this 2013 effort from Tech N9ne finds the angry and angsty rapper bringing back some of the horror show rap of his early days, which is good, because now his nightmares are not only vivid, but incredibly well-funded." Arasia Graham of HipHopDX said, "Something Else in all of its intense, loud, confusing and obnoxious glory is fluid in its musical movement and sincere in its content. The album is contradictory in subject matter and sound yet speaks to the idealistic and free flowing approach Tech takes when creating music. Tech N9ne sounds sharp over complicated production that has many layers to peel back. And he took big risks that will pay off, as Something Else will surely be a contender for album of the year. There are a few holes—the project's length and forgettable appearances (Wiz Khalifa on "See Me")—but overall, it's an incredible album that will keep that hint of burgundy in the sky." Erin Lowers of Exclaim! said, "While 18 full tracks is a bold move, it's not the best. Songs like "Dwamn", "Strange 2013" and "Meant to Happen" fall by the wayside, and ultimately break the record's power. Nevertheless, the standout numbers are potent enough to carry this from start to finish." Steve Jones of USA Today said, "The Kansas City rapper explores facets of his personality – fire, water, earth – using a variety of flows and eclectic beats. He harnesses a prodigious guest list (Cee Lo, Kendrick Lamar, Serj Tankian, T-Pain, The Doors) to create something unconventional."

Eric Diep of XXL said, "Though Tech proves he's a master of the flow and storytelling ("My Haiku—Burn The World", "Fragile", "Priorities"), his approach to what he dubs as "beautiful music" has yet to reach the level of pop culture icon. Something Else—his most cohesive balance of indie and mainstream—will be remembered as an album that brought him closer to acceptance. Whether Tech wants the bigger fame or not is unclear, but it's safe to say the growth he displays here is one step nearer. He's strange, he's provocative, but the lesser shock value on this album marks it as his true debut to a larger audience." Paul Cantor of Vibe gave the album a positive review, saying "Is Something Else a milestone in Tech N9ne's career, the quintessential album he's been waiting to make his whole career? Tough to say. The LP has a cornucopia of guests, but they all show up in force and only occasionally detract from the material. There aren't any blatantly bad songs, but sure, you might skip a few. It happens. And do all the tracks fit neatly into the project's conceptual arc? No, but even attempting something like that is a tall task, and the album as a straight listen certainly exhibits a noted change in musical direction as it plays, which is a commendable. Though he's not exactly the outsider he once was, Tech N9ne fans—the die-hards and the johnny-come-latelys—should really enjoy this album." Steve Juon of RapReviews said, "Is "Something Else" excessive? Not for a 20+ year veteran who has been a certified star for at least 14, and not given how many guest features factor in. It's a sign of Tech's confidence that the lead single "So Dope (They Wanna)" gives equal time to Wrekonize, Snow Tha Product and Twisted Insane flowing over the Shane Eli/Jon Pakfar beat - and Tech's flow on the opening verse shows he hasn't slowed with age."

=== Accolades ===
Something Else was ranked at number 23 on XXL's list of the best albums of 2013. They commented saying, "There's plenty for everyone here: dark emotional songs ("I'm Not A Saint",) trap hyphy bangers ("Dwamn") and radio-friendly cuts ("See Me"). Despite the fact that Tech is exploring heavy metal rock with his Therapy EP, you can always count on him for a solid hip-hop album."

== Commercial performance ==
Something Else debuted at number four on the US Billboard 200, with first-week sales of 58,000 copies in the United States. It would be the highest first week sales of an album for his career. In its second week, the album sold 17,000 more copies in the United States. In its third week, the album sold 10,000 more copies in the United States. In its fourth week, the album sold 7,000 more copies bringing its total album sales to 92,000.

== Track listing ==
Credits adapted from the album's liner notes.

Something Else track listing
No.	Title	Writer(s)	Producer(s)	Length
1.	"News with Mark Alford 1 (Skit)"	Mark Alford; Michael Summers	Seven	1:16
2.	"Straight Out the Gate" (featuring Krizz Kaliko and Serj Tankian)	Aaron Yates; Summers; Samuel Watson; Serj Tankian	Seven	4:09
3.	"B.I.T.C.H." (featuring T-Pain)	Yates; Faheem Najm; Summers	Seven	4:27
4.	"With the BS" (featuring Big Scoob, Red Café and Trae tha Truth)	Yates; Frazier Thompson; Jermaine Denny; Summers; Steward Ashby	Seven	4:35
5.	"Love 2 Dislike Me" (featuring Liz Suwandi and Tyler Lyon)	Yates; Elizabeth Arnold; Summers; Tyler Lyon	Seven	3:53
6.	"Fortune Force Field"	Yates; Summers	Seven	4:16
7.	"I'm Not a Saint"	Yates; Summers	Seven	4:29
8.	"Fragile" (featuring Kendrick Lamar, ¡Mayday! and Kendall Morgan)	Yates; Benjamin Miller; Bernardo Garcia; Daniel Perez; Gianni Perocarpi; Kendal Morgan; Kendrick Duckworth; Ralfy Valencia	¡Mayday!; Daniel "Keys" Perez; Ralfy "FAFA" Valencia	3:55
9.	"Priorities" (featuring Angel Davenport and The Game)	Yates; Ashley Hart; Jayceon Taylor; Summers	Seven	1:43
10.	"News with Mark Alford 2 (Skit)"	Alford; Summers	Seven	0:41
11.	"Dwamn"	Yates; Summers	Seven	2:57
12.	"So Dope (They Wanna)" (featuring Snow Tha Product, Twisted Insane and Wrekonize)	Yates; Miller; Claudia Feliciano; Jonathan Pakfar; Michael Johnson; Shane Eli Abrahams	Abrahams; Pakfar	4:18
13.	"See Me" (featuring B.o.B and Wiz Khalifa)	Yates; Bobby Simmons, Jr.; Cameron Thomaz; Christopher Gholson	Drumma Boy	4:09
14.	"My Haiku-Burn the World" (featuring Krizz Kaliko)	Yates; Watson; Tramaine Winfey	Seven; Young Fyre; Andrew Lloyd^{[a]}	4:01
15.	"That's My Kid" (featuring Big K.R.I.T., CeeLo Green and Kutt Calhoun)	Yates; Justin Scott; Summers; Melvin Calhoun; Thomas Callaway	Seven	4:22
16.	"Meant to Happen" (featuring Scoop DeVille)	Yates; Elijah Molina	Scoop DeVille	3:55
17.	"News with Mark Alford 3 (Skit)"	Alford; Summers	Seven	0:53
18.	"Believe"	Yates; Summers	Seven	3:52
19.	"R.I.P. Ray (Skit)"			0:07
20.	"Strange 2013" (featuring The Doors)	The Doors	Fredwreck^{[a]}	3:31
21.	"SMB"			0:04
Total length:				65:44

Deluxe edition (bonus tracks)
No.	Title	Writer(s)	Producer(s)	Length
22.	"Colorado" (featuring B.o.B, Ces Cru, Krizz Kaliko, ¡Mayday!, Rittz and Stevie Stone)	Yates; Garcia; Miller; Simmons, Jr.; Gholson; Donnie King; Jonathan McCollum; Mike Viglione; Watson; Stephen Williams	Drumma Boy	4:53
23.	"Drowning" (featuring Liz Suwandi)	Yates; Arnold; Summers	Seven	4:33
24.	"Thizzles" (featuring Danny Brown)	Yates; Daniel Sewell; Winfrey	Young Fyre; Steven J. Collins^{[a]}	3:53

Strange Music online pre-order digital bonus track
No.	Title	Length
25.	"Party The Pain Away" (featuring Liz Suwandi)	4:03

Monster Energy digital bonus track
No.	Title	Length
25.	"Rock-A-Bye" (featuring Ben-G Da Prince of Soul)	4:57

Digital deluxe edition (bonus tracks)
No.	Title	Writer(s)	Producer(s)	Length
25.	"Somebody Else" (featuring Krizz Kaliko)	Yates; Watson; Summers	Seven	3:40
26.	"Feels Like Heaven" (featuring Krizz Kaliko and Oobergeek)	Yates; Watson; Marcus Yates; Summers	Seven	4:19

Notes

- ^{^[a]} signifies an additional producer
- "Straight Out the Gate" features additional vocals by Ashton Summers, Avery Geiger, Christina Summers, Christopher Watson Jr., Izabel Castellano, Jasmyn Geiger, Mackenzie O'Guin, and Roneesha Geiger
- "Dwamn" features additional vocals by Emma Frost
- "My Haiku-Burn the World" features additional vocals by Crystal Watson and Delynia Brown
- "That's My Kid" features additional vocals by Avery Geiger, Crystal Watson, and Delynia Brown
- "Believe" features additional vocals by Crystal Watson, Delynia Brown, Kendra Matthews, and Kortney Leveringston
- "Colorado" features additional vocals by DJ P-Caso, Frizz, Scenario, and Info Gates
- "Thizzles" features additional vocals by Richie Abbott

Sample credits

- "Strange 2013" contains a sample of "Strange Days" as performed by The Doors.

== Personnel ==
Credits adapted from AllMusic.

- Shane Eli Abrahams – producer
- Derek "MixedByAli" Ali – vocal engineer
- Chris Athens – mastering
- Bernz – producer, vocals
- Big K.R.I.T. – vocals
- Big Scoob – featured artist, vocals
- B.o.B – featured artist, vocals
- Sam Bohl – assistant engineer
- Delynia Brown – vocals
- Violet Brown – production assistant
- Kutt Calhoun – vocals
- Valdora Case – production assistant
- Gianni Ca$h – producer, vocals
- Izabel Castellano – vocals
- Liz Codd – violin
- Glenda Cowan – production assistant
- Ben Cybulsky – arranger, engineer, mixing
- Angel Davanport – vocals
- The Doors – featured artist
- Jim Fanning – cover illustration
- Brett Turner Francis – string arrangements, string conductor
- Emma Frost – vocals
- Game – vocals
- Avery Geiger – vocals
- Jasmyn Geiger – vocals
- Roneesha Geiger – vocals
- Drumma Boy – producer
- Cee Lo Green – vocals
- Lan Jiang – cello
- Krizz Kaliko – featured artist, vocals
- Kendrick Lamar – featured artist, vocals
- Kortney Leveringston – vocals
- Andrew Lloyd – additional production
- Korey Lloyd – production assistant
- Tyler Lyon – featured artist, vocals
- Fabian Marasciullo – mixing
- Kendra Matthews – vocals
- ¡Mayday! – featured artist
- James Meierotto – photography
- Elijah Molina – featured artist, producer, vocals
- Kendall Morgan – featured artist, vocals
- "Fredwreck" Farid Nassar – additional production
- Cory Nielsen – production assistant
- Dawn O'Guin – production assistant
- Mackenzie O'Guin – vocals
- Jonathan Pakfar – producer
- Fabio Peixoto – violin
- Daniel "Keys" Perez – producer
- Red Café – featured artist, vocals
- Sadikov String Quartet – strings
- Shokhrukh Sadikov – viola
- Snow tha Product – featured artist, vocals
- Ashton Summers – vocals
- Christina Summers – vocals
- Michael "Seven" Summers – associate producer, bass, producer
- Liz Suwandi – featured artist, vocals
- T-Pain – featured artist, vocals
- Serj Tankian – featured artist, vocals
- Tech N9ne – primary artist
- Trae Tha Truth – featured artist, vocals
- Travis O'Guin – executive producer
- Twisted Insane – featured artist, vocals
- Ralfy "FAFA" Valencia – producer
- Crystal Watson – vocals
- Christopher Watson, Jr. – vocals
- Dave Weiner – associate producer
- Jace Wilbert – guitar
- Tramaine "Youngfyre" Winfrey – producer
- Wiz Khalifa – featured artist, vocals
- Wrekonize – featured artist, producer, vocals

== Charts ==
=== Weekly charts ===
Chart performance for Something Else
Chart (2013)	Peak position
Canadian Albums (Billboard)	10
US Billboard 200	4
US Top R&B/Hip-Hop Albums (Billboard)	3

=== Year-end charts ===
2013 year-end chart performance for Something Else
Chart (2013)	Position
US Top Independent Albums (Billboard)	21
US Top R&B/Hip-Hop Albums (Billboard)	51

2014 year-end chart performance for Something Else
Chart (2014)	Position
US Top R&B/Hip-Hop Albums (Billboard)	86
