= The War Within (Wrekonize album) =

Studio album by Wrekonize
- Released: June 25, 2013
- Recorded: 2011–2013
- Genre: Hip hop
- Length: 64:21
- Label: Strange
- Producer: Wrekonize; Seven; Plex Luthor; Gianni Ca$h; K-Salaam; Beatnick; Streetrunner; Sarom; WillPower; Drop Dead Beats; DJ Sharpsound; Infamous; Miami Beat Wave; The Countyboyz

Wrekonize chronology
A Soiree For Skeptics (2010)	The War Within (2013)	Into the Further (2017)

The War Within is the second studio album by American rapper Wrekonize. The album was released on June 25, 2013, by Strange Music. The album features guest appearances from Bernz, Tech N9ne, Crooked I, Posdnuos, Bun B and Liz Suwandi. The album debuted at number 88 on the Billboard 200 chart, in the first week of its release.

== Background ==
In a June 2013, interview with the Miami New Times, Wrekonize spoke about the story behind the song "Anxiety", saying: "It was written on some real-life shit I went through a few years ago, not expressing my emotions, not venting when stress hit. If you don't vent and let out what you're feeling ... I had a serious anxiety attack during the early ¡Mayday! and been trying to deal it with it through music. And on top of that, I meet people who have serious anxiety all the time, so it resonates with a lot of people." He also spoke about the song "Freak", saying: "Street Runner did the beat. He's a Miami homie. Him and Sarom made the beat. The original had a sample in there and Bernz walked in and said, "Damn, you should record that on some freak shit and have Tech on there." He's killer for that subject matter, and it just went from there. The song has a double meaning. There's women and dudes out there that take it to an extreme of freaky stuff in their bedrooms. That's cool. And then there's freaks that don't fit in or are outside the norm and on their own path."

== Release and promotion ==
On May 8, 2013, the music video was released for "Anxiety Attacks". On May 30, 2013, the music video was released for "Freak" featuring Tech N9ne. On June 12, 2013, the music video was released for "We Got Soul". On June 25, 2013, the music video was released for "Neon Skies".

== Critical reception ==
Professional ratings
Review scores
Source	Rating
AllMusic	4/5 stars
HipHopDX	4/5 stars

The War Within received generally positive reviews from music critics. Bruce Smith of HipHopDX gave the album four out of five stars, saying "Throughout, The War Within, Wrekonize provides dope rhymes, substance, and even successfully strays away from the standard Hip Hop formula with offerings such as "All Alone." The features are varied, appropriate when used (including solid performances by Posdnuos and Bun B on "Church Road" and "Easy Money" respectively), and Wreck never appears overmatched. At a time when many artists are flocking toward the same dozen beatsmits, Wreck chose production that is both different while still complementing his flows and subject matter. A couple of great songs would have made this a near-classic album, but in the current climate of subpar rhymes, excessive useless features, and musical experiments gone wrong, an overall superior effort filled for the most part with good music is to be appreciated nonetheless." David Jeffries of AllMusic gave the album four out of five stars, saying "With the productions from DJ Sharpsound, Michael "Seven" Summers, and others being rich, plus guest artists Beanz, Posdnous, and Tech N9ne all sounding inspired, the only thing left to mention is that Wrekonize is great with the hooks as well. Combine it all and this is a therapy session worth sitting in on, again and again."

== Track listing ==
No.	Title	Producer(s)	Length
1.	"Intro (Dr. Chosis)"	Wrekonize	2:08
2.	"We Got Soul"	Seven	3:22
3.	"Paper Trails" (featuring Bernz)	Plex Luthor; Gianni Ca$h	5:00
4.	"Typical"	K-Salaam; Beatnick	4:34
5.	"Freak" (featuring Tech N9ne)	Streetrunner; Sarom	2:49
6.	"Can't Be Alone"	K-Salaam; Beatnick	4:16
7.	"Floating Away"	WillPower	3:40
8.	"Adrenaline" (featuring Crooked I)	Seven	3:51
9.	"Haunted" (featuring Bernz)	Drop Dead Beats	3:30
10.	"Anxiety Attacks"	DJ Sharpsound	3:53
11.	"Galil"	Plex Luthor; Gianni Ca$h	4:00
12.	"Modern Man"	Infamous	3:22
13.	"Neon Skies"	Seven	3:41
14.	"Church Road" (featuring Posdnuos)	Miami Beat Wave	5:00
15.	"Easy Money" (featuring Bun B)	WillPower	4:35
16.	"Better Things"	K-Salaam; Beatnick	3:17
17.	"Rise" (featuring Liz Suwandi)	Drop Dead Beats	3:24
Total length:			64:21

Deluxe edition bonus tracks
No.	Title	Producer(s)	Length
18.	"Smile Tonight" (featuring Bernz)	The Countyboyz	4:26
19.	"Puppet Masters"	Seven	3:53
20.	"In the Morning"	WillPower	3:30

Strange Music pre-order digital bonus track
No.	Title	Length
21.	"Black Magic City" (featuring Ras Kass)	3:43

== Charts ==
Chart (2013)	Peak position
US Billboard 200	88
US Top R&B/Hip-Hop Albums (Billboard)	16
US Independent Albums (Billboard)	27
