= ¡MursDay! =

¡Mursday!

Studio album by ¡Mursday! (¡Mayday! and Murs)
- Released: June 10, 2014
- Recorded: 2013–2014
- Genre: Hip-hop
- Length: 55:57
- Label: Strange
- Producer: Bernz; DJ Fuse; Danny 'Keys' Perez; Gianni Ca$h; Keith Cooper; ¡Mayday!; Miami Beat Wave; Murs; Plex Luthor; Ryan 'Myagi' Evans; Ralfy 'Fafa' Valencia; Wrekonize

¡Mayday! chronology
Believers (2013)	¡MursDay! (2014)	Future Vintage (2015)

Murs chronology
The Final Adventure (2012)	¡MursDay! (2014)	Have a Nice Life (2015)

Singles from ¡MursDay!
- 1. "Tabletops" Released: April 21, 2014

¡Mursday! is the self-titled debut album by American hip-hop group ¡Mursday!, which consists of the group ¡Mayday! and rapper Murs. The album was released on June 10, 2014, by Strange Music.

== Singles ==
The album's first single, "Tabletops" was released on April 21, 2014. On May 1, 2014, the music video for "Tabletops" was released. On June 6, 2014, the music video for "Here" was released. On May 29, 2014, the music video for "Serge's Song" was released.

== Critical response ==
Professional ratings
Review scores
Source	Rating
AllMusic	4/5 stars
Exclaim!	7/10
XXL	(L)

¡MursDay! was met with generally positive reviews from music critics. David Jeffries of AllMusic gave the album four out of five stars, saying, "If it didn't seem like destiny before, the Strange Music debut from Murs certifies that Tech N9ne's imprint is an ideal home for the alternative/underground/cult rapper. Besides that, teaming Murs with house band and genre-busters Mayday! is a brilliant idea, as the Strange freshman is eased into the scene with a sideline/collaborative release, but with both parties sharing a temperament that's hyperactive, ¡Mursday! comes off like a thrilling comic book team-up issue on wax." Rachel Chesbrough of XXL gave the album an L rating, saying "It lacks timelessness and may fade with the season it’s built to thrive in. That said, if you’re going to blend two coasts for a summer album, ¡MursDay! proves that there are no better cities than LA and Miami to get the job done." Thomas Quinlan of Exclaim! gave the album a seven out of ten, saying "While ¡Mursday! isn't "the most amazing music you've heard in the past, uh, 40 years," as claimed by Murs on "Intro," it is a great summertime album that should receive a lot of play throughout the season."

== Commercial performance ==
The album debuted at number 45 on the Billboard 200 chart, with first-week sales of 8,024 copies in the United States.

== Track listing ==
No.	Title	Writer(s)	Producer(s)	Length
1.	"Intro"	Nicholas Carter; Bernardo Garcia; Benjamin Miller; Gianni Perocarpi	¡Mayday!; Murs	0:58
2.	"Tabletops"	Carter; Garcia; Miller; Andrews Diaz Mujica; Perocarpi	Gianni Ca$h; Wrekonize; Bernz	2:46
3.	"Zones"	Carter; Aaron Eckhart; Garcia; Miller; Perocarpi	Plex Luthor; Gianni Ca$h	3:30
4.	"My Own Parade"	Carter; Garcia; Miller; Perocarpi; Charlton Williams	Bernz; Miami Beat Wave; Wrekonize; Gianni Ca$h	3:30
5.	"New Toys (Hey Love)"	Carter; Eckhart; Garcia; Miller; Kendall Morgan; Perocarpi	Plex Luthor; Gianni Ca$h	3:23
6.	"Brand New Get Up"	Carter; Garcia; Anjuli Gonzalez; Miller; Mujica; Perocarpi; Robert Smiley	Gianni Ca$h	4:18
7.	"You Again"	Carter; Garcia; Miller; Perocarpi	Gianni Ca$h	4:57
8.	"Serge’s Song"	Carter; Eckhart; Garcia; Miller; Perocarpi	Plex Luthor; Gianni Ca$h	2:45
9.	"Beast Out the Box"	Carter; Keith Cooper; Garcia; Miller; Mujica; Daniel Emilio Perez; Perocarpi; Eli Oakleaf Saposnick; Ralfy Valencia	Gianni Ca$h	4:59
10.	"Bitcoin Beezy"	Carter; Cooper; Garcia; Miller; Mujica; Antonio Olivera; Perez; Perocarpi; Valencia	Gianni Ca$h; Ralfy 'Fafa' Valencia; Danny 'Keys' Perez; Keith Cooper; DJ Fuse; Bernz; Wrekonize	3:44
11.	"Here"	Carter; Garcia; Miller; Mujica; Perez; Oscar Quesada	Wrekonize; Gianni Ca$h; Bernz	3:41
12.	"New Years Day"	Carter; Ryan Evans; Garcia; Miller; Perez; Perocarpi	Gianni Ca$h; Ryan 'Myagi' Evans	4:56
13.	"Spiked Punch"	Carter; Cooper; Garcia; Miller; Perocarpi; Ted Zimmerman	Gianni Ca$h	3:02
14.	"Outro"	Carter; Garcia; Miller; Perocarpi	Gianni Ca$h	3:09
Total length:				55:57

Deluxe edition bonus tracks
No.	Title	Writer(s)	Producer(s)	Length
15.	"Fools Gold"	Carter; Eckhart; Garcia; Miller	Plex Luthor	3:08
16.	"Give You My All"	Carter; Eckhart; Garcia; Sylvan Lacue; Miller; Perocarpi	Plex Luthor; Gianni Ca$h	3:11

Strange Music pre-order digital bonus track
No.	Title	Length
17.	"Zombies on 7th Street"	4:22

== Charts ==
Chart (2014)	Peak position
US Billboard 200	45
US Independent Albums (Billboard)	12
US Top Rap Albums (Billboard)	4
