= Believers (¡Mayday! album) =

Studio album by ¡Mayday!
- Released: July 16, 2013
- Recorded: 2012–2013
- Genre: Hip-hop
- Length: 60:31
- Label: Strange
- Producer: Plex Luthor; Gianni Ca$h; Infamous; Ralfy; Wrekonize

¡Mayday! chronology
Take Me to Your Leader (2012)	Believers (2013)	¡MursDay! (2014)

Believers is the fourth studio album by American hip-hop group ¡Mayday!. The album was released on July 16, 2013, by Strange Music. The album features guest appearances from Kardinal Offishall, Tech N9ne, Irv Da Phenom, Anjuli Stars, David Correy, Stevie Stone and Kendall Morgan.

== Background ==
In a June 2013 interview with HipHopDX, ¡Mayday! spoke about why they chose to title the album Believers, saying:

We felt like we wanted to talk about the people who are true ¡MAYDAY! fans and address them. This album was talking to them in a way. Metaphorically, we feel like the universe gives you what you want, and we feel like we’re blessed by the universe, ‘cause we’re strong enough to ask and do what we need to do to make things happen. We feel like the universe works for you. Not to be corny, but you gotta believe it to see it. That’s why the cover is this little kid with a slingshot that just took down a helicopter, you know? It’s about seeing is believing. That’s what ¡MAYDAY! is. When you see us, you believe us. We turn people on all the time.

In the same interview, they spoke about the inspiration behind the song "Marathon Man", saying:

We have a song called “Marathon Man” inspired by the Boston bombing. Instead of a preachy gotta-save-the-world record, we wanted to talk about it because it was crazy event so we wanted to do a story on it when you're in the race. Imagine a story of you in the race and there's a bomb. You still runnin’, ‘cause you wanna win that race. You don’t wanna let that event stop you from doing what you wanna do in your life.

== Critical response ==
Professional ratings
Review scores
Source	Rating
AllMusic	3.5/5 stars
DJBooth	4.5/5 stars
HipHopDX	4/5 stars

Believers was met with positive reviews from music critics. Alec Siegel of DJBooth gave the album four and half stars out of five, saying

Although the majority of Believers is a high quality melting pot of sounds and vocals, the album has its flaws, and hits an especially rough patch of three tracks beginning with My Life and ending with Tear Sh*t Down. The latter’s chorus sounds like a throwaway Black Eyed Peas song, and Wrekonize and Bernz seem to slow down their flow and dumb down their lyrics a bit. The former is repetitive in its beat and hook, and cliché in its concept and execution. This sobering, short lived mid-album dip in quality doesn’t last long though, as the band picks things up immediately and finishes the festivities with some of the album’s best tracks (Forever New, Shortcuts and Dead Ends).

Andres Vasquez of HipHopDX gave the album four out of five stars, saying

Believers is another notch in Strange Music’s belt, one that explains why ¡Mayday! has become such a highly touted group. It’s an example of how a mash-up of genres can be executed well, without watering down all of the Hip Hop ingredients. It isn’t a straight-up Hip Hop record, but then again, as mentioned, it’s really hard to categorize it. Instead, it stands as a strong showing, even if done with an outside-the-box approach you can’t label. Now if genre-bending ain’t for you, this album may not be either. However, if a mind is open to different styles and various influences, then even naysayers may turn into Believers.

David Jeffries of AllMusic gave the album three and a half stars out of five, saying

Strange thing is, everything works, and yet Believers doesn't flow as well as 2012's like-minded Take Me to Your Leader. Still, it's best to think of this album as a worthy second choice rather than a significant step down.

== Commercial performance ==
The album debuted at number 75 on the Billboard 200 chart, with first-week sales of 5,100 copies in the United States. As of July 2015, the album had sold 18,000 copies in the US.

== Track listing ==
No.	Title	Producer(s)	Length
1.	"Believers"	Plex Luthor; Gianni Ca$h	3:05
2.	"Shots Fired"	Plex Luthor; Gianni Ca$h	3:52
3.	"Unplug" (featuring Kardinal Offishall)	Plex Luthor; Gianni Ca$h	4:43
4.	"Last One Standing" (featuring Tech N9ne)	Gianni Ca$h	4:38
5.	"HighRide"	Infamous	3:40
6.	"Good Pressure"	Plex Luthor; Gianni Ca$h	4:07
7.	"My Life" (featuring Irv Da Phenom)	Plex Luthor; Infamous	3:50
8.	"On That Jack"	Gianni Ca$h	3:57
9.	"Tear Shit Down"	Infamous	3:37
10.	"Mortuary Mary" (featuring Anjuli Stars)	Gianni Ca$h; Plex Luthor	2:56
11.	"Save Ferris" (featuring David Correy)	Plex Luthor; Gianni Ca$h	4:03
12.	"Marathon Man"	Infamous; Ralfy	4:44
13.	"Forever New" (featuring Stevie Stone)	Gianni Ca$h	4:59
14.	"Stun Gun Stickup"	Plex Luthor; Gianni Ca$h	3:36
15.	"Shortcuts and Dead Ends"	Gianni Ca$h	4:45
Total length:			60:31

Deluxe edition bonus tracks
No.	Title	Producer(s)	Length
16.	"Bad Religion" (featuring Kendall Morgan)	Gianni Ca$h	2:55
17.	"The Fight"	Plex Luthor; Gianni Ca$h	3:45
18.	"Upstream"	Plex Luthor; Gianni Ca$h	3:38

Strange Music Online Pre-Order Digital Bonus Track
No.	Title	Producer(s)	Length
19.	"Drift"	Gianni Ca$h; Wrekonize	3:30

== Charts ==
Chart (2013)	Peak position
US Billboard 200	75
US Top R&B/Hip-Hop Albums (Billboard)	19
US Independent Albums (Billboard)	15
