= The Plott Thickens =

Studio album by Grave Plott
- Released: May 20, 2008
- Genre: Horrorcore, Hardcore hip hop, Gangsta rap
- Length: 71:56
- Label: Strange Music
- Producer: Bar None; Jon Connor; Leo Project; Robert Rebeck; Seven

Grave Plott chronology
Puttin' U In (2005)	The Plott Thickens (2008)

Professional ratings
Review scores
Source	Rating
RapReviews	(5.5/10)

The Plott Thickens is the only studio album by Grave Plott, released on May 20, 2008 under Strange Music. It debuted at number 95 on the Top R&B/Hip-Hop Albums chart. The album sold 1,189 units in its first week of release.

== Track listing ==
No.	Title	Writer(s)	Producer(s)	Length
1.	"Intro (Skit)" (featuring Tech N9ne)	A. Yates	Robert Rebeck	01:26
2.	"The Plott Thickens"	C. Hill, C. Toombs	Bar None	03:07
3.	"Street Life" (featuring Spice 1)	C. Hill, C. Toombs, R. Green	Robert Rebeck	03:46
4.	"Felony Livin'"	C. Hill, C. Toombs	Robert Rebeck	02:50
5.	"Bad Bitch"	C. Hill, C. Toombs	Bar None	03:51
6.	"Buckin'" (featuring Haystak)	C. Hill, C. Toombs, J. Winfrey	Jon Connor	04:24
7.	"Shit Talking Phone (Skit)"	C. Hill, C. Toombs	Robert Rebeck	00:49
8.	"Alcoholic Anthem (A.A.)" (featuring Robert Rebeck)	C. Hill	Robert Rebeck	02:53
9.	"Snap" (featuring Tech N9ne)	A. Yates, C. Hill, C. Toombs	Seven	04:41
10.	"Stop Snitchin'"	C. Hill, C. Toombs	Seven	03:56
11.	"Murda Iz Tha Time (Part 2)" (featuring Krizz Kaliko)	C. Hill, C. Toombs, S. Watson	Seven	05:02
12.	"In The Streets" (featuring BG Bulletwound, Kutt Calhoun & Skatterman & Snug Brim)	A. Henderson, C. Toombs, G. Roland, M. Calhoun, S. Landis	Bar None	05:19
13.	"Get Loose"	C. Hill, C. Toombs	Bar None	02:33
14.	"Beat Box (Skit)"	C. Toombs, J. Tossey	Robert Rebeck	00:44
15.	"Don't Bite The Hand That Feeds You" (featuring Robert Rebeck)	C. Hill, C. Toombs	Leo Project	02:47
16.	"Midwest" (featuring Skatterman & Snug Brim)	A. Henderson, C. Hill, C. Toombs, S. Landis	Robert Rebeck	04:42
17.	"Killa Season" (featuring Brotha Lynch Hung)	C. Hill, C. Toombs, K. Mann	Robert Rebeck	03:17
18.	"G-Shit" (featuring Kutt Calhoun)	C. Hill, C. Toombs, M. Calhoun	Robert Rebeck	03:37
19.	"Broken Home"	C. Hill, C. Toombs	Seven	04:25
20.	"My Life"	C. Toombs	Robert Rebeck	03:52
21.	"Need A Change" (featuring Krizz Kaliko)	C. Hill, S. Watson	Bar None	03:55
Total length:				71:56
