= Special Effects (album) =

Studio album by Tech N9ne
- Released: May 4, 2015
- Recorded: 2013–2015
- Genre: Hip-hop
- Length: 77:04
- Label: Strange
- Producers: Seven; N4; Excision; Joseph Bishara

Tech N9ne chronology
Strangeulation (2014)	Special Effects (2015)	Strangeulation Vol. II (2015)

Singles from Special Effects
- 1. "Aw Yeah?" Released: March 26, 2015; 2. "Hood Go Crazy" Released: February 26, 2015; 3. "On the Bible" Released: May 4, 2015; 4. "No K" Released: September 23, 2015

Special Effects is the fifteenth studio album by American rapper Tech N9ne. It was released on May 4, 2015, by Strange Music. The album is broken up into several portions representing days of the week, with collaborations with artists including Corey Taylor, B.o.B, Lil Wayne, 2 Chainz, T.I., Hopsin, E-40, Yo Gotti, Audio Push and Eminem, among others. The album also features fellow Strange Music artists Krizz Kaliko, Big Scoob and Ces Cru. Production on the album was handled by Seven, Strange Music's in-house producer, Excision along with Joseph Bishara who was the composer of Insidious and The Conjuring.

== Critical reception ==
Professional ratings
Review scores
Source	Rating
AllMusic	3.5/5 stars
Artistdirect	(Favorable)
RapReviews	7.5/10
XXL	(XL)

Special Effects was met with generally positive reviews from music critics. David Jeffries of AllMusic said, "Sticking to his guns with angry, soul-searching lyrics spewing out while the high-powered crossover collaborations fly about, Tech N9ne skillfully rides his career trajectory as it soars ever upwards with Special Effects, an album that's powerful more than purposeful, plus a therapy session where all the party people can sing along." Eric Diep of HipHopDX praised the production, and said, "Casual listeners — who are more familiar with his Hip Hop catalogue — will likely be turned off by the handful of straight-up rap records. His core audience, though, will revel in the album's moments like the return of "Psycho Bitch" with a crazy storytelling verse from Hopsin over sinister production." Michael Blair of XXL said, "Steadily nearing the fine line between underground and mainstream for years now, Tech’s 15th studio album finds itself as the apex of where the two classifications meet and invite both the well-acquainted enthusiast and the curious onlooker."

== Commercial performance ==
The album debuted at number 4 on the Billboard 200, selling 60,000 copies in the United States. In its second week of sales, the album sold 14,000 copies in the United States.

== Track listing ==
Sunday Morning
No.	Title	Writer(s)	Producer(s)	Length
1.	"The Procedure (Intro)"			0:14
2.	"Aw Yeah? (InterVENTion)"	Aaron Yates; Michael Summers; Isaac Cates	Seven	2:50
3.	"Lacrimosa"	Yates; Samuel Watson; Summers; Cates	Seven	4:18
4.	"Condolences (skit)"			0:26

Sunday Evening
No.	Title	Writer(s)	Producer(s)	Length
5.	"On the Bible" (featuring T.I. and Zuse)	Yates; Summers; Clifford Harris, Jr.; Cheikh Gordon	Seven	4:09
6.	"Shroud" (featuring Krizz Kaliko)	Yates; Watson; Summers; Joseph Bishara	Seven; Bishara	4:47
7.	"More Psycho Messages (skit)"			0:52
8.	"Psycho Bitch III" (featuring Hopsin)	Yates; Watson; Summers; Marcus Hopson	Seven	4:55
9.	"Wither" (featuring Corey Taylor)	Yates; Summers; Corey Taylor	Seven	4:43
10.	"Dead Alive (skit)"			0:33

Monday
No.	Title	Writer(s)	Producer(s)	Length
11.	"Hood Go Crazy" (featuring 2 Chainz and B.o.B)	Yates; Tauheed Epps; Bobby Simmons, Jr.; Clarence Montgomery; Nick Luscombe; Freek van Workum	N4	3:45
12.	"Bass Ackwards" (featuring Yo Gotti, Big Scoob and Lil Wayne)	Yates; Dwayne Carter, Jr.; Mario Mims; Steward Ashby; Summers	Seven	4:03

Tuesday
No.	Title	Writer(s)	Producer(s)	Length
13.	"No K" (featuring E-40 and Krizz Kaliko)	Yates; Watson; Summers; Earl Stevens	Seven	3:08

Wednesday
No.	Title	Writer(s)	Producer(s)	Length
14.	"Countdown (skit)"			0:13
15.	"Speedom (WWC2)" (featuring Krizz Kaliko and Eminem)	Yates; Watson; Summers; Marshall Mathers III; Richard Havens	Seven	4:55
16.	"Give It All" (featuring Audio Push and Krizz Kaliko)	Yates; Watson; Summers; Julian Brown; Larry Jacks	Seven	4:59
17.	"Yates" (featuring Marcus Yates)	Yates; Summers; Marcus Yates	Seven; M. Yates	3:47

Thursday
No.	Title	Writer(s)	Producer(s)	Length
18.	"M.T.M.D. (skit)"			0:15
19.	"A Certain Comfort" (featuring Kate Rose)	A. Yates; Summers; Kathryn Caggianelli	Seven	3:41
20.	"Burn It Down" (featuring Ryan Bradley)	A. Yates; Summers; Ryan Greshock; Lance Bennett	Seven	3:50

Friday
No.	Title	Writer(s)	Producer(s)	Length
21.	"Life Sentences" (featuring Krizz Kaliko, Joey Cool and Gee Watts)	A. Yates; Watson; Summers; Taven Johnson; Gary Watts	Seven	4:56

Saturday
No.	Title	Writer(s)	Producer(s)	Length
22.	"Dyin' Flyin'" (featuring Krizz Kaliko)	A. Yates; Watson; Summers; Cates	Seven	3:51

Sunday
No.	Title	Writer(s)	Producer(s)	Length
23.	"Worldly Angel"	A. Yates; Watson; Cates	Seven	4:59

Encore
No.	Title	Writer(s)	Producer(s)	Length
24.	"Roadkill" (Tech N9ne and Excision)	A. Yates; Watson; Jeff Abel	DJ Excision	2:56
Total length:				77:04

iTunes deluxe edition (bonus tracks)
No.	Title	Producer(s)	Length
25.	"Anti" (featuring Krizz Kaliko and Band of Psychos)	Seven	4:48
26.	"Young Dumb Full of Fun" (featuring Ces Cru and Mackenzie O'Guin)	Seven	3:35
Total length:			85:27

== Charts ==
=== Weekly charts ===
Weekly chart performance for Special Effects
Chart (2015)	Peak position
Canadian Albums (Billboard)	7
UK Independent Albums (Official Charts)	47
UK R&B Albums (Official Charts)	25
US Billboard 200	4
US Independent Albums (Billboard)	1
US Top R&B/Hip-Hop Albums (Billboard)	1

=== Year-end charts ===
Year-end chart performance for Special Effects
Chart (2015)	Position
US Billboard 200	192
US Independent Albums (Billboard)	13
US Top R&B/Hip-Hop Albums (Billboard)	34
