= ¡Mayday! =

American hip-hop group

- Origin: Miami, Florida, U.S.
- Genres: Hip-hop; rock
- Years active: 2003–present
- Labels: Strange Music; Mayday Music; It Goes Up
- Members: Bernz; NonMS; Wrekonize
- Past members: Plex Luthor; L T Hopkins; Gianni Ca$h
- Website: www.maydayonline.com

¡Mayday! (stylized in all caps as ¡MAYD∀Y!) is an American hip-hop group from Miami, Florida. The group comprises rappers Bernardo "Bernz" Garcia and Ben "Wrekonize" Miller, along with producer and percussionist Andrews "NonMS" Mujica. Until 2015, the group also included keyboard player and guitarist Aaron Eckhart (a.k.a. Plex Luthor), drummer Terrel (a.k.a. L T Hopkins), and bassist Gianni Perocapi (a.k.a. Gianni Ca$h). The band was formerly signed to Tech N9ne and Travis O'Guin's record label Strange Music. As of May 12, 2026, all future releases will be on their own label, Mayday Music, distributed by It Goes Up.

== Career ==
=== Foundation and Early Days (2003–2009) ===
The group was founded by Plex Luthor and Bernz in Miami in 2003. The band is known for its Miami-underground hit "Quicksand", which earned them a deal with SouthBeat Records, and their first single and 2006 music video "Groundhog Day", featuring Cee-Lo Green (directed by Jokes) which received over 2 million views on the online video site YouTube within only a day of being added. The band released their first studio album, ¡Mayday!, in September 2006.

In 2008, producer Gianni Ca$h joined the group. In 2009, vocalist and producer Wrekonize, percussionist NonMS, and drummer L.T. Hopkins joined ¡Mayday!, bringing the number of members to 6. In February 2009, ¡Mayday! released their first EP, "The Thinnest Line". A few months later, in June 2009, they released a follow-up EP titled "Technology".

=== Lords of the Fly & Stuck on an Island (2010) ===
Lil Wayne worked with the group for two unofficial videos; both videos - "Da Da Da" and "Get a Life", were filmed on the roof of a building in the middle of the day, with spectators apparently attending a free concert. Shortly after working with Lil Wayne, remixes of both tracks, plus another Lil Wayne track "On Fire" were released on ¡Mayday!'s first mixtape "Lords of the Fly". The mixtape included new tracks, remixes, and freestyles to serve as a prelude to their next album Stuck on an Island, which was released shortly after.

=== Signing with Strange Music (2011–2022) ===
In early 2011, independent label frontman Tech N9ne reached out to ¡Mayday!, and featured them on two tracks of his album Welcome to Strangeland. Bernz and Wrekonize were also featured on a bonus track of the album. On June 3, 2011, Mayday signed with Strange Music.

Their third studio album, Take Me to Your Leader, was their first major album released under Strange Music on March 26, 2012. The lead single from that album, titled "Badlands" and featuring Tech N9ne, received over half a million views on YouTube within the first two months. On August 27, 2012, Miami New Times uploaded a list of the 50 Best Miami Bands of All Time where ¡Mayday! was listed as #27. Along with their placement on the list, Miami New Times stated that "¡Mayday! just might be Miami rap's future." On August 7, 2012, ¡Mayday! released their first EP under Strange Music, "Thrift Store Halos".

On July 16, 2013, Mayday released their fourth studio album Believers. They also featured on Tech N9ne's single "Fragile", along with Kendrick Lamar, which was released shortly after Believers. In 2013, the band went on tour with Tech N9ne during his Something Else Tour.

In 2014 on June 10, Members of ¡Mayday! teamed up with newly signed Strange Music artist Murs to bring together ¡Mursday!. Shortly after the release of ¡Mursday!, ¡Mayday! and Murs released a free EP on SoundCloud presented by Boost Mobile titled "Ready 2 Run".

Shortly before ¡Mayday! released their sixth studio album Future Vintage on September 18, 2015, Plex Luthor formally departed the group on good terms. After the album release, the group toured all around the country. Along with touring, rappers Bernz and Wrekonize have been releasing their solo albums. On June 22, 2017, while on Facebook live, they announced their new album called Search Party with the album cover and a release date of September 8, 2017. On September 7, 2018, they released their next album called South of 5th.

=== Departure from Strange Music, Mayday Music (2022–present) ===
On May 1, 2022, during the group’s performance at Red Rocks Park and Amphitheater of Tech N9ne’s Asin9ne tour, ¡Mayday! addressed to the rumors in regards about the group’s current status with Strange Music. The group confirmed that they have amicably parted ways with Strange Music and formed a new independent record label, Mayday Music. Despite forming a new record label, ¡Mayday! will continue to work with former labelmate Tech N9ne and Strange Music co-founder Travis O’Guin as their new label will be distributed by Strange Music’s distribution company, It Goes Up Entertainment. On the same day, ¡Mayday! released a new single under their newly formed label, "Own Way."

== Discography ==
=== Studio albums ===
List of albums, with selected chart positions
Title	Album details	Peak chart positions			
Title	Album details	US	US R&B	US Rap	
¡Mayday!	Released: September 2006; Label: Mayday Music; Format: CD, download	—	—	—	
Stuck on an Island	Released: October 12, 2010; Label: Mayday Music; Format: CD, download	—	—	—	
Take Me to Your Leader	Released: March 26, 2012; Label: Strange Music; Format: CD, download	92	18	15	
Believers	Released: July 16, 2013; Label: Strange Music; Format: CD, download	75	19	11	
¡MursDay! (with Murs)	Released: June 10, 2014; Label: Strange Music; Format: CD, download	45	—	4	
Future Vintage	Released: September 18, 2015; Label: Strange Music; Format: CD, download	112	9	8	
Search Party	Released: September 8, 2017; Label: Strange Music; Format: CD, download	—	—	—	
South of 5th	Released: September 7, 2018; Label: Strange Music; Format: CD, download	—	—	—	
Minute to Midnight	Released: March 19, 2021; Label: Strange Music; Format: CD, download, streaming	—	—	—	
Justus	Released: March 18, 2025; Label: Mayday Music/It Goes Up; Format: CD, download, streaming	—	—	—	"—" denotes a title that did not chart, or was not released in that territory.

=== EPs ===
List of albums, with selected chart positions
Title	Album details	Peak chart positions		
Title	Album details	US	US R&B	US Rap
The Thinnest Line	Released: February 14, 2009; Label: Mayday Music; Format: CD, download	—	—	—
Technology	Released: June 23, 2009; Label: Mayday Music; Format: CD, download	—	—	—
Thrift Store Halos	Released: August 7, 2012; Label: Strange Music; Format: CD, download	153	23	16
The Thinnest Line, Pt. II	Released: February 15, 2019; Label: Strange Music; Format: Download	—	—	—
The Thinnest Line, Pt. 3	Released: February 14, 2024; Label: Mayday Music; Format: Download	—	—	—
"—" denotes a title that did not chart, or was not released in that territory.

=== Mixtapes ===
List of albums, with selected chart positions
Title	Album details	Peak chart positions		
Title	Album details	US	US R&B	US Rap
Lords Of The Fly	Released: September 28, 2010; Label: Mayday Music; Format: CD, download	—	—	—
Smash And Grab	Released: December 20, 2012; Label: Strange Music; Format: CD, download	—	—	—
"—" denotes a title that did not chart, or was not released in that territory.

=== Singles ===
==== As lead artist ====
List of singles as lead artist
Title	Album
"Tabletops" (with Murs)	¡MursDay!

==== As featured artist ====
List of extended plays, with selected chart positions
Title	Peak chart positions				Certifications	Album
Title	Bubbling under	US R&B	US Rap	FR	Certifications	Album
"Fragile" (Tech N9ne featuring Kendrick Lamar, ¡Mayday! and Kendall Morgan)	16	38	23	135		Something Else
"No Regrets" (Matt Schultz featuring ¡Mayday!)						No Regrets (Single)

=== Guest appearances ===
List of non-single guest appearances, with other performing artists, showing year released and album name
Title	Year	Other artist(s)	Album
"Retrogression"	2011	Tech N9ne	Welcome to Strangeland
"The Noose"	2011	Tech N9ne	Welcome to Strangeland
"EMJ"	2011	Tech N9ne, Irv da Phenom, Kutt Calhoun, Stevie Stone, Jay Rock, Krizz Kaliko, Magnum PI	Welcome to Strangeland
"Klusterfuk"	2012	Tech N9ne, Sassy	Klusterfuk
"Blur"	2012	Tech N9ne	Klusterfuk
"Can't Stand Me"	2012	Tech N9ne, Krizz Kaliko	Klusterfuk
"Ugly Duckling"	2012	Tech N9ne, Aqualeo	Klusterfuk
"Awkward"	2012	Tech N9ne	Klusterfuk
"D.K.N.Y."	2012	Tech N9ne, Krizz Kaliko	Klusterfuk
"Dream of a King"	2012	Krizz Kaliko, Prozak	Kickin' and Screamin'
"The Road"	2012	Stevie Stone, Magnum PI	Rollin' Stone
"Eating You"	2013	Brotha Lynch Hung	Mannibalector
"Fragile"	2013	Tech N9ne, Kendrick Lamar, Kendall Morgan	Something Else
"Colorado"	2013	Tech N9ne, B.o.B, Ces Cru, Krizz Kaliko, Rittz	Something Else
"Indigo"	2013	Stevie Stone, Mai Lee	2 Birds 1 Stone
"Head Now"	2013	Tech N9ne	Therapy
"Nobody Cares (The Remix)"	2014	Tech N9ne, Krizz Kaliko, Stevie Stone, Ces Cru	Strangeulation
"Strangeulation III"	2014	Kutt Calhoun, Ubiquitous	Strangeulation
"We Are Free"	2014	Tech N9ne	Strangeulation
"My Life"	2015	Prozak	Black Ink
"Wake and Bake"	2015	Tech N9ne, Krizz Kaliko	Strangeulation Vol. II
"Strangeulation Vol. II Cypher V"	2015	Murs	Strangeulation Vol. II
"Same Ol' Day"	2017	Murs, Eric Biddines	Captain California
"Madness (Remix)"	2019	Ubiquitous, Tech N9ne, Krizz Kaliko, Info Gates	Under Bad Influence
"Vibe"	2020	Stevie Stone, Stige	Black Lion
"It's All Me"	2020	Joey Cool	Coolie High
