= Stuck on an Island =

Studio album by ¡Mayday!
- Released: October 12, 2010
- Genre: Hip-hop; rap rock; alternative rock; alternative hip-hop
- Length: 1:13:00
- Label: Latchkey Recordings
- Producer: ¡Mayday! (also exec.)

¡Mayday! chronology
¡Mayday! (2006)	Stuck on an Island (2010)	Take Me to Your Leader (2012)

Stuck on an Island is the second studio album by Miami hip-hop collective ¡Mayday!, released via Latchkey Recordings. It is ¡Mayday!'s first album to feature the six man line-up of Bernz (vocals), Wrekonize (vocals), Plex Luthor (producer, keyboards, guitarist), Gianni Cash (producer, bassist), NonMS (percussionist) and L T Hopkins (drummer). Their first album ¡Mayday!, which was released in 2006, only featured Bernz and Plex Luthor.

== Track listing ==
No.	Title	Producer(s)	Length
1.	"I'll Be Gone"	Plex Luthor	4:16
2.	"Stuck On An Island"	Plex Luthor	3:34
3.	"No 1's Lookin"	Plex Luthor	4:25
4.	"Lost Highway"	Plex Luthor; Gianni Ca$h	3:35
5.	"Broads & Freqs"	Plex Luthor	3:45
6.	"Transparent" (featuring Snave Nayr)	Plex Luthor	3:32
7.	"Freak Show"	Plex Luthor; Gianni Ca$h; Wrekonize	4:04
8.	"Smoke & Mirrors"	Plex Luthor	3:52
9.	"On 2 Someth'n" (featuring Jovi Rockwell)	Plex Luthor	4:39
10.	"Worst Case Scenario" (featuring The Money Making Jam Boys)	Plex Luthor	3:56
11.	"Padded Walls"	Plex Luthor	3:46
12.	"Fire"	Plex Luthor; Wrekonize	3:41
13.	"Spare Change"	Plex Luthor; Wrekonize; Bernz	3:14
14.	"Sell Your Soul" (featuring Casely)	Plex Luthor	4:23
15.	"Make A Living"	Wrekonize	1:58
16.	"Pass The .45"	Plex Luthor	2:38
17.	"Technology"	Plex Luthor; Wrekonize	5:54
18.	"Picture Perfect" (featuring Shonie)	Gianni Ca$h; Plex Luthor	3:51
19.	"Part 3 (They Told Me)"	Plex Luthor	4:26
Total length:			73:29
