= Strange Music =

US record label

- Founded: 1999
- Founder: Tech N9ne; Travis O'Guin
- Distributors: Compound Interest Entertainment, Virgin Music Group
- Genre: Hip-hop; rap rock; R&B; pop
- Country of origin: U.S.
- Location: 1250 NE Sloan St, Lee's Summit, MO, 64086, U.S.
- Official website: strangemusicinc.com

Strange Music is an American independent record label specializing in hip-hop and founded by Tech N9ne and Travis O'Guin in 1999.

== History ==
In 2009 Skatterman & Snug Brim fulfilled their commitment to Strange Music and left the label.

In 2010 Jay Rock signed a multi-album deal with Strange Music.

In 2011 Stevie Stone joined the label in March and Prozak in December.

In 2012 Strange Music signed the duo CES Cru, made up of rappers Ubiquitous and Godemis, in January and Slumerican rapper Rittz in August.

In 2014, Murs signed with Strange Music in February and Kutt Calhoun and Jay Rock left Strange Music in September.

In 2016 Chicago-based pop group AboveWaves signed to the label.

In 2018 Strange Music announced a new pop music subsidiary Strange Main in February, and Murs left in March after completing his contract.

In 2019 Krizz Kaliko announced his intentions of leaving the label on October 6, then signed a new contract on stage on October 20. However, Kaliko officially announced his departure from Strange in order to form his own label Ear House Inc. on May 15, 2021.

== Subsidiaries ==
Strange Music West was announced in 2009 with Dave Weiner, formerly of Priority Records and JCOR Entertainment, as Vice President. Weiner immediately signed Brotha Lynch Hung to the label.

Strange Lane Records was started in 2010 and signed Young Bleed as its first artist.

Strange Main, a pop music division, was announced in 2018 with former radio personality Ponch Hudgens as Executive Director and C.E.O. Travis O'Guin's daughter Mackenzie as its flagship artist.

It Goes Up Entertainment is a subsidiary of Strange Music that acts as a distribution company to other artists and their labels or independent projects. It was founded and launched in 2021. It currently distributes artists Saigon, Jelly Roll, Dax & ¡Mayday!

== Roster ==
=== Current artists ===
Artist	Year signed	Albums released by Strange	Description
Tech N9ne	Founder	23	Rapper from Kansas City, Missouri, he co-founded the label alongside Travis O'Guin in 1999. Under the label, he has released an extensive collection of 23 albums, 12 EPs, and one mixtape, and has gone on to become the #1 independent artist in hip-hop. Released his twenty-fourth studio album, Bliss, on July 14, 2023.
Big Scoob	2009	4	Rapper from Kansas City, Missouri. Had appeared as an album guest on two of Tech N9ne's previous albums before signing with the label. Released his fourth studio album, Duality, on May 25, 2018.
Prozak	2011	4	Rapper from Saginaw, Michigan. Originally signed to the label in 2004 alongside Mike E. Clark as Project: Deadman, and the group released its only album Self Inflicted that same year. Released his debut solo album, Tales from the Sick, through the label in 2008, three years prior to his signing to the label as a solo act. Released his fourth studio album, Black Ink, on October 9, 2015.
Mackenzie Nicole	2015	2	Singer from Kansas City, Missouri, and daughter of Strange Music CEO Travis O'Guin. She made several guest appearances on numerous Tech N9ne songs, including "Fear" and "K.O.D", along with appearances on projects by other Strange Music artists before signing to the label. With "Actin Like You Know", Nicole produced her first song under Strange Music with the help of Krizz Kaliko and Seven. The song featured Tech N9ne and appeared on his sixteenth album, Strangeulation Vol. II. Released her second album, Mystic, on February 14, 2020.
AboveWaves	2016	1	Pop band from Chicago, Illinois. Consists of vocalist Ryan Bradley, guitarist Colin Greshock, drummer Lance Bennett, and bassist Bryan Walker. Has made appearances on Tech N9ne's fourteenth, fifteenth, and sixteenth albums before signing to the label. Released their debut studio album, Fugitives, on November 1, 2019.
Joey Cool	2017	5	Rapper from Kansas City, Missouri who worked with Tech N9ne on the Special Effects song "Life Sentences", as well as with several other Strange Music artists. Signing was announced at the Strange Reign Release Concert at Red Rocks, CO on October 13, 2017, alongside Jay Trilogy. Released his fifth album with Strange Music, The Chairman of the Board, on July 15, 2022.
Jay Trilogy	2017	—N/a	Rapper from Bloomington, Illinois, who won the PTSD Warrior Built Contest in 2016 before being signed the following year. The contract was announced live at the Strange Reign Release Concert at Red Rocks, CO on October 13, 2017, alongside Joey Cool.
Maez301	2018	3	Rapper from Gaithersburg, Maryland, who was discovered by Erving Pope and Jerome Taylor in 2017, both of whom later helped him to get signed the following year. The contract was announced on Instagram March 22, 2019. Maez301's real name is Hasaan Keller. Maez301 was born in Queens, New York, on November 3, 1993. He currently lives in Los Angeles, California. Released his third album, Hello, Goodbye on January 14, 2022.
King Iso	2019	3	Rapper from Omaha, Nebraska. His contract with Strange was announced on Instagram on May 10, 2019. Released his second album with Strange Music, Get Well Soon, on January 21, 2022. King Iso subsequently released his debut EP, 8 P.M. Med Call, on September 30, 2022.
Jehry Robinson	2019	2	Rapper originating from New York. The contract was announced on December 20, 2019. Released his sophomore album, The Name is Not Important, on September 3, 2021.
HU$H	2021	1	Multi-genre musician from Fairfield, Iowa, whom had previously worked with Tech N9ne on their collaborative EP BL1GHT. His signing was confirmed the following year, and he released his debut Strange Music LP, SKUNKWORKS, on May 12, 2023.
X-Raided	2022	1	Legendary rapper from Sacramento, California, whom alongside Brotha Lynch Hung was a member of the Black Market Records hip-hop collective in the 1990s. At Tech N9ne's ASIN9NE Red Rocks performance on May 1, 2022, X-Raided was brought back onto stage and announced as the newest member of the Strange Music roster.
Nnutthowze	2023	1	Rap collective from Kansas City, Missouri who Tech N9ne was affiliated with many years prior to the creation of Strange Music. Members include Tech N9ne, Zkeircrow & Phlaque The Grimstress. They released their debut EP, Signaling The Siqly, on October 31, 2023, after appearing on Tech's albums BLISS and Asin9ne.

=== Former artists ===
Artist	Year signed	Year left	Albums under Strange	Description
Project: Deadman	2004	2007	1	Hip-hop duo consisting of rapper Prozak and record producer Mike E. Clark. Released their only album Self Inflicted on July 13, 2004. The duo later disbanded, and Prozak would go on to sign to Strange Music as a solo artist in 2011, while Mike E. Clark would sign once again to Psychopathic Records in 2013.
Grave Plott	2008	2008	1	Rap duo consisting of rappers Liquid Assassin and Killa C. Released their only studio album under Strange Music, The Plott Thickens, in 2008. Their distribution deal with the label ended after Grave Plott split up in 2008.
Skatterman & Snug Brim	2004	2009	2	Rap duo from Kansas City, Missouri. They were the first group to be signed to the label. Prior to signing with the label, the duo has appeared as an album guest on Tech N9ne's fourth album along with then-future signees Krizz Kaliko and Kutt Calhoun. Both of them along with Tech N9ne also appeared as guests on their debut album also. Released their second studio album with Strange Music, Word on tha Streets, on August 12, 2008. On February 9, 2009, Tech N9ne's official website announced the duo's decision to leave the label after fulfilling their commitment.
Cognito	2009	2010	1	Rapper from Fairfield, California. Released his debut studio album with Strange Music, Automatic, on April 20, 2010. On December 5, 2010, via Ustream, Cognito announced his decision to leave Strange Music after fulfilling his commitment.
Young Bleed	2011	2012	1	Rapper from Baton Rouge, Louisiana. Released his fifth studio album, Preserved, on October 11, 2011, through Strange Music's subsidiary label Strange Lane Records. In early 2012, Young Bleed departed from the subsidiary after fulfilling his commitment.
Kutt Calhoun	2004	2014	4	Rapper from Kansas City, Missouri. He was the first artist, besides Tech N9ne, to be signed to the label. Prior to signing with the label, he appeared as an album guest on Tech N9ne's fourth album along with rapper/singer Krizz Kaliko and rap duo Skatterman & Snug Brim who would also eventually be signed to the label. Released his fourth studio album, Black Gold, on February 26, 2013. On September 22, 2014, it was announced that Kutt Calhoun left Strange Music after fulfilling his commitment. Out of all the artists to depart from the label so far, his departure was the most controversial due to the big part Kutt played in the label's beginning.
Jay Rock	2010	2014	1	Rapper from Watts, Los Angeles, California. Released his debut studio album, Follow Me Home, on July 26, 2011. In September 2014, Tech N9ne announced that Jay Rock left his Strange Music imprint and is now only signed to Top Dawg Entertainment.
Brotha Lynch Hung	2009	2015	3	Rapper from Sacramento, California. Had appeared as an album guest on Tech N9ne's fifth album and Grave Plott's only album prior to signing with the label. Released his third studio album with Strange Music, Mannibalector, on February 5, 2013. He departed the label in 2015. In 2017, he joined Tech and fellow Strange Music artists for the Strictly Strange Tour 2017.
Rittz	2012	2017	4	Rapper from Gwinnett County, Georgia. Had appeared as a guest on Krizz Kaliko's fourth album before signing to the label in August 2012. He signed a four-year album with Strange Music. After he released his fourth album Last Call with Strange Music, he departed with them and started his own label CNT Entertainment.
MURS	2014	2019	3	Rapper from South Central, Los Angeles, California. Had appeared as a guest on ¡MAYDAY!'s Strange Music debut album before signing to the label in February 2014. Released his third studio album with Strange Music, A Strange Journey Into the Unimaginable, on March 16, 2018. On March 9, 2019, Murs announced his decision to leave Strange Music after fulfilling his commitment.
Godemis	2019	2021	—N/a	Rapper originating from Kansas City, Missouri. Best known for being one half of the duo CES Cru. His departure was confirmed by Tech N9ne via Instagram in response to a fan on January 20, 2021.
Stevie Stone	2011	2021	6	Rapper from Columbia, Missouri. Tech N9ne had appeared as a guest on his debut album. Stone made guest appearances on Tech's tenth album, and Kutt Calhoun and Krizz Kaliko's third albums before officially signing with the label in early 2011. Released his fifth studio album with Strange Music, Black Lion, on August 7, 2020. In early 2021, Stone departed the label after fulfilling his commitment and started his own record label Ahdasee Records.
Darrein Safron	2015	2021	1	Singer and rapper from St. Louis, Missouri. Has appeared as a guest on Stevie Stone's second and third albums before signing to the label in the summer of 2015. With "Real With Yourself", Safron produced his first song under Strange Music with the help of Seven. The song featured Tech N9ne and appeared on his sixteenth album Strangeulation Vol. II. Released his debut EP titled "The Brilliant EP" on March 11, 2016. On March 18, 2021, Darrein officially announced his departure from the label in an interview.
JL	2015	2021	3	Rapper from Kansas City, Missouri. Tech N9ne and CES Cru had appeared on several of his solo projects. JL made guest appearances on CES Cru's debut album with Strange Music, Kutt Calhoun's first EP, and various Tech N9ne songs, including "Worldwide Choppers", before eventually signing to the label in 2015. Released his second and final Strange Music studio album, The Devil Hates Sundays, on September 25, 2020. In May 2021, it was announced by Tech N9ne in response to an Instagram comment that JL had departed the label.
Krizz Kaliko	2006	2021	7	Rapper and singer from Kansas City, Missouri. Best known for his collaborations with label mate Tech N9ne. He had first appeared as an album guest on Tech N9ne's fourth album released in 2002 along with then-future signees Kutt Calhoun and Skatterman & Snug Brim. He also appeared as an album guest on Skatterman & Snug Brim's first album along with Tech N9ne and Kutt Calhoun as well. He has also made numerous other guest appearances before releasing his debut album in 2008. Released his seventh studio album Legend on September 18, 2020. On May 15, 2021, it was announced during Kaliko's virtual concert event "The Reveal" that he had officially left Strange Music to form his own label Ear House Inc. with his wife Crystal.
CES Cru	2012	2021	3	Rap duo from Kansas City, Missouri. Consists of rappers Ubiquitous and Godemis. They have worked with Tech N9ne in the past prior to signing with the label. Released their third studio album with Strange Music, Catastrophic Event Specialists, on February 10, 2017. In 2021, both members have departed the label after fulfilling their commitment.
UBI	2018	2021	1	Rapper originating from Kansas City, Missouri. Best known for being one half of the duo CES Cru. Released his debut album, Under Bad Influence on July 26, 2019. On August 20, 2021, UBI officially announced all across social media that he had departed the label and released a new song titled "Y.K.T.G." independently on September 1 of the same year through his newly formed Commercial Entertainment Syndicate.
¡MAYDAY!	2011	2022	6	Hip-hop band from Miami, Florida. Consists of rappers Bernz and Wrekonize and percussionist NonMS. Former members include producer, keyboard player and guitarist Plex Luthor, drummer L T Hopkins and bassist Gianni Ca$h. Released their sixth studio album with Strange Music, Minute to Midnight, on March 19, 2021. On May 1, 2022, while performing at Red Rocks Park and Amphitheater for Tech N9ne's ASIN9NE tour, it was announced that ¡MAYDAY! have fulfilled their contract with Strange Music, but will remain being distributed by It Goes Up Entertainment with their new record label Mayday Music.
Wrekonize	2013	2022	3	Rapper originating from Miami, Florida (originally from London, England, UK). Best known for being one half of the rappers in hip-hop group ¡MAYDAY!. Released his third studio album with Strange Music, Pressure Point, on November 6, 2020. In 2022, he, as a member of ¡MAYDAY! completed his contract with Strange Music but will be distributed through It Goes Up with the band's new record label titled Mayday Music.
Bernz	2016	2022	2	Rapper originating from Miami, Florida. Best known for being one half of the rappers in hip-hop group ¡MAYDAY!. Made appearances on Wrekonize's debut Strange album, and CES Cru's second Strange album before signing to the label as a solo act in 2016. Released his second studio album Sorry for the Mess on December 4, 2020. On May 1, 2022, he along with Wrekonize and NonMS, have announced that they have completed their contract with Strange Music but will now on be distributed through It Goes Up under their new imprint Mayday Music.
¡MURSDAY!	2014	2022	1	Rap group merged by Strange Music artists, ¡MAYDAY! and MURS. Released their self-titled debut on June 10, 2014. Both acts are now no longer with the label which means that ¡MURSDAY! have officially left Strange Music.

== Discography ==
Year	Artist	Album
2001	Tech N9ne	Anghellic
2002	Tech N9ne	Absolute Power
2004	Skatterman & Snug Brim	Urban Legendz
2004	Project: Deadman	Self Inflicted
2004	Kutt Calhoun	B.L.E.V.E.
2006	Tech N9ne	Everready (The Religion)
2007	Tech N9ne Collabos	Misery Loves Kompany
2008	Krizz Kaliko	Vitiligo
2008	Grave Plott	The Plott Thickens
2008	Prozak	Tales from the Sick
2008	Tech N9ne	Killer
2008	Skatterman & Snug Brim	Word on tha Streets
2008	Kutt Calhoun	Feature Presentation
2009	Tech N9ne Collabos	Sickology 101
2009	Krizz Kaliko	Genius
2009	Big Scoob	Monsterifik
2009	Tech N9ne	K.O.D.
2010	Brotha Lynch Hung	Dinner and a Movie
2010	Cognito	Automatic
2010	Kutt Calhoun	Raw and Un-Kutt
2010	Tech N9ne Collabos	The Gates Mixed Plate
2010	Krizz Kaliko	Shock Treatment
2011	Brotha Lynch Hung	Coathanga Strangla
2011	Big Scoob	Damn Fool
2011	Tech N9ne	All 6's and 7's
2011	Jay Rock	Follow Me Home
2011	Young Bleed	Preserved
2011	Tech N9ne Collabos	Welcome to Strangeland
2012	¡MAYDAY!	Take Me to Your Leader
2012	Prozak	Paranormal
2012	Krizz Kaliko	Kickin' & Screamin'
2012	Stevie Stone	Rollin' Stone
2013	Brotha Lynch Hung	Mannibalector
2013	Kutt Calhoun	Black Gold
2013	CES Cru	Constant Energy Struggles
2013	Rittz	The Life and Times of Jonny Valiant
2013	Wrekonize	The War Within
2013	¡MAYDAY!	Believers
2013	Tech N9ne	Something Else
2013	Stevie Stone	2 Birds 1 Stone
2013	Krizz Kaliko	Son of Sam
2013	Prozak	We All Fall Down
2014	Tech N9ne Collabos	Strangeulation
2014	¡MAYDAY! & MURS	¡MURSDAY!
2014	CES Cru	Codename: Ego Stripper
2014	Rittz	Next to Nothing
2015	Tech N9ne	Special Effects
2015	MURS	Have a Nice Life
2015	Stevie Stone	Malta Bend
2015	¡MAYDAY!	Future Vintage
2015	Prozak	Black Ink
2015	Tech N9ne Collabos	Strangeulation Vol. II
2016	Krizz Kaliko	GO
2016	Rittz	Top of the Line
2016	Bernz	See You on the Other Side
2016	Big Scoob	H.O.G.
2016	Tech N9ne	The Storm
2017	CES Cru	Catastrophic Event Specialists
2017	MURS	Captain California
2017	Tech N9ne Collabos	Dominion
2017	Wrekonize	Into the Further
2017	Stevie Stone	Level Up
2017	JL	DIBKIS
2017	¡MAYDAY!	Search Party
2017	Rittz	Last Call
2017	Tech N9ne Collabos	Strange Reign
2018	Tech N9ne	Planet
2018	MURS	A Strange Journey Into the Unimaginable
2018	Mackenzie Nicole	The Edge
2018	Stevie Stone & JL	Kontra-Band
2018	Joey Cool	Joey Cool
2018	Big Scoob	Duality
2018	¡MAYDAY!	South of 5th
2019	Tech N9ne	N9NA
2019	Ubiquitous	Under Bad Influence
2019	Joey Cool	Old Habits Die Hard
2019	Above Waves	Fugitives
2019	Maez301	Maez301
2020	Mackenzie Nicole	Mystic
2020	King Iso	World War Me
2020	Tech N9ne	EnterFear
2020	Stevie Stone	Black Lion
2020	Jehry Robinson	20/Twenty
2020	Maez301	Hasaan
2020	Krizz Kaliko	Legend
2020	JL	The Devil Hates Sundays
2020	Joey Cool	Coolie High
2020	Wrekonize	Pressure Point
2020	Bernz	Sorry for the Mess
2021	¡MAYDAY!	Minute to Midnight
2021	Joey Cool	I Tried to Be Normal Once
2021	Jehry Robinson	The Name is Not Important
2021	Tech N9ne	ASIN9NE
2022	Maez301	Hello, Goodbye
2022	King Iso	Get Well Soon
2022	Joey Cool	The Chairman of the Board
2023	HU$H	SKUNKWORKS
2023	X-Raided	A Prayer in Hell
2023	Tech N9ne	Bliss
2023	Jehry Robinson	Drink More Water
2023	Joey Cool	Enjoy The View
2023	King Iso	iLLdren
2024	Tech N9ne Collabos	COSM (Class Of Strange Music)
2024	X-Raided	A Sin In Heaven
2024	Joey Cool	Roller Coaster
2025	Tech N9ne	5816 Forest
2025	King Iso	Ghetto Psycho
2025	Jehry Robinson	Hella Highwater
2025	X-Raided	A Prophecy in Purgatory
2026	Joey Cool	Time Will Tell

== See also ==
- List of record labels
