= Wrekonize =

American rapper

- Born: Benjamin Miller; 5 May 1983 (age 43); London, England
- Origin: Miami, Florida, U.S.
- Genres: Hip hop
- Occupations: Rapper; singer; songwriter; record producer
- Years active: 2001–present
- Labels: Strange Music; Mayday Music
- Member of: ¡Mayday!

Benjamin Miller (born 5 May 1983), better known by his stage name Wrekonize, is an American underground rapper and current member of Miami band ¡Mayday!. He is currently signed to the record label Mayday Music, after previously being signed to Tech N9ne's Strange Music.

== Early life ==
Benjamin Miller was born in London and raised in a household of both British and African descent. His mother was England-born and his father had immigrated to England from Cape Town, South Africa. After moving to Miami, Florida, in 1988, Miller's parents had formed a local band together. They performed on occasion with MC Guru for his original Jazzmatazz album. At the age of 11, Wrekonize was introduced to Guru, who helped inspire him to make his own music.

By the age of 13, Miller became involved in graffiti. Attempting to imitate the works of Miami graffiti artists Os Gêmeos, he spotted the term "Wrekonize" in Martha Cooper's Subway Art book. Admiring the graphic, Miller chose to adopt it as his stage name. Miller has stated that his stage name is intended to reflect the state of being "observant and always alert to the surroundings and the people in them".

== Musical career ==
In his early career, Wrekonize performed as a battle rapper. He competed in MTV Battle II: The Takeover in Times Square in 2003, beating ten other rappers to become the winner. Though Wrekonize was promised a record deal with Roc-A-Fella Records as a grand prize, it was reported several months later that Wrekonize had never been offered a contract. Soon afterward, he signed to SouthBeat Records, where he released a mixtape titled The Waiting Room. The Waiting Room was planned to be the first mixtape to a three-part series he planned to release through Southbeat Records. With the subsequent fall of the label, the album had minimal publicity on its release, but it later resurfaced on the underground hip hop database DatPiff as an album of the week. After the online success of the first album, Wrekonize self-produced a second installment called Elevator Music. During this period, Wrekonize also collaborated with ¡Mayday!, a Miami-based hip hop band and fellow SouthBeat Records signee.

Eventually, ¡Mayday! offered Wrekonize full-time membership in the band as a vocalist. In 2010, Wrekonize released Stuck on an Island, his first album with ¡Mayday!, as well as a solo album called A Soiree For Skeptics. After ¡Mayday! signed with Strange Music in 2011, the band released the Take Me To Your Leader album, the Thrift Store Halos EP, and the Smash & Grab mixtape in 2012; Wrekonize also completed the Waiting Room mixtape trilogy that year by releasing the Rooftops Mixtape. Wrekonize remained signed to Strange Music until 2022; during this period, he released three solo albums and participated on five additional ¡Mayday! albums through the label as well as a collaboration album with rapper MURS titled ¡MURSDAY! Wrekonize has also produced various freestyles via numerous blogs and web sites.

== Discography ==
=== Studio albums ===
List of albums, with selected chart positions
Title	Album details	Peak chart positions		
Title	Album details	US	US R&B	US Rap
A Soiree For Skeptics	Released: 30 August 2010; Label: Baggins Family Produce; Format: CD, digital download	–	—	—
The War Within	Released: 25 June 2013; Label: Strange Music; Format: CD, digital download	88	27	5
Into the Further	Released: 5 May 2017; Label: Strange Music; Format: CD, digital download	–	—	—
Pressure Point	Released: 6 November 2020; Label: Strange Music; Format: CD, digital download	–	—	—
Edited for Reality	Released: 26 June 2026; Label: Sunrise to Sunset, Inc.; Format: CD, digital download	–	—	—

"—" denotes a title that did not chart, or was not released in that territory.

=== Collaboration albums ===
List of albums, with selected chart positions
Title	Album details	Peak chart positions		
Title	Album details	US	US R&B	US Rap
Stuck on an Island (with ¡Mayday!)	Released: 12 October 2010; Label: Mayday Music; Format: CD, Digital download	–	—	—
Take Me to Your Leader (with ¡Mayday!)	Released: 26 March 2012; Label: Strange Music; Format: CD, Digital download	86	18	15
Believers (with ¡Mayday!)	Released: 16 July 2013; Label: Strange Music; Format: CD, Digital download	75	19	11
¡MursDay! (with ¡Mayday! & Murs)	Released: 10 June 2014; Label: Strange Music; Format: CD, Digital download	45	–	4
Future Vintage (with ¡Mayday!)	Released: 18 September 2015; Label: Strange Music; Format: CD, Digital download	112	9	8
Search Party (with ¡Mayday!)	Released: September 8, 2017; Label: Strange Music; Format: CD, Digital download	—	—	—
South of 5th (with ¡Mayday!)	Released: September 7, 2018; Label: Strange Music; Format: CD, Digital download	—	—	—
Minute to Midnight (with ¡Mayday!)	Released: March 19, 2021; Label: Strange Music; Format: CD, Digital download	—	—	—
Justus (with ¡Mayday!)	Released: March 18, 2025; Label: Mayday Music; Format: CD, Digital download	—	—	—
"—" denotes a title that did not chart, or was not released in that territory.
