= All 6's and 7's =

Studio album by Tech N9ne
- Released: June 7, 2011
- Recorded: 2009–2011
- Genre: Hardcore hip-hop
- Length: 76:31
- Label: Strange Music
- Producers: Ben Cybulsky; David Sanders II; B.o.B.; Mike Dupree; Jayson "Koko" Bridges; J.U.S.T.I.C.E. League; Seven; Soleternity; Travis O'Guin (exec.); WLPWR; Wyshmaster

Tech N9ne chronology
Bad Season (2010)	All 6's and 7's (2011)	Welcome to Strangeland (2011)

Singles from All 6's and 7's
- 1. "He's a Mental Giant" Released: May 4, 2011; 2. "Mama Nem" Released: May 8, 2011; 3. "Worldwide Choppers" Released: May 31, 2011; 4. "Love Me Tomorrow" Released: 2011; 5. "Am I a Psycho?" Released: January 22, 2012

All 6's and 7's is the eleventh studio album by American rapper Tech N9ne. It was released on June 7, 2011, through Strange Music. The album was released to universal acclaim by music critics, and peaked at number four on the Billboard 200 and at number one on the Top R&B/Hip-Hop Albums charts.

== Background ==
Tech stated that the album title All 6's and 7's means "in a state of confusion and disarray." He also said that this will be his "biggest" and "craziest" album of all. The album would feature guest appearances from B.o.B, Hopsin, Yelawolf, Snoop Dogg, Jay Rock, Twista, T-Pain, Lil Wayne, E-40, Busta Rhymes and Kendrick Lamar, among others. Tech had expressed an interest in collaborating with Nicki Minaj, Janelle Monáe and Tyler, the Creator. Eminem was initially set to appear on the track "So Lonely", but was unable to record his verse in time before the album's official release.

== Promotion ==
The first official single, "He's a Mental Giant" was released and was premiered through Shade 45. It was produced by Seven and the music video premiered on May 29, 2011 on MTV2. "Mama Nem", featuring Krizz Kaliko, was the second song released. It was produced by David Sanders II and was premiered as a music video on MTV2. "Worldwide Choppers", was the third song to be released featuring Yelawolf, Busta Rhymes, Twista, Ceza, JL of B. Hood, U$O, D-Loc and Twisted Insane. It debuted on the US Bubbling Under Hot 100 Singles chart at number four and on the Top Heatseekers chart at number 15.

A music video for "Am I a Psycho?" was said by Hopsin on Facebook that it was currently in the making with him, Tech N9ne, and B.o.B. Funk Volume head Damien 'Dame' Ritter confirmed on November 24 that filming would take place during the last week of November. The music video for "Am I a Psycho?" was finished filming on December 1 and aired first on January 22, 2012 on MTV.

Upon the album's release, "Fuck Food" featuring Krizz Kaliko, Lil Wayne and T-Pain debuted at number 47 on the Rap Digital Songs chart.

=== Tour ===
A tour for the album, "All 6's and 7's: The Tour", began on May 26, 2011 in Seattle, Washington. The tour had 62 shows. Fellow Strange Music artists Big Scoob, Jay Rock, Krizz Kaliko, Kutt Calhoun, ¡Mayday! and Stevie Stone served as supporting acts for the tour. Irv Da Phenom was a surprise guest.

== Critical reception ==
Professional ratings
Aggregate scores
Source	Rating
Metacritic	81/100
Review scores
Source	Rating
411Mania	(9/10)
AllMusic	4/5 stars
Artistdirect	5/5 stars
DJBooth	4/5 stars
HipHopDX	4/5 stars
One Thirty BPM	(74%)
The Kansas City Star / Ink	(Favorable)
RapReviews	(8/10)
Spin	(7/10)
XXL	(XL)

All 6's and 7's received universal acclaim from critics. At Metacritic, which assigns a normalized rating out of 100 to reviews from mainstream publications, the album received an average score of 81, based on seven reviews. David Jeffries of AllMusic said, "Gimmicks abound on this dark carnival of an album, and if you can't hang with some murder talk and misogyny, it's best to stay away, but this fat, epic effort is still a swift thrill ride and doesn't bore despite its size." Nathan S. of DJBooth said, "6's & 7's is a hard album to deliver a final verdict. It's an album that was made for a very specific group, everyone else be damned, and so while I honestly can't say I'm a full fledged Techaholic, I do have to acknowledge that for many this album will be nothing short of epic."

Andres Vasquez of HipHopDX stated "All 6's and 7's doesn't disappoint as a well-balanced offering." Steve Juon of RapReviews.com said, "Tech has done everything in his power to reach out to the broadest fan base on All 6's and 7's by keeping it real and giving you something you can feel at the same time." Mosi Reeves of Spin said, "All 6's and 7's is an admirable attempt at balancing Tech's heavy-metal rep and hard-won maturity." Adam Fleischer of XXL said, "The album is the first test of Tech's ability to balance his new industry connections with the distinct style that his Technicians have become accustomed to over the years. Luckily, he reaches that marker without any real stumbles along the way."

== Commercial performance ==
All 6's and 7's debuted at number four on the US Billboard 200 with 56,000 copies sold in its first week.

== Track listing ==
No.	Title	Writer(s)	Producer(s)	Length
1.	"The Pledge (Intro)"	Aaron Yates	Ben Cybulsky, Anthony Smith	0:43
2.	"Technicians"	Christopher McGill; Yates	Soleternity	3:52
3.	"Military (Skit)"	Yates	Ben Cybulsky	0:22
4.	"Am I a Psycho?" (featuring B.o.B. and Hopsin)	Bobby Simmons, Jr.; Marcus Hopson; Yates	B.o.B., Anthony Smith	4:04
5.	"He's A Mental Giant"	Michael Summers; Samuel Watson; Yates	Seven	3:54
6.	"Worldwide Choppers" (featuring Ceza, JL B.Hood, USO, Yelawolf, Twista, Busta Rhymes, D-Loc and Twisted Insane)	Ausamah Saed; Bilgin Özçalkan; Carl Mitchell; Demario Epps; Jason Varnes; Michael Johnson; Michael Atha; Summers; Trevor Smith; Yates	Seven, Anthony Smith	5:26
7.	"We Miss You Man Man (Skit)"	Yates	Anthony Smith	0:46
8.	"I Love Music" (featuring Kendrick Lamar and Oobergeek)	Kendrick Duckworth; Marcus Yates; Michael Dupree; Watson; Yates	Mike Dupree	3:47
9.	"Strangeland"	Erik Ortiz, Kevin Crowe; Yates	J.U.S.T.I.C.E. League	3:35
10.	"Call From Richie (Skit)"	Richie Abbott	Ben Cybulsky	0:34
11.	"The Boogieman" (featuring First Degree the D.E. and Stokley Williams of Mint Condition)	Crowe; Manzilla Queen; Michael Colen; Ortiz; Stokley Williams; Yates	J.U.S.T.I.C.E. League	3:51
12.	"Cult Leader" (featuring Liz Suwandi)	Elizabeth Arnold; Summers; Yates	Anthony Smith	4:47
13.	"Call From KC Poet Camile (Skit)"	Camile Venable	Ben Cybulsky	0:59
14.	"Fuck Food" (featuring Lil Wayne, T-Pain and Krizz Kaliko)	Dwayne Carter, Jr.; Faheem Najm; Summers; Yates	Anthony Smith	4:55
15.	"Overtime" (featuring Stevie Stone and Krizz Kaliko)	Jayson "Koko" Bridges; Stephen Williams; Watson; Yates	Bridges	3:01
16.	"Pornographic" (featuring Snoop Dogg, E-40 and Krizz Kaliko)	Calvin Broadus, Jr.; Earl Stevens; Summers; Watson; Yates	Seven	3:53
17.	"You Owe Like Pookie" (featuring Jay Rock and Kutt Calhoun)	Johnnie McKenzie; Melvin Calhoun, Jr.; Summers; Yates	Seven	3:29
18.	"Delusional" (featuring Nikkiya Brooks)	Watson; William Washington; Yates	WLPWR	4:13
19.	"So Lonely" (featuring Blind Fury and Mackenzie Nicole)	Adam Cherrington; Mackenzie O'Guin; Stephen Norris; Yates	Wyshmaster	3:54
20.	"If I Could" (featuring Chino Moreno and Stephen Carpenter of Deftones)	Summers; Watson; Yates	Seven	3:28
21.	"Angry Caller (Skit)"		Ben Cybulsky	0:20
22.	"Love Me Tomorrow" (featuring Big Scoob and Krizz Kaliko)	Queen; Stewart Ashby; Summers; Yates	Seven	3:44
23.	"Mama Nem" (featuring Krizz Kaliko)	David Sanders II; Watson; Yates	Sanders II	4:23
24.	"Promiseland" (featuring Nikkiya Brooks)	Cherrington; Nikkiya Brooks; Yates	Wyshmaster	4:41
Total length:				76:31

iTunes deluxe edition (bonus tracks)
No.	Title	Producer(s)	Length
25.	"Eenie Meanie Miny Ho" (featuring Krizz Kaliko and Wide Frame)	Wyshmaster	3:38
26.	"This is Hip Hop" (featuring Brotha Lynch Hung)	NonStop	3:41
27.	"Ya Killin Me" (featuring Pill)	Young Fyre, Karbon	3:21
28.	"Behind the Scenes: The Making of All 6's and 7's" (video)		21:28

Best Buy exclusive deluxe edition (bonus tracks)
No.	Title	Producer(s)	Length
25.	"Face Paint"		3:21
26.	"Give It Up" (featuring Lebowski and Ces Cru)		5:08
27.	"Rock & Roll Nigga"	Mike Dupree	4:08

Strange Music Store pre-order digital bonus track
No.	Title	Producer(s)	Length
25.	"F.A.N.S. (Forever Accepting N9ne's Soul)"	Seven	5:09

== Charts ==
=== Weekly charts ===
Chart (2011)	Peak position
Canadian Albums (Billboard)	24
US Billboard 200	4
US Independent Albums (Billboard)	1
US Top Album Sales (Billboard)	4
US Top R&B/Hip-Hop Albums (Billboard)	1

=== Year-end charts ===
Chart (2011)	Position
US Top R&B/Hip-Hop Albums (Billboard)	49
Chart (2012)	Position
US Top R&B/Hip-Hop Albums (Billboard)	88
