= Shock Treatment (Krizz Kaliko album) =

Studio album by Krizz Kaliko
- Released: September 14, 2010
- Genre: Alternative hip hop; R&B
- Length: 58:26
- Label: Strange Music
- Producer: David Sanders II; Jonah "Matic Lee" Appleby; Lonard "Nardo" Young; OGTha3; Robert Rebeck; Seven; Trox; Wyshmaster; Young Fyre

Krizz Kaliko chronology
Genius (2009)	Shock Treatment (2010)	Kickin' and Screamin' (2012)

Singles from Shock Treatment
- 1. "Elevator" Released: August 24, 2010; 2. "Get Around" Released: August 24, 2010

Professional ratings
Review scores
Source	Rating
AllMusic	3/5 stars

Shock Treatment is the third studio album by American rapper Krizz Kaliko. It was released on September 14, 2010 via Strange Music. Other titles the artist considered for the album, before deciding on Shock Treatment, were Son of Sam and Walk on Water.

Production was handled by Seven, Wyshmaster, Oliver "OG" Grose, David Sanders II, Jonah "Matic Lee" Appleby, Lonard "Nardo" Young, Robert Rebeck, Trox and Young Fyre, with Krizz Kaliko and Josh "Karbon" Brunstetter serving as additional producers. It features guest appearances from Irv Da Phenom, Barbara Word, Big Ben, Big Scoob, Brotha Lynch Hung, Kortney Leveringston and Stevie Stone, as well as his 816 Boyz groupmates Tech N9ne, Kutt Calhoun and Makzilla.

The album debuted at number 97 on the Billboard 200, number 17 on the Top R&B/Hip-Hop Albums, number 7 on the Top Rap Albums and number 20 on the Independent Albums charts in the United States.

== Track listing ==
No.	Title	Writer(s)	Producer(s)	Length
1.	"Shock Treatment (Intro)"	Samuel Watson	Robert Rebeck	1:13
2.	"Simon Says" (featuring Tech N9NE)	Watson; Aaron D. Yates	Seven; Krizz Kaliko (add.)	3:31
3.	"Hard Core" (featuring Stevie Stone)	Watson; Stephen Williams	David Sanders II	4:31
4.	"Get Around" (featuring Tech N9NE)	Watson; Yates	OGTha3	3:05
5.	"Elevator" (featuring Tech N9NE)	Watson; Yates	Seven; Krizz Kaliko (add.)	2:40
6.	"Skally Wag"	Watson	Trox	3:51
7.	"Stripper Dance" (featuring Kortney Leveringston)	Watson; Manzilla Marquis Queen	Seven	3:51
8.	"Get It Girl" (featuring Irv Da Phenom)	Watson; Mitchell Irving Jr.	Seven; Krizz Kaliko (add.)	3:54
9.	"One of Them Ones" (featuring Big Ben)	Watson; Benjamin Olney	Young Fyre; Karbon (add.)	4:30
10.	"All Gas No Brakes" (performed by 816 Boyz)	Watson; Yates; Melvin Calhoun Jr.; Queen	OGTha3	4:07
11.	"Get Active" (featuring Irv Da Phenom)	Watson; Irving Jr.	Seven	2:50
12.	"Freaks" (featuring Tech N9NE)	Watson; Yates	Seven; Krizz Kaliko (add.)	3:17
13.	"Rejection"	Watson	Lonard "Nardo" Young	2:51
14.	"Ack-A-Donkey" (featuring Kutt Calhoun)	Watson; Calhoun Jr.	Wyshmaster	3:10
15.	"In My Dreams" (featuring Brotha Lynch Hung, Big Scoob and Barbara Word)	Watson; Kevin Mann; Stewart D. Ashby Jr.	Wyshmaster	4:16
16.	"Alive"	Watson	Wyshmaster	3:04
17.	"Stand By"	Watson	Jonah "Matic Lee" Appleby	3:45
Total length:				58:26

Strange Music pre-order digital bonus track
No.	Title	Producer(s)	Length
18.	"Tonight" (featuring Kutt Calhoun and Tech N9NE)	Wyshmaster	4:08

== Personnel ==
- Samuel "Krizz Kaliko" Watson — vocals, additional producer (tracks: 2, 5, 8, 12)
- Robert Rebeck — additional vocals & producer (track 1), mixing
- Aaron "Tech N9NE" Yates — additional vocals (tracks: 2, 4, 5, 10, 12), A&R
- Crystal Watson — additional vocals (tracks: 2, 5, 7, 16)
- Stephen "Stevie Stone" Williams — additional vocals (track 3)
- Christopher Watson Jr. — additional vocals (track 3)
- Kortney Leveringston — additional vocals (tracks: 4, 7, 8)
- MyLinh Chau — additional vocals (tracks: 7, 17)
- Mitchell "Irv Da Phenom" Irving Jr. — additional vocals (tracks: 8, 11)
- Benjamin "Big Ben" Olney — additional vocals (track 9)
- Melvin "Kutt Calhoun" Calhoun Jr. — additional vocals (tracks: 10, 14)
- Kevin "Brotha Lynch Hung" Mann — additional vocals (track 15)
- Stewart D. "Big Scoob" Ashby Jr. — additional vocals (track 15)
- Barbara J. Word — additional vocals (track 15)
- Jace Wilbert — guitars (track 11)
- Michael "Seven" Summers — producer (tracks: 2, 5, 7, 8, 11, 12)
- David Sanders II — producer (track 3)
- Oliver "OG" Grose III — producer (tracks: 4, 10)
- Samuel Troxel — producer (track 6)
- Tramaine "Young Fyre" Winfrey — producer (track 9)
- Lonard "Nardo" Young — producer (track 13)
- Adam "Wyshmaster" Cherrington — producer (tracks: 14–16)
- Jonah "Matic Lee" Appleby — producer (track 17)
- Josh "Karbon" Brunstetter — additional producer (track 9)
- Tom Baker — mastering
- Travis O'Guin — executive producer, A&R
- Gabe Hopkins — photography

== Charts ==
Chart (2010)	Peak position
US Billboard 200	97
US Top R&B/Hip-Hop Albums (Billboard)	17
US Top Rap Albums (Billboard)	7
US Independent Albums (Billboard)	20
