= Genius (Krizz Kaliko album) =

Studio album by Krizz Kaliko
- Released: July 14, 2009
- Genre: Hip-hop
- Label: Strange Music
- Producer: Jonah "Matic Lee" Appleby; Karbon; Q-Rock; Robert Rebeck; Seven; Wyshmaster; Young Fyre

Krizz Kaliko chronology
| Vitiligo (2008) | Genius (2009) | Shock Treatment (2010) |

Singles from Genius
- 1. "Misunderstood" Released: June 30, 2009; 2. "Back Pack" Released: June 30, 2009; 3. "Happy Birthday" Released: June 30, 2009

Professional ratings
Review scores
| Source | Rating |
|---|---|
| AllMusic | 4/5 stars |
| HipHopDX | 3/5 |
| RapReviews | 7/10 |

Genius is the second studio album by American rapper Krizz Kaliko. It was released on July 14, 2009 via Strange Music. Production was handled by Jonah "Matic Lee" Appleby, Michael "Seven" Summers, Young Fyre, Wyshmaster, Robert Rebeck, Karbon and Q-Rock. It features guest appearances from Tech N9ne, Kutt Calhoun, Big Scoob, DJ Chill, E-40, Skatterman & Snug Brim.

On July 7, 2009, a music video for the single "Misunderstood" was released on the Strange Music YouTube account.

When discussing the song "Misunderstood" in an interview, Krizz revealed the inspiration behind the production of the song. The idea struck him while watching an infomercial for the 1960s show, The Munsters. He called up the producer, Michael Summers, and told him to "youtube the Munsters theme song, then call me back and I'll tell you how to do this beat". He notes that several of the instruments used to construct the beat are the same used to compose the Munsters theme.

In the United States, the album debuted at number 85 on the Billboard 200, number 14 on the Top R&B/Hip-Hop Albums, number 3 on the Top Rap Albums and number 12 on the Independent Albums, selling 5,300 units in its first-week.

== Track listing ==
| No. | Title | Writer(s) | Producer(s) | Length |
|---|---|---|---|---|
| 1. | "Intro" | Samuel Watson | Robert Rebeck | 0:18 |
| 2. | "Chip on My Shoulder" | Watson | Seven; Krizz Kaliko | 2:11 |
| 3. | "Genius" | Watson; Aaron D. Yates | Jonah "Matic Lee" Appleby | 2:52 |
| 4. | "Back Pack" | Watson; Manzilla Queen | Wyshmaster | 3:38 |
| 5. | "Doe Doe" (featuring E-40) | Watson; Earl Stevens | Jonah "Matic Lee" Appleby | 4:30 |
| 6. | "Get Off" (featuring Tech N9ne) | Watson; Yates | Jonah "Matic Lee" Appleby | 3:58 |
| 7. | "Butt Naked Fun" | Watson; Queen | Seven; Krizz Kaliko | 2:53 |
| 8. | "Getcha Life Right" (featuring Skatterman & Snug Brim) | Watson; Stacy Landis; Aaron Henderson | Young Fyre; Karbon | 4:40 |
| 9. | "Love You 2 Death" | Watson; Queen | Jonah "Matic Lee" Appleby | 3:59 |
| 10. | "Misunderstood" | Watson | Seven; Krizz Kaliko | 2:49 |
| 11. | "Bipolar" | Watson | Young Fyre; Tech N9ne | 4:03 |
| 12. | "Dead Wrong" | Watson | Jonah "Matic Lee" Appleby | 2:25 |
| 13. | "So High" (featuring Tech N9ne & Kutt Calhoun) | Watson; Yates; Melvin Calhoun | Matic Lee | 3:10 |
| 14. | "The Chemical" | Watson | Seven; Krizz Kaliko; Robert Rebeck | 2:38 |
| 15. | "She'll Do" (featuring Kutt Calhoun & DJ Chill) | Watson; Calhoun; Steven Mitchell | Young Fyre; Q-Rock | 3:18 |
| 16. | "Be Right Back" (featuring Tech N9ne & Big Scoob) | Watson; Yates; Stewart D. Ashby Jr. | Wyshmaster | 3:52 |
| 17. | "Hum Drum" (featuring Tech N9ne) | Watson; Yates | Seven; Krizz Kaliko | 2:44 |
| 18. | "Happy Birthday" (featuring Tech N9ne) | Watson; Yates | Wyshmaster | 4:21 |
| 19. | "Choir Boy" | Watson; Queen | Jonah "Matic Lee" Appleby | 2:34 |
| 20. | "Outro" | Watson | Robert Rebeck | 0:26 |
| 21. | "Yeah Bitch" | | Young Fyre; Karbon | 2:28 |

Notes

- Track 21 is a free digital bonus track available at Strange Music pre-order.

== Charts ==
| Chart (2009) | Peak position |
|---|---|
| US Billboard 200 | 85 |
| US Top R&B/Hip-Hop Albums (Billboard) | 14 |
| US Top Rap Albums (Billboard) | 3 |
| US Independent Albums (Billboard) | 12 |
