= Worldwide Choppers =

2011 single by Tech N9ne featuring multiple artists

Single by Tech N9ne featuring Busta Rhymes, Ceza, D-Loc, JL B.Hood, Twista, Twisted Insane, U$O and Yelawolf

from the album All 6's and 7's
- Released: May 31, 2011
- Recorded: 2011
- Genre: Hip hop; hardcore hip hop; Midwest hip-hop; rap rock; chopper
- Length: 5:26
- Label: Strange Music
- Songwriters: Aaron Yates; Trevor Smith Jr.; Bilgin Özçalkan; Carl Mitchell; Demario Epps; Jason Varnes; Michael Johnson; Ausamah Saed; Michael Atha; Michael Summers
- Producer: Seven

Tech N9ne singles chronology
"Mama Nem" (2011)	"Worldwide Choppers" (2011)	"Love Me Tomorrow" (2011)

Busta Rhymes singles chronology
"Welcome to My Hood (Remix)" (2011)	"Worldwide Choppers" (2011)	"Why Stop Now" (2011)

Twista singles chronology
"Welcome to My Hood (Remix)" (2011)	"Worldwide Choppers" (2011)	"Taste the Good" (2012)

Yelawolf singles chronology
"Daddy's Lambo" (2010)	"Worldwide Choppers" (2011)	"Hard White (Up In The Club)" (2011)

"Worldwide Choppers" is a song by American rapper Tech N9ne. It serves as the third single from his eleventh studio album All 6's and 7's. The song is noted for its breakneck flows packing rhythmic, rapid-fire rap.

"Worldwide Choppers", produced by Michael Summers known as producer Seven, is a multilingual track that includes lyrics in English, Danish and Turkish. Turkish lyrics are performed by Turkish rapper Ceza and Danish lyrics are performed by Danish rapper U$O. Other rappers taking part in the single are Busta Rhymes, Yelawolf, Twista, D-Loc, JL of B.Hood & Twisted Insane.

It was recorded with contributions from a number of locations, more specifically Kansas City, Missouri (JL), Kansas City, Kansas (D-Loc), Alabama (Yelawolf), Chicago (Twista), New York (Busta Rhymes), California (Twisted Insane) in addition to Turkey (Ceza) and Denmark (U$O). The names of the rappers and their locations are introduced within the recording by name.

== Context ==
The word "chopper" relates to a type of fast-paced rap, a style of Midwest hip hop called chopper. In the late 1990s, Tech N9ne popularized the chopper style among his fan base. From 2007 to 2011, he released a number of songs in collaboration with other chopper-style artists exclusively in this fast-paced style of rap, including "Midwest Choppers" featuring the Midwest rappers D-Loc, Dalima and Krizz Kaliko (from his 2007 album Misery Loves Kompany) and "Midwest Choppers 2" featuring K-Dean and Krayzie Bone (from his 2009 album Sickology 101). "Worldwide Choppers" became the third song in this series.

== Music video ==
Tech N9ne and Yelawolf claimed in interviews that a music video was being shot for the song, but the video never entered production. This was due to the difficulty of having such a large group of artists available to film at the same time.

== Sequel ==
A sequel titled "Speedom (WWC2)" is on Tech N9ne's album called Special Effects. The song features guest vocals from Krizz Kaliko and Eminem.

== Chart performance ==
The single debuted on the US Billboard's Bubbling Under Hot 100 Singles chart at number 4, effectively making it at number 104 on the US Billboard Hot 100. The song also appeared on the US Billboard's Heatseekers Songs chart at number 15, becoming U$O's, Ceza's, JL's, Yelawolf's and Twisted Insane's biggest hit in the United States.

== Charts ==
Chart performance for "Worldwide Choppers"
Chart (2011)	Peak position
US Bubbling Under Hot 100 (Billboard)	4
US Heatseekers Songs (Billboard)	12

== Certifications ==
Certifications for "Worldwide Choppers"
Region	Certification	Certified units/sales
United States (RIAA)	Platinum	1,000,000^{‡}
^{‡} Sales+streaming figures based on certification alone.
