= Dysfunctional (Tech N9ne song) =

Song by Tech N9ne featuring Big Scoob and Krizz Kaliko

from the album Sickology 101
- Released: April 28, 2009
- Genre: Hip-hop
- Length: 4:00
- Label: Strange Music
- Songwriter(s): Aaron Yates; Samuel Watson IV; Stewart Ashby Jr.; Jonah Appleby
- Producer(s): Matic Lee

"Dysfunctional" is a song by American rapper Tech N9ne. It was released on April 28, 2009, as the thirteenth track from his eighth studio album Sickology 101. Produced by Matic Lee, it features fellow Strange Music labelmates Krizz Kaliko and Big Scoob.

== Critical reception ==
Darren Jamison of Singersroom.com ranked the song at number eight on their list of Tech N9ne's best songs, calling it "a hard-hitting track that showcases Tech N9ne’s unique style and lyrical abilities".

== Live performance ==
Tech and Krizz performed the song at NPR's Tiny Desk Concert on August 28, 2018.

== Personnel ==
Credits adapted from Apple Music.

- Tech N9ne – vocals, songwriter
- Krizz Kaliko – vocals, songwriter
- Big Scoob – vocals, songwriter
- Matic Lee – producer, songwriter
- Robert Rebeck – mixing engineer
- Tom Baker – mastering engineer

== Certifications ==
Certifications for "Dysfunctional"
Region	Certification	Certified units/sales
New Zealand (RMNZ)	Gold	15,000^{‡}
United States (RIAA)	Gold	500,000^{‡}
^{‡} Sales+streaming figures based on certification alone.
