= Why Stop Now =

Why Stop Now may refer to:

- Why Stop Now (film), a 2012 American comedy-drama film
- Why Stop Now, a 2009 album by Minnie Minoprio
- "Why Stop Now" (Busta Rhymes song), a 2011 song
