= Soleternity =

American record producer

Christopher "Soleternity" McGill
- Born: July 10, 1986 (age 40); Rockford, IL, United States
- Education: Yale University (B.A.); Rock Valley College (A.A.)
- Occupations: Record Producer, Music Composer, Mix Engineer
- Years active: 2001–present
- Website: soleternity.com

Christopher McGill, professionally known as Soleternity, is a record producer, music composer, and mix engineer from Rockford, Illinois.

He has produced music for recording artists including Snoop Dogg, Tech N9ne, Bone Crusher, Young Buck, Nappy Roots, Paul Wall, Angie Stone, Adina Howard, Bun B, Lloyd, 8ball, Bizzy Bone, Webbie, Pastor Troy, Ray J, Parlae of Dem Franchize Boyz, Saigon, Joe Budden, Lil Scrappy, Krizz Kaliko, The Outlawz, J-Bo of the YoungbloodZ, ELDee, Jarren Benton, and Khujo Goodie of Goodie Mob.

He has also worked with hundreds of independent recording artists and record labels including Def Jam Recordings, Strange Music, Jive Records, Arista Records, Evander Holyfield's East South Records, Roy Jones, Jr's Body Head Entertainment, Ricky Watters's Tigero Entertainment, Koch Records and EMI Records.

== Work with Snoop Dogg & Stevie J ==
Soleternity produced the song "DNA" by Snoop Dogg and Stevie J for Vh1's Love & Hip Hop: Atlanta compilation album released by Def Jam Recordings on August 19, 2014. The song appeared multiple times in episode 16 of season 3 of VH1's Love & Hip Hop: Atlanta, including a segment that shows Snoop Dogg recording his vocals for the song.

Soleternity performed the instrumental to "DNA" during an iStandard Chicago Producer Showcase on December 9, 2010. Soleternity won the showcase and connected with Rhythm J of iStandard, who facilitated placing the "DNA" beat with Stevie J.

== Work with Strange Music ==
Soleternity produced the song "Technicians" for Tech N9ne's chart topping 2011 album All 6's and 7's. "Technicians" combines Tech N9ne's intense, rapid-fire vocal performance style with a dubstep-hip hop hybrid instrumental from Soleternity.

Soleternity first created music for Tech N9ne's record label Strange Music in 2007 when he produced the song "Crew Cut" by Krizz Kaliko, BG Bulletwound, Kutt Calhoun, Skatterman & Snugbrim, and Tech N9ne, for Krizz Kaliko's album Vitiligo.

Soleternity and Krizz Kaliko also worked together on Krizz Kaliko's "S.I.C." EP album released in 2011, which contains the Soleternity-produced songs "Down (Featuring Tech N9ne)" and "Rain Dance." Soleternity discussed his work with Strange Music in an hour-long interview for the Strange Music podcast on February 27, 2012.

== Work with Bone Crusher, Khujo Goodie ==
In 2006, Soleternity produced and mixed eight songs on Bone Crusher's Billboard top 100 album Release The Beast, including the album's lead single, "Southern Gorillaz."

During this same time period Soleternity produced and mixed three songs on Khujo Goodie's album "Mercury," released by Koch Records.

== Additional Career Notes ==
Since 2001, Soleternity has produced independent, underground, and unreleased songs featuring Major Label artists including Young Buck, Nappy Roots, Paul Wall, Angie Stone, Adina Howard, Bun B, Lloyd, 8ball, Bizzy Bone, Webbie, Pastor Troy, Ray J, Parlae of Dem Franchize Boyz, Saigon, Joe Budden, Lil Scrappy, The Outlawz, J-Bo of the YoungbloodZ, ELDee, and Jarren Benton.

Soleternity has produced for independent artists including 2xplicit, A.B. aka Peter Blue, Alfonzo, Amanda Badze, ANT, Anthony V. Hiltz, Babylon Renigg, Beezle, Bettie Grind, Black Soultan, Blake Banks, C. Breeze, City Block, Chris V, Cottin Mouf, Cyrano, D. Dolo, Da One Irie B, Daniel Robati, Don Cerino, Dreek, DVS Dee, Dyme, Dynamix, Enfinitti, Enfo, Epiphany, ET aka Lil Sandman, Fariborz Pakseresht, Felicia Alima, Finesse Starz, Fiyaboy, Fonk Rockwell, Frank Lee White, George Moss, Gravity, G-Money, Heat Scalese, Ike, Imani Walker, Instant Legend, Insufficient Funds, Iverlei, Kle, Gabrielle Pippo, Garrick Jones, Jack Knife, Jamia Simone Nash, Jamie McNeill, Jeremy Santacrose, John Calwile, Kensean Terry, Ken Fluid, Kevin Sturman, Kinfolk, Kyle Mixan, Loch, Loose Logic, Lord Ganjah, Lyrico, Lyrycyst, Manaj, Main Man, Marley High, Maskerade, Medusa, Michael Fugutti, Mighty, Mistaken Identity, Money, Moreno, Ness Lee, NoCanDo, Okwerdz, Oladele, Orange Pen, Pair-A-Dice, Phact, PNC, Prince Ice, Rare Blend, Raskal, Rezzo, Richard Moore, Riri, Sage Richly, Sanat kumara, Scott Gilmour, Sean Falyon, Sky, Smitty Jankins, Stu Holdren, Terrea Cosby, Tha E.D., Terock, Tiko, Too Much, Toya, Trademark, Trap Boiz, Tezy & Twenty, Trenseta, True Da Hustla, Walter Black Roz, Warren Clark, Whiteboy Wasted, Woo Child, Young Hawk, and Yung LA.

Soleternity has composed instrumentals for MTV, ESPN, And1 Live Tour, and Native Instruments.

In 2003, Soleternity supplied the instrumental for the song "Sleep with an AK" by Young Buck featuring Skip of UTP. The instrumental was originally called "No Lights On" and was produced in 2002.

In 2004, Soleternity produced 17 songs on the album "Beautifully Absurd" by the hip hop-r&b group Mistaken Identity. He also performed vocals on 6 songs.

In 2010, Soleternity produced 13 songs on the album "Welcome to Charlotte" by hip hop artist Mr. 704. Guest appearances on the album include Khujo Goodie, Pastory Troy, and Pimp of Dirty.

On November 4, 2011, Soleternity, Harrison Kjell, Alexander Barclay, and Barry Nailor released an iPhone app entitled "SE Mobile Studio."

On April 22, 2013, Soleternity and hip hop artist Fresco released the "MMXVII" EP containing 7 songs produced by Soleternity.

== The High and Mighty Movie ==
During 2008-09, Soleternity and filmmaker Nick McGill collaborated to create "The High and Mighty"—an independent, semi-fictional movie about the unintended consequences resulting from criminal choices made by the film's lead character, Conner.

The movie screened twice in front of sold out crowds on December 31, 2009, at Rockford, Illinois's Showplace 16 Theater.

The website TheRockfordBlog.com gave the movie 3.5/5 stars.

It can be viewed in its entirety on the McGill Original Films YouTube channel.

== Instrumental Albums ==
- 2010: Deep
- 2011: Big White Guy With A Brew
- 2014: Beats 4 Yeti Snowman

== Education ==
In 2011, Soleternity enrolled at Rock Valley College. He graduated with an Associate of Arts degree in 2013. He delivered the graduation ceremony's student commencement speech.

In the fall of 2013, he enrolled at Yale University to complete his Bachelor of Arts degree, majoring in Ethics, Politics, and Economics. He graduated in May 2016.
