= The Gates Mixed Plate =

Studio album by Tech N9ne
- Released: July 27, 2010
- Genres: Gangsta rap; Midwest hip-hop; G-funk
- Length: 1:16:57
- Label: Strange Music
- Producers: Executive Producer Travis O'Guin; Musical Producers: Charles S. Neal IV; Emaydee; Karbon; Matic Lee; Nardo; Robert Rebeck; Seven; Tech N9ne; Young Fyre

Tech N9ne chronology
The Lost Scripts of K.O.D. (2010)	The Gates Mixed Plate (2010)	Seepage (2010)

Tech N9ne Collabos chronology
Sickology 101 (2009)	The Gates Mixed Plate (2010)	Welcome to Strangeland (2011)

Singles from The Gates Mixed Plate
- 1. "O.G." Released: June 29, 2010; 2. "Jumpin' Jax" Released: June 29, 2010; 3. "KC Tea" Released: July 21, 2010

Professional ratings
Review scores
Source	Rating
Allmusic	link

The Gates Mixed Plate is the tenth studio album by rapper Tech N9ne, which was released on July 27, 2010. It is the third album in the rapper's "Collabos" series, following the 2009 album Sickology 101. The album's name is in reference to the Kansas City Bar-B-Q restaurant Gates Bar-B-Q. The album's first single, "O.G." further references the restaurant.

The album has what the artists describes as "lighter music" after the 2009 album, K.O.D., took a "darker" approach. When speaking on the content of the album, the artist said the album "is full of party tracks because I'm trying to rejoice." The album also features guest appearances by Kutt Calhoun, Krizz Kaliko, Big Scoob, Brotha Lynch Hung, Stevie Stone, Jay Rock, Glasses Malone, Yukmouth, Devin the Dude, Irv Da Phenom, and many more.

== Singles and videos ==
On June 11, MTVU.com premiered the music video for the first single, "O.G." The video was directed by Dan Gedman. The single was featured in a list of the "Top 10 Party Anthems for Summer 2010" on ARTISTdirect.com along with the likes of "Can't Be Tamed" (Miley Cyrus), "Ms. Chocolate" (Lil' Jon) and "Alejandro" (Lady Gaga).

Both "O.G." and "Jumpin' Jax" were released as digital singles on June 29, 2010. The official video for "KC Tea" was released on the Strange Music YouTube channel on July 21, 2010. The video was directed by Dan Gedman.

== Commercial performance ==
The album sold 17,000 copies in its first week and 5,000 copies during its second. Record sales reached upwards of 22,000 copies in only 2 weeks. Album sold about 50,000 copies until 2011.

== Track listing ==
No.	Title	Writer(s)	Producer(s)	Length
1.	"Ms. Walker/Brooklyn Martino Intro"		Robert Rebeck; Tech N9ne	0:16
2.	"O.G."	A. Yates; M. Summers; S. Watson	Seven	3:17
3.	"F U Pay Me" (featuring Krizz Kaliko & Makzilla)	A. Yates; J. Brunstetter; M. Queen; S. Watson; T. Winfrey	Young Fyre; Karbon	3:59
4.	"Gamer" (featuring Kutt Calhoun & Krizz Kaliko)	A. Yates; M. Calhoun Jr.; M. Dupree; S. Watson	Mike Dupree	4:13
5.	"Jumpin' Jax" (featuring Stevie Stone, Krizz Kaliko & Bishop Young Don)	A. Yates; E. Dixon; J. Brunstetter; S. Watson; S. Williams; T. Winfrey	Young Fyre; Karbon	4:58
6.	"Keep It One Hunit" (featuring Big Scoob, Glasses Malone & Irv Da Phenom)	A. Yates; C. Penniman; J. Brunstetter; M. Irving Jr.; S. Ashby Jr.; T. Winfrey	Young Fyre; Karbon	4:12
7.	"Pow Pow" (featuring Kutt Calhoun, Mon. E.G. The Ghostwriter, Riv Locc & Tay Diggs)	A. Yates; G. Bolton; L. Young; M. Calhoun Jr.; M. Dean; M. Tyler	Demolishbeatz	5:17
8.	"Harvey Dent"	A. Yates; M. Dupree	Mike Dupree	2:49
9.	"Tony G Intro"		Robert Rebeck	0:13
10.	"What's Next" (featuring Craig Smith, Krizz Kaliko & Oobergeek)	A. Yates; C. Smith; M. Dupree; M. Yates; S. Watson	Mike Dupree	4:11
11.	"Afterparty" (featuring Kutt Calhoun & Devin the Dude)	A. Yates; D. Copeland; M. Calhoun Jr.; M. Dupree	Mike Dupree	4:09
12.	"Too Many Girls" (featuring Krizz Kaliko & Sundae)	A. Yates; J. Appleby; S. Austin; S. Watson	Matic Lee	4:22
13.	"Pu Wah Wah" (performed by 816 Boyz)	A. Yates; M. Calhoun Jr.; M. Queen; M. Summers; S. Watson	Seven	4:20
14.	"Sean Tyler (Intro)"		Robert Rebeck	0:12
15.	"KC Tea" (featuring Krizz Kaliko)	A. Yates; M. Summers; S. Watson	Seven	4:02
16.	"JT Quick Intro"		Robert Rebeck	0:23
17.	"Oh You Didn't Know" (featuring Irv Da Phenom & The Popper)	A. Yates; L. Young; M. Irving Jr.; W. Edwin	Demolishbeatz	4:13
18.	"Far Out" (featuring J.L. of B. Hood, P.R.E.A.C.H. & Stevie Stone)	A. Yates; E. Bothazy; J. Varnes; L. Young; S. Williams	Demolishbeatz	4:38
19.	"Paper with Brian B Shynin Intro" (featuring Jay Rock, Joe Vertigo & Krizz Kaliko)	A. Yates; B. Shynin; C. Neal IV; J. McKenzie; J. Watson; S. Watson	Charles S. Neal IV	4:02
20.	"Loud" (featuring Alan Wayne tha Pradagy, Bizzy & Irv Da Phenom)	A. Yates; A. Wayne; L. Young; M. Irving Jr.; T. Oglesby	Demolishbeatz	4:50
21.	"Need More Angels with Prayer by Brother K.T." (featuring Irv Da Phenom)	A. Yates; K. Taylor; M. Dupree; M. Irving Jr.	Mike Dupree	4:52
22.	"Doin' It" (Bonus Track) (featuring Chillest Illest, OME & Yukmouth)	A. Yates; J. Ellis; J. Pringle; L. Young; S. Mitchell	Demolishbeatz	3:41

Strange Music pre-order digital bonus track
No.	Title	Producer(s)	Length
23.	"What's Yo Psycho?" (performed by Nnutthowze; featuring Brotha Lynch Hung)	Demolishbeatz	4:34

== Personnel ==
- Aaron Bean – Street marketing
- Alan Wayne – Featured performer
- Alistair Photography – Photography
- Andrea Lopez – Additional vocals
- Anita Hilanthom – Additional vocals
- Ben Grossi – Project consultant/general management
- Big Scoob – Featured performer
- Bishop YoungDon – Featured performer
- Bizzy – Featured performer
- Bob Grossi – Project consultant/general management
- Brett Morrow – Internet marketing
- Brian B Shynin – Skit
- Brian Fraser – Production assistant
- Brian Shafton – Project consultant/general management
- Britton Kimler – Marketing & promotions
- Brooklyn Martino – Skit
- Brother K.T. – Skit
- Caitlin Sutter – Additional vocals
- Chillest Illest – Featured performer
- Chris Rooney – Marketing & promotions
- Cory Nielson – Production assistant
- Crystal Watson – Additional vocals
- Dave Weiner – Associate producer
- Dawn O'Guin – Production assistant
- Demecica Frazier – Additional vocals
- Devin the Dude – Featured performer
- Emaydee – Producer
- Glasses Malone – Featured performer
- Glenda Cowan – Production assistant
- Irv da Phenom – Featured performer
- Jennifer Rogers – Additional vocals
- JL (of B. Hood) – Featured performer
- Joe Vertigo – Featured performer, crap tube
- Josh Rickards – Street marketing
- JT Quick – Skit
- Karbon – Producer
- Korey Lloyd – Production assistant, project management/publicity coordinator
- Krizz Kaliko – Featured performer, crap tube
- Kutt Calhoun – Featured performer
- Liquid 9 – Art direction & design
- Makzilla – Featured performer
- Matic Lee – Producer
- Megan McLean – Publicity
- Mike Dupree – Music Producer
- Mon. E. G. the Ghostwriter – Featured performer
- Nardo – Producer
- Ome – Featured performer
- P.R.E.A.C.H. – Featured performer
- The Popper – Featured performer
- Richie Abbott – Publicity
- Rivv Loc – Featured performer
- Robert Lieberman – Legal
- Robert Rebeck – Producer, mixing
- Robin Geiger – Additional vocals
- Ron Spaulding – Associate producer
- Sean Tyler – Skit
- Seven – Producer
- Stacy Bell – Additional vocals
- Stevie Stone – Featured performer
- Sundae – Featured performer
- Tammy Thornton – Additional vocals
- Tay Diggs – Featured performer
- Tech N9ne – Primary performer, producer, A&R
- Tom Baker – Mastering
- Tony G – Skit
- Travis O'Guin – Executive producer, A&R
- Young Fyre – Producer
- Yukmouth – Featured performer

== Charts ==
=== Weekly charts ===
Chart (2010)	Peak position
US Billboard 200	13
US Independent Albums (Billboard)	1
US Top R&B/Hip-Hop Albums (Billboard)	5
