= Chopper (rap) =

Rapping style within the hip hop genre

Chopper rap
- Other names: Chopper
- Cultural origins: Early-1990s
- Typical instruments: Vocals

Regional scenes
- Midwestern hip-hop; East Coast hip-hop; West Coast hip-hop

Other topics
- Auto-Tune; Cloud rap; Mumble rap

Chopper rap, also simply known as chopper, is a subgenre of hip hop music that originated in the Midwestern United States and features fast-paced rhyming or rapping. Those that rap in the style are known as choppers, and rapping in the style is sometimes referred to as chopping. The style is one of the major forms in hip hop. However, by the early 2000s, it had spread to other parts of the United States including New York City and California; its popularity has since spread around the world.

Chopper style places an emphasis on speed of pronunciation, and as such is commonly attributed to some of the fastest professional rappers, such as Bone Thugs-n-Harmony, Mac Lethal, Twista, Big L, Tech N9ne, Twisted Insane, Busta Rhymes, Krizz Kaliko, George Watsky, Jaz-O and Eminem.

== Etymology ==
The word "chopper" was first used in street and hip hop slang to refer to an automatic firearm. The word has also been used as an informal word for helicopter. The linkage to automatic firearms and helicopters are the rapid "tat-tat-tat" sound they make. This may have an analogous relation to fast-paced rap. One of the first rappers who popularized this style of rap, Twista, in a song with Tech N9ne entitled "Worldwide Choppers" implied this in his lyrics, "I'm finna be usin' it as energy, watch how radiant I'ma be / Like a helicopter when the words fly" was used to loosely describe the style of fast-paced rap, but the usage of the term was made more widespread when rap artist Tech N9ne released a series of posse cuts with other chopper-style rap artists from around the world in 2007, 2009, 2011 and 2015 including "Midwest Choppers" and "Midwest Choppers 2", "Worldwide Choppers" and "Speedom (Worldwide Choppers 2)". The trend of naming songs in this fashion spread, with examples such as DCVDNS & Tamas's track "German Choppers" and the Undaground Choppers series produced by DJ Lil Sprite, which currently includes ten installments.

The word "chopper" can simply be used for any rapper that uses a fast-paced style in their lyrics. The word is also used as a verb, as in "chopping" or "to chop", in describing the action of rapping at high speeds.

== Characteristics ==
Chopper rap is typically characterized by the inclusion of twice or three times as many syllables to each bar and line as would be found in most other forms of rap. Sophisticated rhyme schemes are also an important element of the style. The inclusion of two or three times as many syllables in the bars causes the lyrics to be described as being in "double-time" or "triple-time". The beat tempo of chopper songs, particularly from the Midwest, tends to range from 90 BPM to 180 BPM, a much higher range than most other rap genres. Maintaining the quality of lyrics in terms of rhyming and substance while increasing speed of delivery is one of the key aspects of the style.

The term "chopper" does not imply any thematic characteristics, and songs in the style touch on a wide range of subjects. One subgenre chopper rappers often cross into is horrorcore, seen in Tech N9ne's "Am I a Psycho?" featuring Hopsin and B.o.B or the rapper Twisted Insane's albums. Midwest rapper Prozak explained that the style often revolves around "dark beats and lyrics" in the DVD The Hitchcock of HipHop.

== History ==
=== 1980s – Origins of fast rapping ===
Although the subgenre of chopper-style hip hop did not achieve broad mainstream appeal until the early–mid 1990s through artists such as Bone Thugs-n-Harmony and Twista, the style has been around for decades. The first group to rap at high speeds on record were the Treacherous Three with the release of "New Rap Language" in 1980. Throughout the lyrics of the song, member Kool Moe Dee is referred to as the originator of the fast style:

For MCs who bite

The fast-talking rhymes
They're gonna feast
So get ready to eat
Moe Dee's the originator
So you might as well starve
Cause you can't catch this fast beat

(Hit it, Moe)

— Special K, "The New Rap Language"

Kool Moe Dee went on a year later to use one of the verses of "New Rap Language" against Busy Bee in a New York rap battle in 1981.

The style of rapping fast was also popular with Jamaican rappers in the early 1980s with releases by Daddy Freddy ("Joker Lover"), Shinehead ("Rough and Rugged") and Peter King ("Me Neat, Me Sweet").

In the 1990s, the style spread to the West Coast, with artists at "The Good Life" such as Ellay Khule, Freestyle Fellowship, CVE, Riddlore, Chubb Rock, Mikah 9 and many other Project Blowed affiliates adopting the style.

=== 1990s – Emergence of chopper rap as a distinct and popular style ===
Although the style of rapping at high speeds had existed in both East Coast hip hop and West Coast hip hop as well as abroad, it was not until the 1990s that chopper rap began to emerge as a distinct and popular form of hip-hop. The Dayton Family and Twista were active in the Midwest in the early 1990s and developed the use of chopper rapping as their main style. This ushered in a wave of chopper acts from the Midwest that began to receive attention, such as Twista in Chicago and the group Bone Thugs-n-Harmony from Cleveland. Bone Thugs-n-Harmony signed to Eazy-E's Ruthless Records in 1993 and their 1994 EP Creepin on ah Come Up reached No. 12 on the Billboard 200 charts. Their next albums E. 1999 Eternal (1995) and The Art of War (1997) both reached No. 1 on the Billboard 200 chart and also produced the 1996 single "Tha Crossroads" which reached No. 1 on the Billboard Hot 100 singles chart. This success helped to popularize the chopper style across the United States and beyond. During this period, many other rappers in the Midwest that would go on to become highly successful began their rapping careers as underground artists releasing songs in the chopper style, such as Eminem and Tech N9ne.

At the same time Twista and The Dayton Family were popularising the style in the Midwest, New York emcee Jaz-O (also known at the time as The Jaz) was using the fast-paced chopper rap style in his music, releasing his debut album Word to the Jaz in 1989 and To Your Soul in 1990. Jaz-O was the mentor of the then-unknown Jay-Z, and these albums included the first songs Jay-Z was ever on, "Hawaiian Sophie" and "The Originators". In this way Jay-Z began his career in the chopper style of rap before moving into slower forms, and in the liner notes of Vol. 2... Hard Knock Life he describes this, saying of "The Originators" that "we was using that fast style that everybody seems to be using now". Vol 2... Hard Knock Life also included the single "Nigga What, Nigga Who (Originator 99)" as a sequel to their previous chopper-style collaboration. Also active in New York in the late 1990s was Latino rapper Big Pun, who was known for his fast-paced, witty lyrics and ability to rap for long periods of time without taking a breath, very much in the manner of the chopper style.

=== 2000–present – Spread across the globe ===
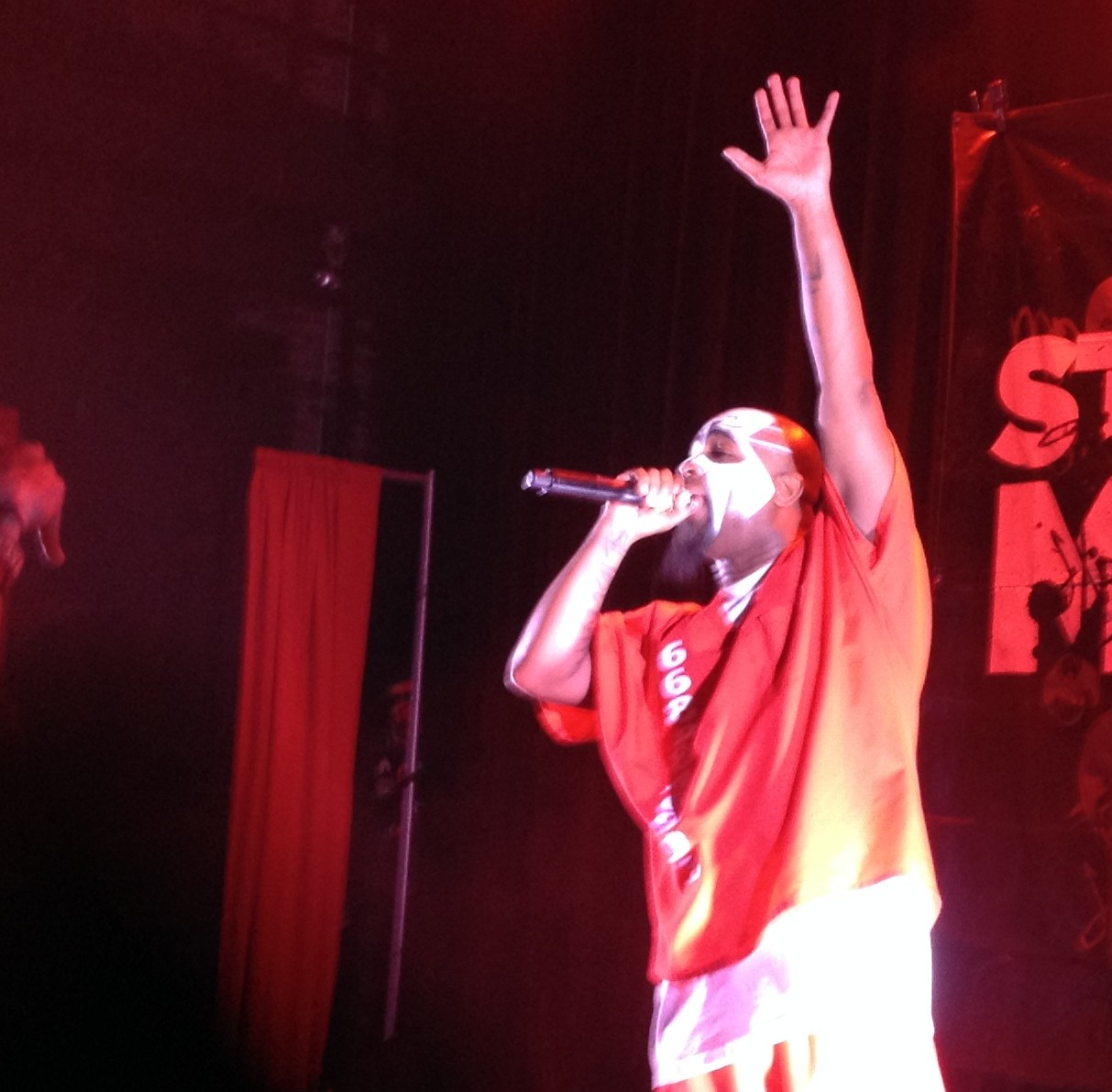
Tech N9ne is one of the most successful artists to rap in the chopper style.

In 1999, Missouri rapper Tech N9ne and his business partner Travis O'Guin founded the independent record label Strange Music. Anghellic, Tech N9ne's first album released through Strange Music, sold 278,000 copies and marked his breakthrough from an underground artist to a commercial success. He continued to release albums on the independent label regularly, with six further albums in the 2000s alone, and became established as one of the major chopper artists. His "Tech N9ne Collabos" series, so far consisting of eight albums released between 2007 and 2017, is a collection of albums featuring other artists on every track, through which Tech N9ne has introduced a wide range of artists to his substantial fanbase. The albums include collaborations from fellow Strange Music artists such as Krizz Kaliko, Yukmouth and Kutt Calhoun; as well as other chopper rappers, other rappers who do not normally rap in chopper style, and some rock artists. Due largely to the success of Tech N9ne's career, Strange Music has become a major independent record label and hosts a sizeable roster of artists including many in the chopper genre.

The 2000s also saw mainstream success come for some of the earliest choppers. Twista's fourth studio album, Kamikaze, topped the Billboard 200 chart in 2004, and his next three albums all reached the chart's top 10. Bone Thugs-n-Harmony released five albums from 2000 to 2010, all of which charted in the top 50 positions of the Billboard 200. Throughout the 1990s, New York rapper Busta Rhymes had been creating music, first as a part of the group Leaders of the New School from 1989 to 1993 and then as a solo artist from then onwards. Beginning with his 1998 album Extinction Level Event: The Final World Front he began to rap at faster speeds on some songs, and throughout the time since then he has incorporated chopper-style rapping on several of his successful tracks, such as 2001's "Break Ya Neck" and his guest verse on Tech N9ne's 2011 single "Worldwide Choppers", leading many to consider Busta Rhymes a chopper rapper. Rhymes' music was highly successful throughout the 2000s, and his unorthodox style is considered by some to be one of the most significant developments in the style in recent times.

The 21st century has seen chopper rap spread from its roots in the Midwest and in New York around the world of hip hop. In the South, rappers such as Chamillionaire and Yelawolf have used the style, while on the West Coast rappers such as San Diego-born rapper Twisted Insane and Snow Tha Product from San Jose regularly rap in the chopper style. The style has also spread to Europe, with Danish rapper U$O and Turkish rapper Ceza both featuring on Tech N9ne's aforementioned single "Worldwide Choppers", and particularly to Germany. German rappers such as Samy Deluxe, Olli Banjo, Kollegah, Hollywood Hank, DCVDNS and Schwartz. ShimmyMC featured American choppers Twisted Insane and Wrekonize on his single "Thron". The style has also been adopted in Asia, with Korean rapper Outsider being known for his very high speed rapping in the Korean language, as well as Filipino rapper Gloc-9 who integrated chopper rap with socially conscious lyrics commenting on the political and social climate of his native Philippines.

== See also ==
- Alternative hip hop
- List of hip hop genres
- Scat singing
- Trap
- Footwork
- Mumble rap
