= Stevie Stone =

American rapper

- Born: Stephen Lewis Williams; July 28, 1981 (age 45); Columbia, Missouri, U.S.
- Genres: Hip-hop
- Occupation: Rapper
- Years active: 2007–present
- Labels: Ruthless; Strange; Ahdasee Records
- Website: therealsteviestone.com

Stephen Lewis Williams (born July 28, 1981), better known by his stage name Stevie Stone, is an American rapper from Columbia, Missouri. He was signed to Tech N9ne's Strange Music record label from 2011 to 2021 and has since founded his own record label Ahdasee Records. He has released seven studio albums, with his most recent being Raising The Bar in April 2022.

== Career ==
Stone grew up in Columbia, Missouri, and is based in St. Louis. He discovered a love of music through his mother, a singer and choir director who introduced the rapper to gospel, blues, and soul at an early age. As he grew up, Stone had his feet in the worlds of music and sports, pursuing a basketball career and playing piano and drums. Though he received an offer to play ball for a junior college in Iowa, he was asked to open at a show just weeks before he would leave for school, and he chose to focus on his rap career. In 2007, Stone signed with Ruthless Records, which released his debut, New Kid Coming, on September 29, 2009. Not long afterwards, the MC left the label to sign with Tech N9ne's Strange Music. On June 12, 2012, his second studio album Rollin' Stone was released. On October 23, 2012, he released an EP titled Momentum. On August 13, 2013, his third studio album 2 Birds 1 Stone was released. In 2021, Stevie Stone announced across social media platforms that he has officially departed Strange Music and has since announced Ahdasee Records as his new record label with the release of his first independent single since 2009 titled "Jumping Out The Window".

== Discography ==
=== Studio albums ===
List of studio albums, with selected chart positions
Title	Album details	Peak chart positions		
Title	Album details	US	US R&B	US Rap
New Kid Comin	Released: September 29, 2009; Label: Ruthless; Format: CD, digital download	—	—	—
Rollin' Stone	Released: June 12, 2012; Label: Strange Music; Format: CD, digital download	78	12	9
2 Birds 1 Stone	Released: August 13, 2013; Label: Strange Music; Format: CD, digital download	76	11	9
Malta Bend	Released: June 30, 2015; Label: Strange Music; Format: CD, digital download	193	15	9
Level Up	Released: June 2, 2017; Label: Strange Music; Format: CD, digital download	—	—	—
Kontra-Band (with JL)	Released: April 20, 2018; Label: Strange Music; Format: CD, digital download	—	—	—
Black Lion	Released: August 7, 2020; Label: Strange Music; Format: CD, digital download	—	—	—
Raising the Bar	Released: April 1, 2022; Label: Ahdasee; Format: CD, digital download	—	—	—
No Blueprints	Released: October 3, 2025; Label: Ahdasee; Format: CD, digital download	—	—	—

=== Extended plays ===
List of extended plays, with selected chart positions
Title	EP details	Peak chart positions		
Title	EP details	US	US R&B	US Rap
Momentum	Released: October 23, 2012; Label: Strange Music; Format: CD, digital download	196	27	22
Set in Stone I	Released: February 22, 2019; Label: Strange Music; Format: Digital download	—	—	—

=== Mixtapes ===
Title	Mixtape details	Peak chart positions		
Title	Mixtape details	US	US R&B	US Rap
Himmie Hyme Vol. 1: Food Stamps	Released: 2006; Label: Ruthless; Format: Digital download	—	—	—
Himmie Hyme Vol. 2: Class Is Now In Session	Released: 2008; Label: Ruthless; Format: Digital download	—	—	—
Himmie Hyme Vol. 3: The Countdown	Released: 2009; Label: Ruthless; Format: Digital download	—	—	—
Himmie Hyme Vol. 4: Set In Stone	Released: 2010; Label: Ruthless; Format: Digital download	—	—	—

=== Singles ===
List of singles, with selected chart positions and certifications, showing year released and album name
Title	Year	Peak chart positions			Album
Title	Year	US	US R&B	US Rap	Album
"Wait a Minute"	2008	—	—	—	New Kid Comin
"Run It"	2015	—	—	—	Malta Bend
"Fall In Love With It" (featuring Darrein Safron)	2015	—	—	—	Malta Bend
"Rain Dance" (featuring Tech N9ne & Mystikal)	2015	—	—	—	Malta Bend
"Get Fucked Up"	2015	—	—	—	Malta Bend
"Options"	2017	—	—	—	Level Up
"Whippin' Up" (featuring DB Bantino)	2017	—	—	—	Level Up
"Another Level"	2017	—	—	—	Level Up
"Paradise"	2017	—	—	—	Level Up
"Eat II"	2017	—	—	—	Level Up
"Deep End" (with Kontages)	2017	—	—	—	Non-album single
"Groomed By The Block" (with JL)	2018	—	—	—	Kontra-Band
"No Permission" (featuring Spaide R.I.P.P.E.R.)	2020	—	—	—	Black Lion
"Dope Sick"	2020	—	—	—	Black Lion
"Jungle" (featuring King Iso)	2020	—	—	—	Black Lion
"Type of Time" (featuring Spaide R.I.P.P.E.R.)	2020	—	—	—	Black Lion
"Still Standing" (featuring Dan Marsala of Story of the Year & Rittz)	2020	—	—	—	Black Lion
"Jumping Out the Window"	2021	—	—	—	Non-album singles
"Wasted" (featuring Caskey)	2021	—	—	—	Non-album singles
"Reputation" (with Spaide R.I.P.P.E.R.)	2021	—	—	—	Non-album singles
"BSP"	2022	—	—	—	Raising the Bar
"Presha" (featuring Kutt Calhoun)	2023	—	—	—	TBA
"—" denotes a recording that did not chart or was not released in that territory.

=== Guest appearances ===
List of non-single guest appearances, with other performing artists, showing year released and album name
Title	Year	Other artist(s)	Album
"Jumpin' Jax"	2010	Tech N9ne, Krizz Kaliko, Bishop YoungDon	The Gates Mixed Plate
"Far Out"	2010	Tech N9ne, JL of B. Hood, P.R.E.A.C.H.	The Gates Mixed Plate
"Calm Down"	2010	Kutt Calhoun, Riv Locc	Raw and Un-Kutt
"Hard Core"	2010	Krizz Kaliko	Shock Treatment
"Stranger"	2010	Cognito, Tech N9ne, Big Scoob, Kutt Calhoun, Loki	Automatic
"Overtime"	2011	Tech N9ne	All 6's and 7's
"Won't You Come Dirty"	2011	Tech N9ne, Young Bleed	Welcome to Strangeland
"EMJ"	2011	Tech N9ne, Irv da Phenom, Kutt Calhoun, ¡Mayday!, Jay Rock, Krizz Kaliko, Magnum PI	Welcome to Strangeland
"Dollar General" (Remix)	2012	¡Mayday!, Yelawolf	Smash and Grab
"TNT" (Remix)	2012	¡Mayday!, Black Thought, Jay Rock, Jon Connor, DJ Khaled	Smash and Grab
"Colorado"	2013	Tech N9ne, B.o.B, Ces Cru, Krizz Kaliko, ¡Mayday!, Rittz	Something Else
"Forever New"	2013	¡Mayday!	Believers
"Nobody Cares: (The Remix)"	2014	Tech N9ne, Wrekonize, Bernz, Ces Cru, Krizz Kaliko	Strangeulation
"Strangeulation II"	2014	Godemis, Murs, Brotha Lynch Hung	Strangeulation
"Na Na"	2014	Tech N9ne, Rittz	Strangeulation
"Stink"	2014	Krizz Kaliko, Tech N9ne, Kendall Morgan	Strangeulation
"Nobody Cares"	2014	Tech N9ne, Krizz Kaliko	Strangeulation
"Strangeulation Vol.II Cypher II"	2015	Tech N9ne Ces Cru	Strangeulation Vol. II
"Fired"	2015	Tech N9ne, Darrein Safron	Strangeulation Vol. II
"Chilly Rub"	2015	Tech N9ne, Godemis	Strangeulation Vol. II
"Need Jesus"	2016	Tech N9ne, J.L.	The Storm
"Know Better"	2016	Big Scoob	H.O.G.
"Stop Breathing"	2016	Rittz, Ces Cru	Top of the Line
"More"	2016	Krizz Kaliko	GO
"No No's"	2016	Krizz Kaliko	GO
"Put Em on"	2017	Tech N9ne, Darrein Safron	Dominion
"Nevermind Me"	2017	Tech N9ne, Krizz Kaliko & Mackenzie Nicole	Dominion
"Take You Down"	2017	Mackenzie Nicole, Ryan Bradley	Dominion
"Angels in the Playground"	2017	Tech N9ne, Krizz Kaliko	Dominion
"Minimize"	2017	Tech N9ne, Krizz Kaliko	Strange Reign
"Come Down"	2017	Tech N9ne, Krizz Kaliko	Strange Reign
"Plenty"	2017	Krizz Kaliko, Ces Cru	Strange Reign
"Quicksand"	2017	Big Scoob, Godemis	Strange Reign
"Version"	2018	Info Gates	Thankful
"Pray"	2019	Ubiquitous, Joey Cool	Under Bad Influence
"Head Case"	2019	Joey Cool	Old Habits Die Hard
"Little"	2020	Krizz Kaliko	Legend
"I Think"	2020	Tech N9ne, Bernz, Godemis, Jehry Robinson, JL, Joey Cool, King Iso, Krizz Kaliko, Maez301, UBI, Wrekonize	FEAR EXODUS
"Chop It Down"	2020	Cashius King	Chop It Down
"Taking It All"	2022	def rebel	
"You Don't Want None"	2024	def rebel	
"Rulers Of The World"	2025	def rebel	
