= 2 Birds 1 Stone =

Studio album by Stevie Stone
- Released: August 13, 2013
- Recorded: 2012–2013
- Genre: Hip-hop
- Length: 50:41
- Label: Strange Music
- Producer: Bandcamp Chris; BCGS; Cash Clay; Darrein Safron; Diesel Beatz; Farrell "Rell" Rogers; Jamelle "Foss Warlock" Foster; Jeffery "Frizz" James; Jelly Joe; Johnny Juliano; J. White Did It; Karbon; Nick Fury; Noble Beats; Peso Piddy; Stevie Stone; Thomas "Tom" Burns; Wyshmaster

Stevie Stone chronology
Momentum (2012)	2 Birds 1 Stone (2013)	Malta Bend (2015)

Professional ratings
Review scores
Source	Rating
AllMusic	3/5 stars

2 Birds 1 Stone is the third studio album by American rapper Stevie Stone. It was released on August 13, 2013, via Strange Music. Production was handled by J. White Did It, BandCamp Chris, BCGS, Cash Clay, Darrein Safron, Diesel Beatz, Farrell "Rell" Rogers, Foss Weirdo, Jeffery "Frizz" James, Jelly Joe, Johnny Juliano, Karbon, Nick Fury, Noble Beats, Peso Piddy, Thomas "Tom" Burns, Wyshmaster, and Stevie Stone himself. It features guest appearances from Krizz Kaliko, Bernz, Brotha Lynch Hung, Darrein Safron, Jarren Benton, Mai Lee, Rittz, Spaide R.I.P.P.E.R., Tech N9ne, Wrekonize and Ms. Kriss. The album debuted at number 76 on the Billboard 200 chart, with first-week sales of 4,700 copies in the United States.

== Track listing ==
No.	Title	Writer(s)	Producer(s)	Length
1.	"Intro"	Stephen Williams	Stevie Stone	0:10
2.	"2 Birds 1 Stone"	Williams; Jarrell Walters	Diesel Beatz	3:46
3.	"Get Out My Face" (featuring Krizz Kaliko)	Williams; Samuel Watson; Anthony Germaine White	J. White Did It	3:21
4.	"The Reason" (featuring Spaide Ripper)	Williams; Joseph Bonds; Clifton Garrett Fitzsimmons III; Patrick Michael Wadsworth	Peso Piddy; BCGS	4:15
5.	"Grave Digga"	Williams; Courtney Elkins	Cash Clay; Julius Rivera (co.)	3:27
6.	"In My Zone" (featuring Jonah)	Williams; Nicholaus Loftin; Jamelle Foster	Nick Fury; Foss Weirdo	2:53
7.	"Relentless"	Williams; Joseph D. Young	Jelly Joe	2:51
8.	"Hush" (featuring Kutt Calhoun and Brotha Lynch Hung)	Williams; Kevin Mann; Adam Cherrington	Wyshmaster	3:42
9.	"Phases" (featuring Krizz Kaliko)	Williams; Watson; John E. Julian	Johnny Juliano	3:20
10.	"Indigo" (featuring Wrekonize, Bernz and Mai Lee)	Williams; Benjamin Miller; Bernando Garcia; Tarelle Flowers	Noble Beats	3:31
11.	"Boomerang" (featuring Krizz Kaliko)	Williams; Watson; White	J. White Did It	3:01
12.	"Boo Thing" (featuring Darrein)	Williams; Darrein Safron; Jeffery James; Farrell Rogers; Thomas Burns	Darrein; Frizz; Tom; Rell	3:26
13.	"She Go"	Williams; White	J. White Did It	2:11
14.	"Let It Beat"	Williams; White	J. White Did It	3:18
15.	"The Baptism" (featuring Tech N9ne and Rittz)	Williams; Aaron D. Yates; Jonathan McCollum; Joshua Brunstetter	Karbon	3:47
16.	"1 0'Clock Jump" (featuring Jarren Benton)	Williams; Jarren Benton; Christopher Ryan Guyton	BandCamp Chris	3:42
Total length:				50:41

Deluxe edition bonus tracks
No.	Title	Producer(s)	Length
17.	"Stevie" (featuring Ms. Kriss)		3:18
18.	"Finding a Way"	David Sanders II	4:10

Strange Music pre-order digital bonus track
No.	Title	Length
19.	"Fire"	3:22

== Personnel ==
- Stephen "Stevie Stone" Williams – vocals, producer (track 1), A&R
- Samuel "Krizz Kaliko" Watson – vocals (tracks: 3, 9, 11)
- Joseph "Spaide Ripper" Bonds – vocals (track 4)
- Jonah "Matic Lee" Appleby – vocals (track 6)
- Kevin "Brotha Lynch Hung" Mann – vocals (track 8)
- Benjamin "Wrekonize" Miller – vocals (track 10), recording (tracks: 3, 9)
- Bernando "Bernz" Garcia – vocals (track 10)
- Mai Lee – vocals (track 10)
- Darrein Safron – vocals & producer (track 12)
- Aaron "Tech N9NE" Yates – vocals (track 15)
- Jonathan "Rittz" McCollum – vocals (track 15)
- Jarren Benton – vocals (track 16)
- Jarrell "Diesel Beatz" Walters – producer (track 2)
- Anthony "J. White Did It" White – producer (tracks: 3, 11, 13, 14)
- Clifton Garrett Fitzsimmons III – producer (track 4)
- Patrick Michael Wadsworth – producer (track 4)
- Courtney "Cash Clay" Elkins – producer (track 5)
- Nicholaus "Nick Fury" Loftin – producer (track 6)
- Jamelle "Foss Weirdo" Foster – producer (track 6)
- Joseph D. "Jelly Joe" Young – producer (track 7)
- Adam "Wyshmaster" Cherrington – producer (track 8)
- Johnny Juliano – producer (track 9)
- Tarelle "Noble Beats" Flowers – producer (track 10)
- Thomas "Tom" Burns – producer (track 12), recording (tracks: 5, 6, 12)
- Farrell "Rell" Rogers – producer (track 12)
- Jeffery "Frizz" James – producer (track 12)
- Josh "Karbon" Brunstetter – producer (track 15)
- Christopher Ryan "Bandcamp Chris" Guyton – producer (track 16)
- Julius Rivera – co-producer (track 5)
- Tim Hanson – recording (tracks 17, 18)
- Nathan Hershey – recording (tracks: 2–4, 7–13, 15, 16)
- Ben Cybulsky – recording (tracks: 3, 8, 9, 11, 15), mixing
- Ross Vanderslice – recording (track 14)
- Tom Baker – mastering
- Travis O'Guin – executive producer, A&R
- Dave Weiner – associate producer, A&R
- Korey Lloyd – assistant producer, management
- Cory Nielsen – assistant producer
- Dawn O'Guin – assistant producer
- Glenda Cowan – assistant producer
- Valdora Case – assistant producer
- Violet Brown – assistant producer
- Liquid 9 – art direction, design
- James Meierotto – photography
- Mike Landau – A&R, management
- Richie Abbott – A&R
- Ben Grossi – management
- Brad Goldenberg – management
- Brian Shafton – management
- Robert Lieberman – legal

== Charts ==
Chart performance for 2 Birds 1 Stone
Chart (2013)	Peak position
US Billboard 200	76
US Top R&B/Hip-Hop Albums (Billboard)	11
US Top Rap Albums (Billboard)	9
US Independent Albums (Billboard)	14
