= Welcome to My Hood =

2011 single by DJ Khaled featuring Rick Ross, Plies, Lil Wayne and T-Pain

Single by DJ Khaled featuring Rick Ross, Plies, Lil Wayne and T-Pain

from the album We the Best Forever
- Released: January 18, 2011
- Recorded: 2010
- Genre: Gangsta rap; hip-hop
- Length: 4:11; 7:10 (remix)
- Label: We the Best; Terror Squad; Young Money; Cash Money; Universal Motown
- Songwriters: William Roberts; Algernod Washington; Dwayne Carter Jr.; Faheem Najm; Johnny Mollings; Lenny Mollings
- Producers: The Renegades; Cubic Z; DJ Khaled (co-production); DJ Nasty

DJ Khaled singles chronology
"All I Do Is Win" (2010)	"Welcome to My Hood" (2011)	"I'm on One" (2011)

Rick Ross singles chronology
"Living Better Now" (2010)	"Welcome to My Hood" (2011)	"Can a Drummer Get Some?" (2011)

Plies singles chronology
"Phone #" (2010)	"Welcome to My Hood" (2011)	"Fucking Or What" (2013)

Lil Wayne singles chronology
"6 Foot 7 Foot" (2011)	"Welcome to My Hood" (2011)	"Look at Me Now" (2011)

T-Pain singles chronology
"No Dejemos Que se Apague" (2010)	"Welcome to My Hood" (2011)	"Boom" (2011)

"Welcome to My Hood" is a song by American record producer DJ Khaled featuring American rappers Rick Ross, Plies, Lil Wayne, and T-Pain from the former's fifth studio album We the Best Forever. The album also contains the remix of the song featuring Ludacris, Busta Rhymes, Mavado, Twista, Birdman, Ace Hood, Fat Joe, The Game, Jadakiss, Bun B, and Waka Flocka Flame. The song is Khaled's first single to be produced with The Renegades, Cubic Z, DJ Nasty and LVM. It was released for digital download in the United States on January 18, 2011.

Featured artist T-Pain has referred to the song as successor to Khaled's 2007 song "I'm So Hood", which featured a similar hook from himself, and verses from Ross, Plies, and Trick Daddy.

== Music video ==
Gil Green directed the music video, which includes cameos from Flo Rida, Bow Wow, Busta Rhymes, Wale, Meek Mill, Ace Hood, Jae Millz, Marley G, Triple C's, Brisco, DJ Drama, Mack Maine, Birdman and many more. The video shows T-Pain and Rick Ross posted up in the projects, later joining the rest of the crew for a night shoot against graffiti-covered walls.

== Remix ==
"Welcome to My Hood (Remix)"

Single by DJ Khaled featuring Ludacris, T-Pain, Busta Rhymes, Mavado, Twista, Birdman, Ace Hood, Fat Joe, Jadakiss, Bun B, The Game and Waka Flocka Flame

from the album We the Best Forever
- Released: March 14, 2011
- Recorded: 2011
- Genre: Hip-hop; gangsta rap
- Length: 7:10
- Label: We the Best; Terror Squad; Young Money; Cash Money; Universal Motown
- Songwriters: Faheem Najm; Johnny Mollings; Lenny Mollings
- Producers: Lex Luger; The Renegades; Cubic Z; The Runners; The Nasty Beatmakers

DJ Khaled singles chronology
"All I Do Is Win" (2010)	"Welcome to My Hood (Remix)" (2011)	"I'm on One" (2011)

T-Pain singles chronology
"No Dejemos Que se Apague" (2010)	"Welcome to My Hood (Remix)" (2011)	"Electroman" (2011)

Ludacris singles chronology
"Tonight (I'm Lovin' You)" (2010)	"Welcome to My Hood (Remix)" (2011)	"Little Bad Girl" (2011)

Busta Rhymes singles chronology
"Look at Me Now" (2011)	"Welcome to My Hood (Remix)" (2011)	"Worldwide Choppers" (2011)

Twista singles chronology
"Make a Movie" (2010)	"Welcome to My Hood (Remix)" (2011)	"Worldwide Choppers" (2011)

Birdman singles chronology
"Fire Flame" (2011)	"Welcome to My Hood (Remix)" (2011)	"I Get Money" (2011)

Ace Hood singles chronology
"Hustle Hard" (2011)	"Welcome to My Hood (Remix)" (2011)	"Go 'N' Get It" (2011)

Fat Joe singles chronology
"If It Ain't About Money" (2010)	"Welcome to My Hood (Remix)" (2011)	"Another Round" (2011)

Game singles chronology
"Can a Drummer Get Some?" (2011)	"Welcome to My Hood (Remix)" (2011)	"Red Nation" (2011)

Jadakiss singles chronology
"Who's Real" (2009)	"Welcome to My Hood (Remix)" (2011)	"Hold You Down" (2011)

Bun B singles chronology
"What Up" (2010)	"Welcome to My Hood (Remix)" (2011)	"Country Shit (Remix)" (2011)

Waka Flocka Flame singles chronology
"Grove St. Party" (2011)	"Welcome to My Hood (Remix)" (2011)	"Coppin' the Best" (2011)

The official remix features Ludacris, T-Pain, Busta Rhymes, Twista, Mavado, Birdman, Ace Hood, Fat Joe, Game, Jadakiss, Bun B, and Waka Flocka Flame, released on March 14, 2011.

As with the remix for Khaled's previous song "All I Do Is Win", Khaled himself raps a verse on the "Welcome to My Hood" remix.

As with the official music video, a 'Behind the Scenes' video to "Welcome to My Hood" was released on April 1.

On April 27, the official music video was released for the remix. Game does not appear in the video, nor does his verse. Rick Ross and French Montana made a cameo in the video.

AllMusic stated that the remix is "an air horn-fueled Miami anthem with Khaled taking a rare producer's credit".

== Charts ==
=== Weekly charts ===
Chart (2011)	Peak position
US Billboard Hot 100	79
US Hot R&B/Hip-Hop Songs (Billboard)	30
US Hot Rap Songs (Billboard)	14
US Rhythmic Airplay (Billboard)	39

=== Year-end charts ===
Chart (2011)	Position
US Hot R&B/Hip-Hop Songs (Billboard)	94

== Certifications ==
Region	Certification	Certified units/sales
United States (RIAA)	Gold	500,000^{‡}
^{‡} Sales+streaming figures based on certification alone.

== Release history ==
List of release dates, record label and format details
Country	Date	Format	Label
United States	January 18, 2011	Digital download	We the Best; Terror Squad; Young Money; Cash Money; Universal Motown
