= Monsterifik =

Studio album by Big Scoob
- Released: September 15, 2009
- Genre: Hip hop
- Length: 1:14:13
- Label: Strange Music
- Producer: Boogie Man; Robert Rebeck; Seven; Wyshmaster; Young Fyre

Big Scoob chronology
Monsterifik (2009)	Damn Fool (2011)

Tech N9ne Presents chronology
Vitiligo (2008)	Monsterifik (2009)	Rollin' Stone (2012)

Monsterifik is the debut solo studio album by American rapper Big Scoob. It was released on September 15, 2009 via Strange Music, marking the label's second album under the "Tech N9NE Presents" banner following Krizz Kaliko's 2008 Vitiligo.

Production was handled by Boogie Man, Seven, Wyshmaster, Robert Rebeck and Young Fyre, with Q-Rock serving as additional producer. It features guest appearances from his fellow 57th Street Rogue Dog Villains groupmates Txx Will and Bakarii a.k.a. Mr. Whitebear, and his labelmates Krizz Kaliko, Tech N9ne, Kutt Calhoun and Skatterman, as well as 1 Ton, 8Ball & MJG, B-Legit, Irv Da Phenom and Johnny Richter.

The album peaked at number 67 on the Top R&B/Hip-Hop Albums and number 42 on the Independent Albums charts in the United States.

Three singles were released for the album: "Bet I Don't" and "Big Fella", were both released on August 18, 2009 as digital singles, and "Salue" with an accompanying music video was released on the Strange Music YouTube page on September 11, 2009.

== Track listing ==
No.	Title	Writer(s)	Producer(s)	Length
1.	"Drafted Intro" (Skit)	Stewart D. Ashby Jr.; Manzilla Queen	Robert Rebeck	1:17
2.	"Big Fella"	Ashby Jr.	Young Fyre	4:05
3.	"Bet I Don't" (featuring Txx Will and B-Legit)	Ashby Jr.; William Oates; Brandt Jones	Wyshmaster	4:24
4.	"Real Nigga"	Ashby Jr.; Samuel Watson	Seven	3:40
5.	"Monsterifik" (featuring Krizz Kaliko and Tech N9NE)	Ashby Jr.; Queen; Watson; Aaron D. Yates	Wyshmaster	4:26
6.	"Don't Get Stompt" (featuring Tech N9NE)	Ashby Jr.; Yates	Seven	3:44
7.	"Take Aim"	Ashby Jr.	Seven	3:18
8.	"Bring It 2 Tha Table" (featuring Skatterman)	Ashby Jr.; Watson; Stacy Landis	Wyshmaster	3:12
9.	"Only Know Hard" (featuring 8Ball, MJG and Krizz Kaliko)	Ashby Jr.; Premro Smith; Marlon Jermaine Goodwin; Queen; Watson	Boogie Man	4:15
10.	"Breathe Again" (featuring Irv Da Phenom)	Ashby Jr.; Mitchell Irving Jr.	Seven	3:26
11.	"Brand New Day" (featuring Krizz Kaliko)	Ashby Jr.	Boogie Man	4:24
12.	"Reflektions" (featuring Krizz Kaliko)	Ashby Jr.	Boogie Man	4:03
13.	"D-Boy" (featuring Krizz Kaliko)	Ashby Jr.; Watson	Boogie Man	3:31
14.	"Street Life" (featuring Mr. Whitebear, Txx Will and Krizz Kaliko)	Ashby Jr.; Michael Whitebear; Oates	Boogie Man	3:45
15.	"Let Me Holla at Cha" (featuring Krizz Kaliko and Kutt Calhoun)	Ashby Jr.; Queen; Watson; Melvin Calhoun	Boogie Man	4:08
16.	"Doe Doe Doe" (featuring Johnny Richter, Boogie Man and 1 Ton)	Ashby Jr.; Timothy McNutt; Bryant Smith; James Kerri	Boogie Man	5:15
17.	"Salue" (featuring Tech N9NE)	Ashby Jr.; Yates	Wyshmaster	4:00
18.	"Stik @ Move" (featuring Tech N9NE, Krizz Kaliko, Txx Will and Mr. Whitebear)	Ashby Jr.; Yates; Watson; Oates; Whitebear	Young Fyre; Quinton "Q-Rock" Johnson (add.)	5:00
19.	"How We Party"	Ashby Jr.	Robert Rebeck	2:53
20.	"Drafted Outro" (Skit)	Ashby Jr.; Queen	Robert Rebeck	1:27
Total length:				1:14:13

Strange Music pre-order digital bonus track
No.	Title	Length
21.	"Freaks of the Industry" (featuring Krizz Kaliko, Kutt Calhoun and Tech N9NE)	4:17

== Charts ==
Chart (2009)	Peak position
US Top R&B/Hip-Hop Albums (Billboard)	67
US Independent Albums (Billboard)	42
