= Damn Fool =

2011 album by Big Scoob

Studio album by Big Scoob
- Released: May 3, 2011
- Genres: Hardcore hip hop; gangsta rap
- Length: 72:32
- Label: Strange Music
- Producers: Robert Rebeck; Seven; IvyRoc Kravyn; Boogie Man; EmayDee; Demolish Beatz; Wyshmaster

Big Scoob chronology
Monsterifik (2009)	Damn Fool (2011)	No Filter (2011)

Damn Fool is the second studio album by American rapper Big Scoob, released on May 3, 2011 by American label Strange Music. The album serves as a follow-up to Big Scoob's debut album Monsterifik.Guests on the album include Glasses Malone, Bumpy Knuckles, Krizz Kaliko, Tech N9ne and Jay Rock with production being provided by Seven, Robert Rebeck and EmayDee, amongst others.

== Singles ==
The first single and video released was "All I Kno Is Hood" while "Akka Damn Fool" was also released as a digital single. Big Scoob planned to shoot a video with Glasses Malone for the song "They Don't Want It", but this hasn't come to fruition.

== Track listing ==
No.	Title	Producer(s)	Length
1.	"Laugh MF's (Intro)" (featuring Makzilla)	Robert Rebeck	0:58
2.	"Dickey Mouf"	Seven	3:03
3.	"All I Kno Is Hood" (featuring Krizz Kaliko)	IcyRoc Kravyn	3:49
4.	"Wuss Up Buhh? (Skit)"	Robert Rebeck	0:32
5.	"Akka Damn Fool"	Boogie Man	3:28
6.	"The Recipe (Skit)"	Robert Rebeck	0:22
7.	"Lemonade Delight" (featuring Krizz Kaliko & Crystal Watson)	Seven	2:53
8.	"Lil Kuzz (Skit)" (featuring Makzilla)	Robert Rebeck	0:37
9.	"Drunk & Stupid" (featuring Tech N9ne & Chillest Illest)	Seven	3:31
10.	"Frank & Berry (Skit)" (featuring Makzilla)	Robert Rebeck	0:30
11.	"White Bitch" (featuring Krizz Kaliko & Irv Da Phenom)	Seven	2:53
12.	"Twistin Yay" (featuring Krizz Kaliko, Skatterman & Rappin Twan)	EmayDee	3:42
13.	"I Move With The Night" (featuring Tech N9ne & T-Nutty)	Demolish Beatz	3:56
14.	"Dead-A-Man" (featuring Krizz Kaliko)	Wyshmaster	3:09
15.	"DAMU" (featuring Skatterman, Bumpy Knuckles, Jay Rock & Messy Marv)	Seven	4:53
16.	"FUCK Strange (Skit)"	Robert Rebeck	0:49
17.	"They DNT Want It" (featuring Glasses Malone & Boogie Man)	Boogie Man	4:09
18.	"5-6" (featuring Txx Will)	Demolish Beatz	4:08
19.	"2 Fat Fucks" (featuring Krizz Kaliko)	Seven	3:37
20.	"Punk Bitch (Skit)" (featuring Makzilla, Brittany Williams & Diana Taylor)	Robert Rebeck	1:17
21.	"If U Kall" (featuring Krizz Kaliko, Irv Da Phenom & Big Rich)	Seven	3:31
22.	"Spotlight" (featuring Tech N9ne & Krizz Kaliko)	EmayDee	2:55
23.	"Take Me Away" (featuring Irv Da Phenom)	Seven	4:32
24.	"Amazing" (featuring Irv Da Phenom)	Boogie Man	4:36
25.	"Always Gone (Skit)"	Robert Rebeck	0:40
26.	"Doin My Thang" (featuring Irv Da Phenom & Txx Will)	EmayDee	4:00
Total length:			72:30
