= Rollin' Stone (album) =

Studio album by Stevie Stone
- Released: June 12, 2012
- Recorded: 2011–2012
- Genre: Hip-hop
- Length: 52:35
- Label: Strange Music
- Producer: 40 oz., Aaron Naeger, Ben Cybulsky, Frizz, Johnny Juliano, Koko, Nardo, Rip Knoxx, Seven, Rell, Tali Blanco, Oliver Grose aka OGtha3, Tom, Wyshmaster, WLPWR

Stevie Stone chronology
New Kid Comin (2009)	Rollin' Stone (2012)	Momentum (2012)

Tech N9ne Presents chronology
Monsterifik (2009)	Rollin' Stone (2012)

Rollin' Stone is the second studio album by American rapper Stevie Stone. The album was released on June 12, 2012, by Strange Music. The album features guest appearances from Tech N9ne, Krizz Kaliko, Kutt Calhoun, Peetah Morgan, Yelawolf, Hopsin, SwizZz, Big Scoob, Spaide R.I.P.P.E.R., Wrekonize, Magnum PI and Bernz. The album debuted at number 78 on the Billboard 200 chart.

== Background ==
In a June 2012, interview with XXL, Stevie Stone spoke about the album, saying: "It's a rollercoaster ride, even my slow records and my serious records are gonna have that 808 and that kick up in there. But on this album, I think it's a very full album, it's something for everybody. This is more one of the party records, the club type records for the album. But there's definitely different records that's gonna put you in a different mind frame. Like I did a record called 'My Remedy,' and that's just saying that when I hit the stage, music becomes my remedy and all my problems fade away. Music is my escape. It don't matter what happens, I been in situations where I get a bad phone call like five minutes before I hit the stage on some bullshit. But soon as I hit the stage and I give it to the crowd and they give it to me back, all that shit just goes out the window... Strap on your seatbelt when you listen to it. I definitely think it's gonna turn a lot of heads. You gonna see on the album, you can't necessarily put Stevie Stone in a box."

== Critical reception ==
Professional ratings
Review scores
Source	Rating
AllMusic	3.5/5 stars

Gregory Heaney of AllMusic gave the album three and a half stars out of five, saying "Stone seizes on the opportunity to reach a whole new group of listeners with an album that plays out like a meeting between new friends at a party. Early in the album, listeners get to see Stone's rowdy side on tracks like "808 Bendin'" and "Keep My Name Out Your Mouth," which feature guest spots by labelmates Tech N9ne and Kutt Calhoun, respectively, before getting personal deeper into the album, opening up on more plaintive, reflective tracks like "My Life" and "The Road." Even though Stone had been kicking around on Ruthless Records for a while, Rollin' Stone feels like a chance for Stone to reintroduce himself to the rap world, and with the production talent, care, and personal touch of Strange behind him, it's an opportunity he takes full advantage of."

== Commercial performance ==
The album debuted at number 78 on the Billboard 200 chart, with first-week sales of 6,000 copies in the United States.

== Track listing ==
No.	Title	Producer(s)	Length
1.	"Intro"	Ben Cybulsky	0:05
2.	"Get Buck"	Wyshmaster	2:29
3.	"808 Bendin'" (featuring Tech N9ne)	Johnny Juliano	3:51
4.	"Perfect Stranger"	Frizz, Rell	3:30
5.	"Cast Out" (featuring Krizz Kaliko)	Nardo	3:10
6.	"Keep My Name Out Your Mouth" (featuring Kutt Calhoun)	Tali Blanco	3:51
7.	"Oneness" (featuring Peetah Morgan)	Koko, 40 oz.	4:30
8.	"My Remedy (Skit)"	Ben Cybulsky	0:35
9.	"My Remedy"	Rip Knoxx	3:59
10.	"Dollar General" (featuring Yelawolf)	WLPWR	3:29
11.	"Raw Talk" (featuring Hopsin & SwizZz)	Aaron Naeger	3:15
12.	"Goin' Down" (featuring Big Scoob & Spaide R.I.P.P.E.R.)	Seven	3:11
13.	"Mosh"	Seven	3:31
14.	"2 Far"	Seven	3:30
15.	"My Life"	Frizz, Tom	3:42
16.	"The Road" (featuring Wrekonize, Magnum PI & Bernz)	Oliver Grose aka OGtha3	5:55
Total length:			52:35

Strange Music pre-order digital bonus track
No.	Title	Length
17.	"In The Game"	3:30

== Charts ==
Chart (2012)	Peak position
US Billboard 200	78
US Top R&B/Hip-Hop Albums (Billboard)	12
US Independent Albums (Billboard)	16
