= Malta Bend (album) =

Studio album by Stevie Stone
- Released: June 30, 2015
- Genre: Hip-hop
- Length: 59:09
- Label: Strange Music
- Producer: Ben Cybulsky; Deji LaRay; Jeffery "Frizz" James; J. White Did It; ¡Mayday!; RCM2; Seven; TeeJayDaGreat; Thomas "Tom" Burns

Stevie Stone chronology
2 Birds 1 Stone (2013)	Malta Bend (2015)	Level Up (2017)

Professional ratings
Review scores
Source	Rating
AllMusic	4/5 stars

Malta Bend is the fourth studio album by American rapper Stevie Stone. It was released on June 30, 2015, via Strange Music, marking his third studio album for the label. Production was handled by Seven, Deji LaRay, Jeffery "Frizz" James, J. White Did It, Ben Cybulsky, ¡Mayday!, RCM2, TeeJayDaGreat and Thomas "Tom" Burns. It features guest appearances from Darrein Safron, Tech N9ne, Ces Cru, Glasses Malone, Kevin Gates, King Harris, Mystikal, Peetah Morgan, Tyler Lyon and Ya Boy.

The album debuted at number 193 on the Billboard 200, number 15 on the Top R&B/Hip-Hop Albums, number 9 on the Top Rap Albums and number 12 on the Independent Albums charts in the United States.

== Promotion ==
The album was available for pre-order on May 19, 2015, with the bonus track entitled "Eat". There were four music videos directed from the songs off of the album: "Run It" was released on May 27, 2015, "Get Fucked Up" was released on June 29, 2015, "Rain Dance" was released on July 9, 2015, and "Fall In Love With It" was released on July 27, 2015.

== Track listing ==
No.	Title	Writer(s)	Producer(s)	Length
1.	"Where It All Began" (Intro Skit)	Stephen Williams; Michael Summers	Seven	2:15
2.	"Run It"	Williams; Summers	Seven	2:52
3.	"I'm So Epic" (featuring Peetah Morgan)	Williams; Peter Morgan; Timothy James	TeeJayDaGreat	2:35
4.	"What's Real" (Skit)	Christopher Sean Harris	Ben Cybulsky	0:58
5.	"The Homies" (featuring Ya Boy)	Williams; William Crawford; Summers	Seven	3:43
6.	"Rain Dance" (featuring Tech N9NE and Mystikal)	Williams; Aaron D. Yates; Michael L. Tyler; Summers	Seven	3:42
7.	"Fall in Love With It" (featuring Darrein)	Williams; Darrein Safron; Jeffery James II	Frizz	3:14
8.	"The Interview" (Skit)	Deji LaRay	Deji LaRay	1:19
9.	"Bodyrock" (featuring Darrein)	Williams; Safron; James II; Thomas Burns	Frizz; Tom	3:08
10.	"Boss Shit" (featuring Kevin Gates)	Williams; Kevin Gilyard; Richard Mims II	RCM2	3:02
11.	"Get Fucked Up"	Williams; Anthony G. White	J. White Did It	3:03
12.	"Rated X" (featuring Tech N9NE)	Williams; Yates; Pamela Wells; Benjamin Miller; Bernardo Garcia; Gianni Perocarpi; Daniel Emilio Perez; Keith Cooper	¡Mayday!; Danny "Keys" Perez (add.); Keith Cooper (add.)	3:17
13.	"Wait On It" (featuring Ces Cru)	Williams; Mike Viglione; Donnie King; White	J. White Did It	3:21
14.	"Far From Home" (Skit)	LaRay; Michael McClain	Deji LaRay	3:35
15.	"Suicidal" (featuring Glasses Malone and King Harris)	Williams; Charles Penniman; King Harris II; Summers	Seven	3:39
16.	"Sunday Morning" (Skit)	LaRay; Summers	Deji LaRay; Seven	1:34
17.	"Malta Bend" (featuring Tyler Lyon)	Williams; Tyler Lyon; Summers	Seven	4:02
18.	"Ambition and Motivation"	Williams; Wells; James II	Frizz	3:27
19.	"Legacy"	Williams; Lyon; Isaac Cates; Summers	Seven	4:23
20.	"Just Gettin' Started" (Outro Skit)	Williams; Summers	Seven	2:00
Total length:				59:09

Strange Music pre-order digital bonus track
No.	Title	Length
21.	"Eat"

== Personnel ==
- Stephen "Stevie Stone" Williams – vocals, A&R
- Peter "Peetah" Morgan – additional vocals (track 3)
- Christopher Sean Harris – additional vocals (track 4)
- William "Ya Boy" Crawford – additional vocals (track 5)
- Delynia Brown – additional vocals (tracks: 5, 18)
- Aaron D. "Tech N9NE" Yates – additional vocals (tracks: 6, 12)
- Michael "Mystikal" Tyler – additional vocals (track 6)
- Darrein Safron – additional vocals (tracks: 7, 9)
- Zalika Miller – additional vocals (track 8)
- Jeffery "Frizz" James – additional vocals (track 9), producer (tracks: 7, 9, 18)
- Kevin "Gates" Gilyard – additional vocals (track 10)
- Mike "Ubiquitous" Viglione – additional vocals (track 13)
- Donnie "Godemis" King – additional vocals (track 13)
- Big Mike – additional vocals (track 14)
- Matt Steele – additional vocals (track 14)
- DJ P-Caso – additional vocals (track 14)
- Charles "Glasses Malone" Penniman – additional vocals (track 15)
- King Harris II – additional vocals (track 15)
- Deji LaRay – additional vocals (track 16), producer (tracks: 8, 14, 16)
- LaToya Betts – additional vocals (tracks: 16, 19)
- Dana Mitchell – additional vocals (tracks: 16, 19)
- Christopher Watson – additional vocals (track 16)
- Tyler Lyon – additional vocals (track 17)
- RoShawn Eve – additional vocals (track 19)
- Cardon Bolen – additional vocals (track 19)
- Sherita Freeman – additional vocals (track 19)
- YoLynda Hill-Scott – additional vocals (track 19)
- Megan Smith – additional vocals (track 19)
- Isaac Cates – piano (tracks: 1, 16, 20), choir vocals arrangement (track 19)
- Ben Cybulsky – guitar (track 17), acoustic guitar (track 19), producer (track 4), recording, mixing
- Chris Handley – bass guitar (track 17)
- Lance Bennett – drums (track 17)
- Michael "Seven" Summers – producer (tracks: 1, 2, 5, 6, 15–17, 19, 20)
- Timothy "TeeJayDaGreat" James – producer (track 3)
- Thomas "Tom" Burns – producer (track 9)
- Richard "RCM2" Mims II – producer (track 10)
- Anthony "J. White Did It" White – producer (tracks: 11, 13)
- Benjamin "Wrekonize" Miller – producer (track 12)
- Bernardo "Bernz" Garcia – producer (track 12)
- Gianni "Gianni Ca$h" Perocarpi – producer (track 12)
- Danny "Keys" Perez – additional producer (track 12)
- Keith Cooper – additional producer (track 12)
- Tom Baker – mastering
- Travis O'Guin – executive producer, A&R
- Dave Weiner – associate producer, A&R
- Samantha Levi – photography

== Charts ==
Chart (2015)	Peak position
US Billboard 200	193
US Top R&B/Hip-Hop Albums (Billboard)	15
US Top Rap Albums (Billboard)	9
US Independent Albums (Billboard)	12
