= Kickin' and Screamin' =

Kickin' & Screamin'

Studio album by Krizz Kaliko
- Released: May 15, 2012
- Recorded: 2011–2012
- Genre: Alternative hip-hop; hardcore hip-hop; R&B; dubstep
- Length: 1:02:23
- Label: Strange Music
- Producer: Seven; Young Fyre; Ben Cybulsky

Krizz Kaliko chronology
Shock Treatment (2010)	Kickin' & Screamin' (2012)	Son of Sam (2013)

Professional ratings
Review scores
Source	Rating
AllMusic	3.5/5 stars
HipHopDX	3.5/5
laut.de	4/5 stars

Kickin' and Screamin' is the fourth studio album by American rapper Krizz Kaliko. It was released on May 15, 2012 via Strange Music. Production was handled by Seven, Young Fyre and Ben Cybulsky. It features guest appearances from Tech N9ne, Big Scoob, Twiztid, 816 Boyz, Bernz, Chamillionaire, Prozak, Rittz, Scenario, T-Pain, Twista and Wrekonize. The album debuted at number 43 on the Billboard 200, number 7 on the Top R&B/Hip-Hop Albums, number 4 on the Top Rap Albums and number 11 on the Independent Albums charts in the United States, making it his most successful album.

== Background ==
Krizz Kaliko first announced the title of his album in early 2011. After the release of Tech N9ne's extended play Klusterfuk, Strange Music began to reveal information on the upcoming album by Krizz Kaliko. On March 15, 2012, Krizz Kaliko contacted rapper Hopsin through Twitter for a collaboration for the album. Several days later, Hopsin responded and agreed to collaborate for the album.

On April 3, 2012, a pre-order for the album was released. The pre-order includes the free download of the album's bonus track, "Bad Man" featuring Oobergeek. Revealed features for the album include Tech N9ne, Wrekonize and Bernz of ¡Mayday!, Twiztid, Chamillionaire, Twista, T-Pain and Rittz. It had been revealed through Twitter that Hopsin was intended to be on the album, however the track was not completed in time to make the album.

== Track listing ==
No.	Title	Producer(s)	Length
1.	"Intro (Skit)" (featuring Scenario)	Ben Cybulsky	0:20
2.	"Dancin' with Myself"	Seven	3:23
3.	"Kali Baby"	Seven	2:57
4.	"Kill Shit" (featuring Twista and Tech N9ne)	Seven	4:00
5.	"Mayday" (featuring Chamillionaire and Rittz)	Seven	4:21
6.	"Dumb for You" (featuring T-Pain)	Young Fyre	2:30
7.	"Spaz" (featuring Tech N9ne)	Seven	3:21
8.	"Dixie Cup" (featuring Big Scoob and Twiztid)	Seven	4:12
9.	"Abu Dhabi" (performed by 816 Boyz)	Seven	3:26
10.	"Species"	Seven	3:14
11.	"Can't Be the Only One" (featuring Tech N9ne)	Seven	4:52
12.	"Created a Monster"	Seven	4:14
13.	"Hello Walls" (featuring Tech N9ne)	Seven	3:44
14.	"Wannabe" (featuring Twiztid)	Seven	5:49
15.	"Unstable"	Seven	3:56
16.	"Dream of a King" (featuring Prozak, Bernz and Wrekonize)	Seven	4:12
17.	"Stay Alive" (featuring Big Scoob)	Young Fyre	3:52
Total length:			1:02:23

iTunes bonus tracks
No.	Title	Length
18.	"Layin' Down" (featuring Liz Suwandi)	4:27
19.	"So Hard"	3:12

Pre-order bonus track
No.	Title	Length
20.	"Bad Man" (featuring Oobergeek)	3:52

== Charts ==
Chart (2012)	Peak position
US Billboard 200	43
US Top R&B/Hip-Hop Albums (Billboard)	7
US Top Rap Albums (Billboard)	4
US Independent Albums (Billboard)	11
