= Momentum (Stevie Stone EP) =

EP by Stevie Stone
- Released: October 23, 2012
- Recorded: 2012
- Genre: Hip-hop
- Length: 21:46
- Label: Strange Music
- Producer: Diesel Beatz; Jeffery "Frizz" James; Jelly Joe; Karbon; TeeJayDaGreat

Stevie Stone chronology
Rollin' Stone (2012)	Momentum (2012)	2 Birds 1 Stone (2013)

Momentum is the first extended play by American rapper Stevie Stone. It was released on October 23, 2012, via Strange Music. Production was handled by Karbon, TeeJayDaGreat, Diesel Beatz, Frizz, Jelly Joe, with Travis O'Guin serving as executive producer. It features guest appearances from Kutt Calhoun and Spaide Ripper.

The album debuted at number 196 on the Billboard 200, number 27 on the Top R&B/Hip-Hop Albums, number 22 on the Top Rap Albums and number 45 on the Independent Albums charts with first-week sales of 2,400 copies in the United States.

A music video was directed for the title track "Momentum".

== Track listing ==
No.	Title	Writer(s)	Producer(s)	Length
1.	"Momentum"	Stephen Williams; Alandon Pitts; Jarrell Walters	Diesel Beatz	3:19
2.	"Gettin' Ugly"	Williams; Timothy James	TeeJayDaGreat	2:53
3.	"Outer Lane"	Williams; Joseph D. Young	Jelly Joe	3:29
4.	"Turn It Up"	Williams; Jeffery James II	Frizz	3:09
5.	"Feels Good"	Williams; Joshua Brunstetter	Karbon	3:03
6.	"Jump" (featuring Kutt Calhoun and Spaide R.I.P.P.E.R.)	Williams; Melvin Calhoun Jr.; Joseph Bonds; James	TeeJayDaGreat	2:56
7.	"Long Time Comin'"	Williams; Brunstetter	Karbon	2:57
Total length:				21:46

== Personnel ==
- Stephen "Stevie Stone" Williams – vocals
- Alandon "ICU" Pitts – additional vocals (track 1)
- Jeffery "Frizz" James – additional vocals & producer (track 4)
- Mai Lee – additional vocals (track 5)
- Melvin "Kutt Calhoun" Calhoun Jr. – additional vocals (track 6)
- Joseph "Spaide Ripper" Bonds – additional vocals (track 6)
- DJ P-Caso – scratches (track 4)
- Jarrell "Diesel Beatz" Walters – producer (track 1)
- Timothy "TeeJayDaGreat" James – producer (tracks: 2, 6)
- Joseph D. "Jelly Joe" Young – producer (track 3)
- Josh "Karbon" Brunstetter – producer (tracks: 5, 7)
- Ross Vanderslice – recording (tracks: 1, 5, 6)
- Nathan Hershey – recording (tracks: 2, 3, 5, 6)
- Thomas "Tom" Burns – recording (tracks: 4, 7)
- Ben Cybulsky – mixing
- Neil Simpson – mastering
- Travis O'Guin – executive producer

== Charts ==
Chart (2011)	Peak position
US Billboard 200	196
US Top R&B/Hip-Hop Albums (Billboard)	27
US Top Rap Albums (Billboard)	22
US Independent Albums (Billboard)	45
