= Vitiligo (album) =

Studio album by Krizz Kaliko
- Released: May 6, 2008
- Genre: Hip hop, alternative hip hop, R&B
- Length: 72:50 (Explicit); 74:10 (Clean)
- Label: Strange Music
- Producer: David Sanders II, Robert Rebeck, Seven, Soleternity, TyJilla, Young Fyre

Krizz Kaliko chronology
| Vitiligo (2008) | Genius (2009) |

Tech N9ne Presents chronology
| Vitiligo (2008) | Monsterifik (2009) |

Singles from Vitiligo
- 1. "Do It Like I Do It" Released: March 25, 2008

Professional ratings
Review scores
| Source | Rating |
|---|---|
| RapReviews | (7.5/10)link |
| URB | link |

Vitiligo is the debut album by American rapper Krizz Kaliko. His debut album comes after spending several years lending his voice to releases from Tech N9ne and his other labelmates. The album's title comes from the skin disorder vitiligo, which Krizz has.

The album contained several guests features, such as Tech N9ne, who appeared on a good portion of the album. Other names who appeared on the album include the group Twiztid, bay area rapper E-40 as well as several of Kaliko's fellow label mates. The clean version of the album included one more feature, King Gordy, on the track "Mirror, Mirror." Those who pre-ordered the album through F.Y.E. received a free bonus downloadable track titled "In Da Whip."

In its release week, Vitiligo found its way onto several Billboard charts. Among them were the Billboard 200 at #167, Top Independent Albums at #19 and Top Rap Albums at #20.

== Track listing ==
Explicit track listing
| No. | Title | Writer(s) | Producer(s) | Length |
|---|---|---|---|---|
| 1. | "The Ride (Skit)" | A. Yates | Robert Rebeck | 01:08 |
| 2. | "Anxiety" (Inspired by Tech N9ne) | S. Watson | David Sanders II | 04:00 |
| 3. | "Vitiligo" | M. Queen, S. Watson | Seven | 02:16 |
| 4. | "What's Sizzlin'" (featuring Tech N9ne) | A. Yates, M. Queen, S. Watson | Seven | 03:42 |
| 5. | "Do It Like I Do It" | S. Watson | Seven | 03:57 |
| 6. | "Jungle Love" (featuring Tech N9ne) | A. Yates, S. Watson | Seven | 04:20 |
| 7. | "Do Sum'n" | S. Watson | Seven | 04:37 |
| 8. | "The Bidness" (featuring DJ Chill & E-40) | M. Queen, E. Stevens, S. Mitchell, S. Watson | Seven, Krizz Kaliko | 03:53 |
| 9. | "The Tunnel (Skit)" | A. Yates | Robert Rebeck | 00:10 |
| 10. | "Peek-A-Boo" (featuring Prozak & Twiztid) | J. Spaniolo, P. Methric, S. Shippy, S. Watson | Seven, Krizz Kaliko, Tech N9ne | 03:42 |
| 11. | "Crew Cut" (featuring BG Bulletwound, Kutt Calhoun, Makzilla, Skatterman, Snug Brim & Tech N9ne) | A. Henderson, A. Yates, G. Roland, M. Calhoun, M. Queen, S. Watson | Mr. Rooq | 04:38 |
| 12. | "Ain't'cha Bitch" (featuring Tech N9ne) | A. Yates, S. Watson | Soleternity | 03:06 |
| 13. | "Slow Down" (featuring Agginy & Tech N9ne) | A. Yates, R. Swinton, S. Watson | Seven | 05:27 |
| 14. | "Rewind" (featuring Tech N9ne) | A. Yates, S. Watson | David Sanders II | 04:35 |
| 15. | "Beautiful You Are" | S. Watson | TyJilla | 03:03 |
| 16. | "Let's Dip" | A. Yates, S. Watson | Seven, Krizz Kaliko | 03:40 |
| 17. | "Collect" (featuring Kutt Calhoun) | A. Yates, M. Calhoun, S. Watson | Seven | 03:50 |
| 18. | "Saucy" | S. Watson | Seven, Krizz Kaliko | 04:10 |
| 19. | "If I Ever Go" | M. Calhoun, S. Watson | Young Fyre | 04:29 |
| 20. | "The Ride II (Skit)" | A. Yates | Robert Rebeck | 00:23 |
| 21. | "Where You Want Me" (featuring Kutt Calhoun & Tech N9ne) | M. Calhoun, S. Watson | Seven, Krizz Kaliko | 03:44 |
| Total length: | | | | 72:50 |

Clean track listing
| No. | Title | Writer(s) | Producer(s) | Length |
|---|---|---|---|---|
| 1. | "The Ride (Skit)" | A. Yates | Rob Rebeck | 01:08 |
| 2. | "Anxiety" (Inspired by Tech N9ne) | S. Watson | David Sanders II | 04:00 |
| 3. | "Vitiligo" | M. Queen, S. Watson | Seven | 02:16 |
| 4. | "What's Sizzlin'" (featuring Tech N9ne) | A. Yates, M. Queen, S. Watson | Seven | 03:42 |
| 5. | "Do It Like I Do It" | S. Watson | Seven | 03:57 |
| 6. | "Jungle Love" (featuring Tech N9ne) | A. Yates, S. Watson | Seven | 04:20 |
| 7. | "Do Sum'n" | S. Watson | Seven | 04:37 |
| 8. | "The Bidness" (featuring DJ Chill & E-40) | M. Queen, S. Earl, S. Mitchell, S. Watson | Seven, Krizz Kaliko | 03:53 |
| 9. | "The Tunnel (Skit)" | A. Yates | Robert Rebeck | 00:10 |
| 10. | "Mirror, Mirror" (featuring King Gordy) | | Seven | 04:25 |
| 11. | "Peek-A-Boo" (featuring Prozak & Twiztid) | J. Spaniolo, P. Methric, S. Shippy, S. Watson | Seven, Krizz Kaliko, Tech N9ne | 03:42 |
| 12. | "Crew Cut" (featuring BG Bulletwound, Kutt Calhoun, Makzilla, Skatterman, Snug Brim & Tech N9ne) | A. Henderson, A. Yates, G. Roland, M. Calhoun, M. Queen, S. Watson | Mr. Rooq | 04:38 |
| 13. | "Slow Down" (featuring Agginy & Tech N9ne) | A. Yates, R. Swinton, S. Watson | Seven | 05:27 |
| 14. | "Rewind" (featuring Tech N9ne) | A. Yates, S. Watson | David Sanders II | 04:35 |
| 15. | "Beautiful You Are" | S. Watson | TyJilla | 03:03 |
| 16. | "Let's Dip" | A. Yates, S. Watson | Seven, Krizz Kaliko | 03:40 |
| 17. | "Collect" (featuring Kutt Calhoun) | A. Yates, M. Calhoun, S. Watson | Seven | 03:50 |
| 18. | "Saucy" | S. Watson | Seven, Krizz Kaliko | 04:10 |
| 19. | "If I Ever Go" | M. Calhoun, S. Watson | Young Fyre | 04:29 |
| 20. | "The Ride II (Skit)" | A. Yates | Robert Rebeck | 00:23 |
| 21. | "Where You Want Me" (featuring Kutt Calhoun & Tech N9ne) | M. Calhoun, S. Watson | Seven, Krizz Kaliko | 03:44 |
| Total length: | | | | 74:10 |

FYE pre-order digital bonus track
| No. | Title | Producer(s) | Length |
|---|---|---|---|
| 22. | "In Da Whip" | Seven | 04:04 |
