= Why Stop Now (Busta Rhymes song) =

Single by Busta Rhymes featuring Chris Brown

from the album Anarchy 2
- Released: November 16, 2011
- Recorded: 2011
- Genre: Hip hop
- Length: 4:00
- Label: Conglomerate Records, Cash Money Records
- Songwriter(s): Trevor Smith, Jr., Sham Joseph, Chris Brown
- Producer(s): Sham "Sak Pase" Joseph

Busta Rhymes singles chronology
"Worldwide Choppers" (2011)	"Why Stop Now" (2011)	"Pride N Joy" (2012)

Chris Brown singles chronology
"Strip" (2011)	"Why Stop Now" (2011)	"Turn Up the Music" (2012)

"Why Stop Now" is a song by American rapper Busta Rhymes, released November 16, 2011, as a promotional single. The song, produced by Sak Pase, features fellow American singer Chris Brown. Busta Rhymes uses his signature fast-paced rapping in all three verses, over production that contains elements of techno music. Chris Brown raps the chorus with aggression. The song was released after his last single "Stop the Party" which featured American rapper and record producer Swizz Beatz. The song was released as a free launch exclusive for Google Music, and is only available digitally through that marketplace.

== Remix ==
The official remix features Chris Brown, Lil Wayne, and Missy Elliott was released on February 15, 2012.

== Chart performance ==
Chart (2011)	Peak position
US Billboard Hot R&B/Hip-Hop Songs	84
