= Twisted Insane =

American rapper

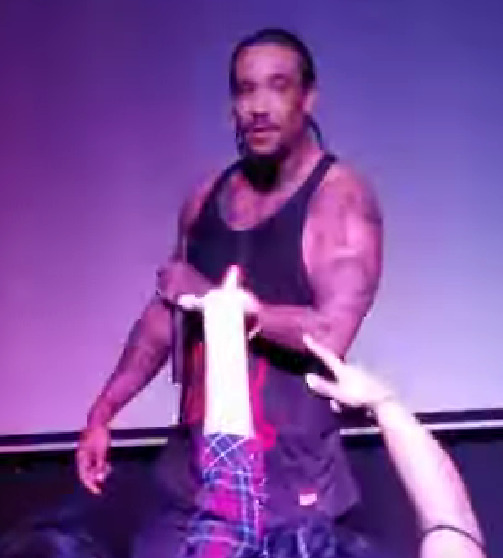
- Johnson performing in 2019

Background information
- Born: Michael Johnson; September 22, 1983 (age 43)
- Genres: Hip hop; chopper; horrorcore
- Occupations: Rapper; songwriter
- Years active: 1996–present
- Label: Brainsick Muzik
- Website: twistedinsane.bigcartel.com

Michael Johnson, better known by his stage name as Twisted Insane, is an American rapper from San Diego, California. He is Married to Lady Insane and has children. He has released fifteen studio albums. He founded the record label Brainsick Muzik, signing other rappers.

== Early life ==
Johnson was born in San Diego, California. By the age of 12, he had begun writing rhymes, and has said that after his first live performance he was overwhelmed with emotion from the euphoric experience, and "immediately became addicted to performing live". He left home and began traveling around the United States, selling albums. When his first album, Shoot for the Face, came out in 2006, he was homeless at the time. His first mixtape came out in 2004 Brainmatter.

== Career ==
Johnson raps in the Chopper style, a fast-paced style that originated in the Midwestern United States. He may have been influenced by fellow artists Bone Thugs-n-Harmony, Twista and Busta Rhymes . He grew a cult following. His first studio album, Shoot for the Face, was released in 2006 and included 21 songs, featuring Catmando, Guaran-T, West Craven, T-Nutty, Lil Face and Bleezo. His second album, The Monster in the Dark, was released in 2007, containing 18 songs, featuring Mitchy Slick, Spice 1, Uncle B, Young Bop, Marvaless, Zigg Zagg and C-Bo.

After featuring on Tech N9ne's single "Worldwide Choppers" in May 2011, alongside well-known rappers such as Busta Rhymes and Twista, he was introduced to a much wider fanbase across the world. The song remains Johnson's biggest hit so far in the United States, peaking at #15 on the Billboard U.S. Heatseekers Songs chart, #30 on the R&B/Hip-Hop Digital Song Sales chart and #4 on the Bubbling Under Hot 100. Following on from this, in October 2011 he released his third album, The Root of All Evil, which was 18 tracks long and featured Chris Ray, Ric Nutt, Zigg Zagg, Marvaless, Key Loom, Bishop, C-Bo, Ise B, Ms. Karamel and T-Nutty.

In June 2013, Johnson released his fourth album, The Insane Asylum, including 20 songs, featuring Charles Xavier, Firing Squad, C Mob, Mitchy Slick, Key Loom, Redro Killson, Bishop, Bleezo, Kung Fu Vampire, Poverty's Posterboy, West Craven, Hurricane, Mr. Dos Muchos, Troll, D-Loc The Gill God, Crucified and Z. In July that year he was featured on the lead single of Tech N9ne's album Something Else, "So Dope (They Wanna)" alongside Wrekonize and Snow Tha Product. He was also featured in the music video for this track.

In 2014, Johnson released The Last Demon, his fifth album, with 22 tracks, including collaborations with artists Rittz, JellyRoll, Charlie Ray, Khadijah Lopez, Iso, Kamikazi and Aqualeo. Voodoo, his sixth album, was released in 2015, and had 20 tracks, including guest appearances from Redro Killson, Jarren Benton, Khadijah Lopez, Dayo G, Qlayz, Tanqueray Locc, Bleezo and Charlie Ray. In 2016, he released a collaboration album with Charlie Ray, The Gatekeeper and the Keymaster, with 15 songs also featuring T Nutty. In the same year he released a solo album entitled Shoot for the Face 2, a sequel to his first album with 18 tracks, featuring Dalima, Kamikazi, Charlie Ray, Dikulz, Brotha Lynch Hung, Blayne and rapper Lyrikal. In My Darkest Hour, released in 2017, included 19 tracks, and C-Mob, Z, Dayo G and Charlie Ray are credited as performers. His next two albums, Sickopatomous and Sick James, were released in September 2019 on Friday the 13th, featuring C. Ray, Dayo G., Lady Insane, Brodie James, Jada Lynn, Tanqueray Loc, Dikulz, Bleezo, and Z, while Sick James featured Rittz, Dayo G., Ryan Anthony, Swisher Sleep, Big June, C. Ray, Brotha Lynch Hung, Ice B, Cutty Dre, and Buk of Psychodrama.

== Discography ==
=== Studio albums ===
List of studio albums
Title	Album details
Shoot for the Face	Released: 2006; Label: Brainsick Muzik; Format: CD, Streaming
The Monster in the Dark	Released: October 31, 2007; Label: Brainsick Muzik; Format: CD, Streaming
The Root of All Evil	Released: October 31, 2011; Label: Brainsick Muzik; Format: CD, Streaming
The Insane Asylum	Released: June 4, 2013; Label: Brainsick Muzik; Format: CD, Streaming
The Last Demon	Released: June 13, 2014; Label: Brainsick Muzik; Format: CD, Streaming
Voodoo	Released: October 31, 2015; Label: Brainsick Muzik; Format: CD, Streaming
Shoot for the Face 2	Released: December 31, 2016; Label: Brainsick Muzik; Format: CD, Streaming
In My Darkest Hour	Released: October 31, 2017; Label: Brainsick Muzik; Format: CD, Streaming
Sick James	Released: September 13, 2019; Label: Brainsick Muzik; Format: CD, Streaming
Sickopatomous	Released: September 13, 2019; Label: Brainsick Muzik; Format: CD, Streaming
The Tales of Michael Johnson	Released: August 26, 2020; Label: Brainsick Muzik; Format: Streaming
The Night Before Christmas	Released: December 22, 2020; Label: Brainsick Muzik; Format: Streaming
Voodoo 2	Released: October 30, 2021; Label: Brainsick Muzik; Format: Streaming
Voodoo 3	Released: October 30, 2021; Label: Brainsick Muzik; Format: Streaming
The Reaper	Released: October 13, 2023; Label: Brainsick Muzik; Format: CD, Streaming
Shoot for the Face 2.5	Released: July 5, 2024; Label: Brainsick Muzik; Format: Streaming
Halfway Gone	Released: October 4, 2024; Label: Brainsick Muzik; Format: Streaming
Napalm	Released: December 20, 2024; Label: Brainsick Muzik; Format: Streaming
The Reaper 2	Released: September 2026; Label: Brainsick Muzik; Format: Flash Drive

=== Mixtapes ===
List of mixtapes
Title	Album details
Tales from My Mortuary	Released: 1999; Label: Brainsick Muzik; Format: Digital download
The Devil Made Me Do It	Released: 2001; Label: Brainsick Muzik; Format: CD
Brainmatter	Released: 1999-2001?; Label: Brainsick Muzik; Format: CD
The Essence of Evil	Released: 2005; Label: Brainsick Muzik; Format: CD
The Hell's Kitchen	Released: 2009?; Label: Brainsick Muzik; Format: CD, digital download

=== Compilation albums ===
List of compilation albums
Title	Album details
The Ultimate Collection	Released: 2017; Label: Brainsick Muzik; Format: Flash Drive
Red Collection	Released: 2019; Label: Brainsick Muzik; Format: Flash Drive
Twisted Insane, Vol. 1	Released: July 17, 2019; Label: Brainsick Muzik; Format: Streaming

=== Collaborative albums ===
List of collaborative albums
Title	Album details
The Gatekeeper and the Keymaster (with C. Ray)	Released: October 31, 2016; Label: Brainsick Muzik; Format: Streaming
Love After Lockup (with Lady Insane)	Released: June 1, 2023; Label: Brainsick Muzik; Format: Streaming
Set It Off (with Swisher Sleep)	Released: April 24, 2026; Label: Brainsick Muzik/Swishpack Music; Format: Streaming

Bracker Barrel with King Iso, yet to be released

=== Select guest appearances ===
Year	Single	Peak position	Certification
Year	Single	US	Certification
2011	"Worldwide Choppers" (Tech N9ne featuring Busta Rhymes, Yelawolf, Twista, U$O, Ceza, D-Loc the Gill God, JL of B.Hood, and Twisted Insane)	104 (Note: "Worldwide Choppers" did not enter the Billboard Hot 100, but peaked at number four on the Bubbling Under Hot 100 Singles chart.)	
2013	"So Dope (They Wanna)" (Tech N9ne featuring Wrekonize, Twisted Insane, and Snow Tha Product)	—	—
2017	"Thron" (ShimmyMC featuring Wrekonize and Twisted Insane)	—	—
2020	"BACK TO HELL, PT 3" (Skalli43 featuring Kamikazi, KonDa, Loc Saint, Basstard, RcThaHazard and Twisted Insane)	—	—
2021	"High Tension" (Code: Pandorum featuring Twisted Insane)	—	—
2022	"Cathedral of Dracul" (Sold Soul featuring Twisted Insane)		
2023	"Revolt" (INHUMAN featuring Twisted Insane)		
"—" denotes a recording that did not chart or was not released in that territory.
