= Big Scoob =

American rapper

- Born: Stewart Duane Ashby Jr. May 9, 1973 (age 53)
- Origin: Kansas City, Missouri
- Genres: Gangsta Rap
- Occupation: Rapper
- Years active: 1997–present
- Label: Strange Music
- Website: http://www.bigscoob.com

Stewart Duane Ashby Jr. (born May 9, 1973), better known by his stage name Big Scoob, is an American rapper from Kansas City, Missouri, who records for Strange Music.

== Musical career ==
=== Early career ===
Along with fellow Kansas City natives Tech N9ne, Bakarii, Short Nitty and Txx Will, he formed the 57th Street Rogue Dog Villains, a group that released a handful of albums during the late 1990s and early 2000s. Frustrated with the industry, Scoob left music and focused on raising his daughters.

=== Return to music and signing to Strange Music ===
After a few years of dormancy, Big Scoob was convinced by Tech N9ne to return to the music industry. On February 7, 2009, it was announced on Tech N9ne's official website that Big Scoob had signed to his independent record label, Strange Music.

=== Releases ===
On September 15, 2009, Big Scoob released his debut studio album Monsterifik through Strange Music. The album was released under the "Tech N9ne Presents" banner, making it the second album to have this introduction banner following Krizz Kaliko's debut album. Features on this album include 8Ball & MJG, B-Legit, Johnny Richter of the Kottonmouth Kings, 1 Ton of Potluck and Irv Da Phenom, along with Strange Music labelmates Tech N9ne, Krizz Kaliko, former Strange Music artists Kutt Calhoun, Skatterman, and 57th Street Rogue Dog Villains members Bakarri (as Mr. Whitebear) & Txx Will. The album debuted number 67 on the Billboard Top R&B/Hip-Hop Albums.

Big Scoob released his sophomore album Damn Fool on May 3, 2011. Guests on the album include Glasses Malone, Bumpy Knuckles, Chillest Illest, Krizz Kaliko, Tech N9ne, Messy Marv, T-Nutty, Skatterman and Jay Rock. The album debuted number 49 on the Billboard Top R&B/Hip-Hop Albums and number 24 on the Billboard Top Rap Albums.

On September 20, 2011, Big Scoob released the No Filter EP. The EP features Kutt Calhoun, BG Bulletwound, and Irv Da Phenom.

It was stated by Tech N9ne in an interview with The Source that Big Scoob no longer wished to make any more projects because "these kids don't understand what he's talking about." However, he still appears on other rappers' albums, including Tech N9ne's albums. After the release of Tech N9ne's sixth Collabos album Strangeulation Vol. II, Big Scoob confirmed that he is currently working on his next album. He stated in a Twitter post that his last two albums had too many outside sources, including Tech N9ne's fans, the streets, and Strange Music, thus making them "mediocre."

== Discography ==
=== Studio albums ===
Title	Album details	Peak chart positions		
Title	Album details	US	US R&B	US Rap
Monsterifik	Released: September 15, 2009; Label: Strange Music; Format: CD, digital download	—	67	—
Damn Fool	Released: May 3, 2011; Label: Strange Music; Format: CD, digital download	—	—	—
H.O.G.	Released: November 4, 2016; Label: Strange Music; Format: CD, digital download	—	—	—
Duality	Released: May 25, 2018; Label: Strange Music; Format: CD, digital download	—	—	—

=== Collaborative albums ===
Title	Album details
It's On Now (with 57th Street Rogue Dog Villians)	Released: 1998; Label: Hog Style; Format: CD, digital download
My Dogs For Life (with 57th Street Rogue Dog Villians)	Released: 1999; Label: Hog Style; Format: CD, digital download
Roguish Ways (with 57th Street Rogue Dog Villians)	Released: 2002; Label: Hog Style; Format: CD, digital download
New World Hustle (with 57th Street Rogue Dog Villians)	Released: 2007; Label: Roguish; Format: CD, digital download

=== Extended plays ===
Title	EP details
No Filter	Released: September 20, 2011; Label: Strange Music; Format: CD, digital download

=== Mixtapes ===
Title	Mixtape details
Dope Talk Volume 1	Released: May 1, 2012; Label: Hog Style; Format: CD, digital download
Dope Talk Volume 2	Released: June 1, 2012; Label: Hog Style; Format: CD, digital download

=== Singles ===
Title	Year	Album
"No More Mr. Nice Guy"	2003	Non-album single
"All I Kno Is Hood"	2011	Damn Fool
"AKKA Damn Fool"	2011	Damn Fool
"B*tch Please"	2016	H.O.G.
"Walk the Line"	2016	H.O.G.
"Warrior"	2016	H.O.G.
"Soul Musik"	2016	H.O.G.
"Up & Down" (featuring Boogieman)	2017	Non-album single
"T.R.A.P.(Pack Gone)" (featuring B-Legit, Boogieman)	2018	Duality
"On Me" (featuring Tech N9ne)	2018	Non-album singles

=== Guest appearances ===
Title	Year	Other artist(s)	Album
"Soldiers At War"	1999	Tech N9ne, Don Juan, L.V., Short Nitty	The Calm Before the Storm
"Constantly Dirty"	2002	Tech N9ne, 57th Street Rogue Dog Villains	Absolute Power
"2 Piece"	2007	Tech N9ne, Joe Vertigo, Krizz Kaliko	Misery Loves Kompany
"Big Scoob"	2007	Tech N9ne	Misery Loves Kompany
"Beat You Up"	2008	Tech N9ne, Lebowski, The Weapon	Killer
"Salute"	2008	Messy Marv, Krizz Kaliko, Tech N9ne	Draped Up & Chipped Out, Vol. 3
"Nothin'"	2009	Tech N9ne, Messy Marv	Sickology 101
"Sorry N' Sh*t"	2009	Tech N9ne, 57th Street Rogue Dog Villains	Sickology 101
"Dysfunctional"	2009	Tech N9ne, Krizz Kaliko	Sickology 101
"B. Boy"	2009	Tech N9ne, Bumpy Knuckles, Kutt Calhoun, Skatterman	K.O.D.
"Street Life"	2009	D-Locc da Chop & Cash Image	Red Rags & Blue Flags
"Be Right Back"	2009	Krizz Kaliko, Tech N9ne	Genius
"Gain Green"	2009	Messy Marv, Tech N9ne, Krizz Kaliko	Draped Up & Chipped Out, Vol. 4
"L.A., CA 2 K.C., MO"	2009	Mykill Miers	Take It In Blood
"How I Feel"	2009	Irv da Phenom	Tire Shops & Night Clubs
"Keep It One Hunit"	2010	Tech N9ne, Glasses Malone, Irv da Phenom	The Gates Mixed Plate
"Asshole"	2010	Tech N9ne, Krizz Kaliko	Seepage
"Down For the Block"	2010	Jay Rock, Kutt Calhoun, Tech N9ne	Bad Season
"Stranger"	2010	Cognito, Kutt Calhoun, Loki, Stevie Stone, Tech N9ne	Automatic
"In My Dreams"	2010	Krizz Kaliko, Brotha Lynch Hung	Shock Treatment
"Love Me Tomorrow"	2011	Tech N9ne, Krizz Kaliko	All 6's and 7's
"Bless My Niggaz"	2011	Irv Da Phenom	Dream Big, Hustle Hard, Vol. 1
"Home Invasion"	2011	Tragedy503	Darkside Of The Womb
"Charlie Sheen"	2011	Kutt Calhoun	Red-Headed Stepchild
"Dixie Cup"	2012	Krizz Kaliko, Twiztid	Kickin' and Screamin'
"Stay Alive"	2012	Krizz Kaliko	Kickin' and Screamin'
"Goin' Down"	2012	Stevie Stone, Spaide Ripper	Rollin' Stone
"With the BS"	2013	Tech N9ne, Red Cafe, Trae tha Truth	Something Else
"Red Rags"	2014	Tech N9ne, Kutt Calhoun, Jay Rock	Strangeulation
"Strangeulation IV"	2014	Rittz, Prozak, Krizz Kaliko	Strangeulation
"Bass Ackwards"	2015	Tech N9ne, Yo Gotti, Lil Wayne	Special Effects
"Push Start"	2015	Tech N9ne	Strangeulation Vol. II
"Strangeulation Vol. II Cypher III"	2015	JL B.Hood	Strangeulation Vol. II
"Buss Serves"	2016	Tech N9ne, Young Devi D	The Storm
"Let's Link"	2017	Tech N9ne	Strange Reign
"Let's Go"	2017	Tech N9ne, Darrien Safron	Strange Reign
"Quicksand"	2017	Godemis, Stevie Stone	Strange Reign

=== Music videos ===
Year	Title	Director
2009	"Salue" (Ft. Tech N9ne)	
2011	"All I Kno Is Hood" (Ft. Krizz Kaliko)	Dan Gedman (Liquid 9)
2012	"Real Cocky"	
2015	"Strangeulation Vol. II Cypher III" (Tech N9ne Ft. Big Scoob, JL B. Hood)	
2015	"Push Start" (Tech N9ne Ft. Big Scoob)	
