= Mike Dupree (music producer) =

Mike Dupree is a multi-platinum music producer and songwriter from Kansas City, Missouri, United States. Formerly known as Emaydee (M80), he has produced for and/or worked with Kendrick Lamar, Rick Ross, TI, Trey Songz, Young Jeezy, Snoop Dogg, Tech N9ne, Sevyn Streeter, Verse Simmons, K. Michelle, Mod Sun, Chris Blue, EXO-SC among others.
