= Sickology 101 =

Studio album by Tech N9ne
- Released: April 28, 2009
- Genre: Hip-hop
- Length: 1:15:35
- Label: Strange Music
- Producers: Matic Lee; Wyshmaster; Young Fyre; Seven

Tech N9ne chronology
Killer (2008)	Sickology 101 (2009)	Tech N9ne: The Box Set (2009)

Tech N9ne Collabos chronology
Misery Loves Kompany (2007)	Sickology 101 (2009)	The Gates Mixed Plate (2010)

Singles from Sickology 101
- 1. "Red Nose" Released: March 31, 2009; 2. "Sickology 101" Released: March 31, 2009; 3. "Nothin'" Released: April 14, 2009

Professional ratings
Review scores
Source	Rating
AllMusic	3.5/5 stars
DJBooth	4/5 stars
HipHopDX	3.5/5 stars
RapReviews	(7.5/10)

Sickology 101 is the eighth studio album, and the second in the "Collabos" series, by rapper Tech N9ne.

Early on, the album carried a "The Study of Being Sick" subtitle, but as its release grew nearer, the subtitle was phased out. The album features guest appearances from Krayzie Bone, Crooked I, Chino XL, Messy Marv, Ron Ron, Potluck, also featured are fellow Kansas City rappers Cash Image, D-Locc Da Chop and the 57th Street Rogue Dog Villians. Furthermore, fellow Strange Music rappers Krizz Kaliko, Kutt Calhoun and Big Scoob are featured. It features production by producers that have previously collaborated with Tech, like Tramaine "Young Fyre" Winfrey, Jonah "Matic Lee" Appleby, Adam "Wyshmaster" Cherrington, and Michael "Seven" Summers, with additional production alongside Young Fyre, like Josh "Karbon" Brunstetter and Brian "Yung Fokus" Reid. The additional production credits were absent from the copies of the album in the initial pressing, but were added in subsequent pressings.

Both "Red Nose" and "Sickology 101" were released as digital singles on March 31, 2009, while "Nothin'" followed as a digital single on April 14, 2009. On March 24, 2009, the music video for "Red Nose" was added to YouTube by Strange Music's account in high-definition video. On April 13, 2009, the video premiered on MTVU.com. The video was directed by Dan Gedman.

The initial numbers released by Nielsen SoundScan for the albums' debut week were 18,680 which would have put the album at #23 on the Billboard 200. However, according to a news report by HipHopDX, Strange Music submitted proof, indicating the number to be 21,455 copies sold first week. As a result, Sickology 101 actually debuted on the Billboard 200 at No. 19. As of 2013, the album sold 118,000 units.

On 17 June 2020, "Dysfunctional" featuring Krizz Kaliko and Big Scoob was certified gold by the RIAA.

== Track listing ==
No.	Title	Writer(s)	Producer(s)	Length
1.	"Sickology 101" (featuring Chino XL & Crooked I)	Aaron Yates, Derek Barbosa, Dominick Wickliffe	Wyshmaster	03:43
2.	"Midwest Choppers 2" (featuring K-Dean & Krayzie Bone)	Anthony Henderson, A. Yates, K. Dean, Samuel Watson IV	Young Fyre, Karbon	04:34
3.	"Ghetto Love" (featuring Krizz Kaliko & Kutt Calhoun)	A. Yates, Melvin Calhoun, S. Watson	Young Fyre, Karbon	05:15
4.	"Poh Me Anutha" (featuring Kutt Calhoun & Potluck)	A. Yates, James Kerri, Joshua Liederman, M. Calhoun, S. Watson	Young Fyre, Yung Fokus	04:09
5.	"We Kixin' It" (featuring Ron Ron & The Popper)	A. Yates, Ronald White, Walter Edwin	Young Fyre	03:43
6.	"Nothin'" (featuring Big Scoob & Messy Marv)	A. Yates, Marvin Watson, Stewart Ashby Jr.	Matic Lee	03:46
7.	"Let Me In" (featuring Cash Image, D-Locc Da Chop, & Krizz Kaliko)	A. Yates, Derius Taylor, Derwayne Williams, S. Watson	Young Fyre, Karbon	05:53
8.	"In the Air" (featuring Craig Smith & Nesto the Owner)	A. Yates, Craig Smith, Ernesto Edwards	Wyshmaster	04:18
9.	"Blown Away"	A. Yates, Brian Fraser, Manzilla Queen	Young Fyre	04:51
10.	"Party & Bullshit" (featuring Big Ben, Shadow & Krizz Kaliko)	A. Yates, Ben Olney, Gerald Washington, S. Watson	Young Fyre	04:25
11.	"Grammy's (Skit)" (featuring Below Zero, Chandra Palmer, Dana Perkins, Irv Da Phenom, Krizz Kaliko, Rob Rebeck & Valerie Knight)	M. Queen	Rob Rebeck	01:14
12.	"Sorry N' Shit" (featuring 57th Street Rogue Dog Villians)	A. Yates, M. Whitebear, S. Ashby Jr., William Oats	Matic Lee	05:50
13.	"Dysfunctional" (featuring Big Scoob & Krizz Kaliko)	A. Yates, S. Ashby Jr., S. Watson	Matic Lee	04:00
14.	"Far Away" (featuring Krizz Kaliko)	A. Yates, S. Watson	Matic Lee	03:38
15.	"Spelling Bee (Skit)" (featuring Makzilla & Rob Rebeck)	M. Queen	Rob Rebeck	01:15
16.	"Creepin'" (featuring B.G. Bulletwound & Paul Mussan)	A. Yates, Gregory Roland, Paul Sowell, S. Watson	Seven	05:05
17.	"Red Nose"	A. Yates, M. Queen	Matic Lee	05:27
18.	"Bootlegger (Skit) / Areola / Bootlegger (Outro)" (performed by 816 Boyz) (Bonus track))	A. Yates, M. Calhoun, M. Queen, S. Watson	Matic Lee (Areola); Rob Rebeck (Skit / Outro)	04:29
Total length:				75:35

Strange Music pre-order digital bonus track
No.	Title	Producer(s)	Length
19.	"Take It Off" (featuring K-Dean & Lady Q)	Seven	05:09
Total length:			80:44

== Charts ==
Chart performance for Sickology 101
Chart (2009)	Peak position
US Billboard 200	19
US Independent Albums (Billboard)	2
US Top R&B/Hip-Hop Albums (Billboard)	12

== Release history ==
Region	Date	Format(s)	Label
Various	April 28, 2009	Digital download; streaming; CD	Strange Music
