= Young Fyre =

- Also known as: Fyre
- Born: Tramaine Winfrey; March 9, 1986 (age 39); Des Moines, Iowa, U.S.
- Genres: Hip hop, R&B, pop, alternative hip hop
- Occupations: Record producer; songwriter
- Labels: Nappy Boy Entertainment (2010–present)

Tramaine Winfrey (born March 9, 1986), known professionally as Young Fyre, is an American record producer from Des Moines, Iowa. He began his career as an in-house producer T-Pain's label Nappy Boy Entertainment in 2010, and has since worked extensively with rappers Jaden Smith and Trinidad James. He founded AudeoBox in 2019, a plugin and sound pack technology company for professional producers.

Young Fyre has produced for artists including Britney Spears, Tech N9ne, Krizz Kaliko, Busta Rhymes, Big Time Rush, Nicky Jam, Tank, Rico Love, Will Smith, ASAP Rocky, Kehlani, Cousin Stizz, Marc Anthony, Young Buck, Bad Bunny, Benny Benassi, Tamar Braxton, and The OMG Girlz, among others. His credits include T-Pain's singles "Best Love Song", "Rap Song" and "Booty Wurk (One Cheek at a Time)", Britney Spears' singles "Private Show" and "What You Need", and Lil' Wayne's "How to Hate".

== Early life ==
Young Fyre was born and raised in Des Moines, Iowa. Although most of the music popular in Iowa was pop, rock, and country, Winfrey's parents listened to R&B at home, and he began to experiment with the keyboard when his grandmother purchased one when he was 10. From there, he pursued his passion for music. He attributes his unique sound to these varying influences, explaining "the diversity came from listening to everything". He credits his early musical influences as Timbaland, Missy Elliott, and Busta Rhymes.

== Music career ==
=== Early career ===
After years of honing his production skills, Young Fyre first gained recognition on RocBattle.com. After seeing an advertisement for the competition in a copy of XXL, he created a profile and devised a methodical plan to win his battles. Young Fyre posted a beat battle record of 233–9, becoming Grand Champ and defeated established champion Rockwilder. His success on RocBattle gained him recognition in the hip hop community and eventually led to collaborations with numerous rappers in the Midwestern United States.

=== First Placements ===
From 2008 to 2009, Young Fyre produced 17 tracks across Tech N9ne's Killer, Sickology 101 and K.O.D. albums, including the single "Like Yeah". He also produced 6 tracks on Kutt Calhoun's Feature Presentation and 3 tracks on Big Scoob's Monsterifik, as well as 1 track each for Young Buck and Yung Berg.

=== Nappy Boy Entertainment ===
In 2010, Nappy Boy Entertainment rapper Young Cash (Joey Galaxy) heard Young Fyre's music and joined him on a Skype call along with label founder/owner T-Pain, who called the producer and offered to fly him to Miami for a meeting, where Young Fyre was introduced to industry names like Timbaland at The Hit Factory Criteria Miami.

After signing with Nappy Boy Entertainment, Young Fyre began working with T-Pain and the rest of the Nappy Boy Entertainment roster. He produced the official remix of Travie McCoy's hit song "Billionaire" featuring Bruno Mars. The remix features T-Pain, One Chance & Gucci Mane. He also produced One Chance's "Sexin' On You", Brandon T. Jackson's "Imma Do It Big" featuring T-Pain & One Chance, and Italian electro house DJ/producer Benny Benassi's "Electroman" featuring T-Pain.

In 2011, Young Fyre produced the majority of T-Pain's album Revolver, including "Best Love Song" featuring Chris Brown, "Rap Song" featuring Rick Ross, and "Booty Wurk (One Cheek At a Time)" featuring Joey Galaxy, which were released as singles. Of his work with T-Pain on Revolver, Young Fyre explained, "Our chemistry is unbelievable. It's a joint effort on every song and it's a beautiful thing".

In 2017, Nappy Boy Entertainment filed a lawsuit against Cash Money Records for unpaid royalties for T-Pain and Young Fyre's work on Lil Wayne's Tha Carter III (2008) and Tha Carter IV (2011).

=== 2011 to 2019 ===
After his work on Revolver, Young Fyre continued to produce, write, and occasionally provide vocals for a variety of artists. In 2015, he was temporarily sidelined by a hip injury, but he continued to create throughout his recovery. In 2016, he produced "Private Show", a track on Britney Spears' ninth studio album Glory, released in August that year, on which he is credited as a producer and composer. It was around this time when Young Fyre was introduced to Jaden Smith, through Fyre's mentor Omarr Rambert. Young Fyre went on to produce Jaden's 2017 album Syre in addition to working with Will Smith on several projects.

=== AudeoBox ===
After his injury in 2015, Young Fyre experimented with sound manipulation during his recovery, combining effects he was using in his own work and enlisting the help of a graphic designer and coder to launch music technology company AudeoBox, with the goal of developing streamlined, simple, and professional plugins and sample packs for artists and creatives involved in music production. In July 2021, in partnership with Splice, AudeoBox launched the comedic web series In The Box, created and directed by Young Fyre, which highlights influential producers and artists in the industry.

=== Trinidad James ===
Young Fyre began collaborating with Trinidadian-American rapper Trinidad James in 2015, and the two worked together on James' Father Figga and Daddy Issues mixtapes. Young Fyre (with Splice's In The Box and Fyre's agency Damn Good Bros) also worked as creative director for ad campaigns for James' brand DADSocks. In August 2021, Fyre and Trinidad James released the album Black Filter to industry acclaim.

== Production credits ==
Production Credits
| Year | Artist | Album | Song Title |
|---|---|---|---|
| 2011 | CHISENGA (FKA) Crisis Mr. Swagger | Business Is Good | "Larger Than Life" |
| 2008 | Young Buck | | "My Chevy" |
| Unknown | Yung Berg | | |
| 2008 | Kutt Calhoun | Feature Presentation | "Feature Presentation Intro" "Bunk Rock Bitch" (Single) "Killa City" feat. E-Skool, Jerita Streater, Paul Mussan & The Popper "Stop Jeffin" feat. BG Bulletwound, Krizz Kaliko & Tech N9ne "Good Friend" feat. Krizz Kaliko "School Daze" feat. Krizz Kaliko & Tech N9ne |
| 2009 | Big Scoob | Monsterifik | "Stik @Move" feat. Krizz Kaliko, Mr. Whitebear, Tech N9ne & Txx Will "Big Fella" |
| 2008 | Tech N9ne | Killer | "Like Yeah" (Single) "Wheaties" feat. Shawnna "Attention" "Holier Than Thou" |
| 2009 | Tech N9ne | Sickology 101 | "Midwest Choppers 2" feat. Krayzie Bone & K-Dean "Ghetto Love" feat. Krizz Kaliko & Kutt Calhoun "Poh Me Anutha" feat. Potluck & Kutt Calhoun "We Kixin It" feat. Ron Ron & The Popper "Let Me In" feat. Cash Image & D-Loc Da Chop "Blown Away" "Party & Bullshit" feat. Big Ben & Shadow |
| 2009 | Tech N9ne | K.O.D. | "Strange Music Box" feat. Brotha Lynch Hung & Krizz Kaliko "Check Yo Temperature" feat. Sundae & T-Nutty "B. Boy" feat. Big Scoob, Bumpy Knuckles, Kutt Calhoun & Skatterman "Hunterish" feat. Krizz Kaliko & Irv Da Penom "Leave Me Alone" (Single) "The Martini" feat. Krizz Kaliko |
| 2010 | Tech N9ne | The Gates Mixed Plate | "F U Pay Me" feat. Krizz Kaliko & Makzilla "Jumpin' Jax" feat. Stevie Stone & Krizz Kaliko "Keep It One Hunit" feat. Big Scoob, Glasses Malone & Irv da Phenom |
| 2010 | Lil Chuckee | Charles Lee Ray (Mixtape) | "Believe It" feat. T-Pain |
| 2010 | Rick Ross | Ashes To Ashes (Mixtape) | "Retrosuperfuture" feat. Wiz Khalifa |
| 2010 | Young Cash | Fed Bound (Mixtape) | "Fed Bound" "That's How It Goes" feat. 28 "Red Lobster" "Up That Fire" "Goin In" "Kick Door" "She's A Animal" |
| 2010 | Young Cash | The Vacation (Mixtape) | "Amber Rose" "Slow Motion" feat. T-Pain |
| Unknown | Eric Bellinger | | "The Messenger" |
| 2010 | Travie McCoy | Lazarus | "Billionaire (Official Remix)" feat. Bruno Mars, T-Pain, One Chance & Gucci Mane |
| 2011 | Tay Dizm | Thank You For Being A Friend (Mixtape) | "Swagger Up " feat. Joey Galaxy "Best (Go Hard)" |
| 2011 | Benny Benassi | Electroman | "Electroman" feat. T-Pain (Single) |
| 2011 | One Chance | Ain't No Room for Talkin' | "Sexin On You" (Single) "Encore" "Cowabunga" |
| 2011 | One Chance | | "Greatest Escape" "Pass Out" "Perfect Melody" "To The Middle" "Pricey" "Invincible" |
| 2011 | SCR | Let's Go In EP | "Let's Go In" |
| 2011 | Brandon T. Jackson | Imma Do It Big (Single) | "Imma Do It Big" feat. T-Pain & One Chance (Single) |
| 2011 | T-Pain | RevolveR | "Best Love Song" feat. Chris Brown (Single) "Default Picture" "I Don't Give a Fuk" "Nuthin'" feat. E-40 & Detail |
| 2011 | T-Pain | prEVOLVEr | "Speech" feat. Birdman "I Done Showed You" feat. Field Mob, One Chance "Hoes And Ladies" feat. Smoke, Lil Wayne (Single) "Danger" "Muffuga" "So Much Pain" feat. One Chance "What?" "Motivated" feat. P.L. Official, B. Martin "Yasimelike" feat. One Chance "Hit 'Em Wit It" feat. Severe "Nightmare" feat. One Chance "Money Dance" feat. One Chance "I'm Just Sayin" "Out the Hood" feat. Brisco, Young Cash "Top Flight Sex" feat. Young Cash |
| 2011 | T-Pain | | "Rap Song" feat. Rick Ross (Promo Single) "Booty Wurk (One Cheek At a Time)" feat. Joey Galaxy (Promo Single) "Jungle Booty" feat. Akon & Busta Rhymes "I'm Dancin" feat. Flo Rida "Who Want It" feat. Severe Da Young Drack "Bring The Club Back (Do It)'" feat. Petey Pablo, Magoo, Fatman Scoop & Lil Jon |
| 2011 | Ace Hood | Blood, Sweat & Tears | "King of the Streets" feat. T-Pain |
| 2011 | Lil Wayne | Tha Carter IV | "How to Hate" feat. T-Pain |
| 2011 | Keith Sweat | Til the Morning | "To The Middle" feat. T-Pain |
| 2012 | Krizz Kaliko | Kickin' and Screamin' | "Dumb For You" feat. T-Pain "Stay Alive" feat. Big Scoob |
| 2013 | Omarion | Paradise | |
| 2013 | Tamar Braxton | Love and War | "Thank You Lord" |
| 2014 | Tank | Stronger | "Hope This Makes You Love Me" |
| 2016 | Britney Spears | Glory | "Private Show" "What You Need" |
| 2016 | Will Smith | | "Caution in the Wild" |
| 2017 | Jaden | Syre | "Batman" "Watch Me" "George Jeff" "Falcon" (Addtl. Drums) |
| 2019 | Jaden | Erys | "Mission" "Chateau" |
