= Rittz discography =

- Studio albums: 8
- EPs: 2
- Singles: 31
- Music videos: 13
- Mixtapes: 2

The discography of Rittz, an American hip hop artist, consists of eight studio albums, two extended plays, two mixtapes, thirty-one singles and thirteen music videos.

== Albums ==
=== Studio albums ===
List of studio albums, with selected chart positions and sales figures
Title	Album details	Peak chart positions			Sales
Title	Album details	US	US R&B	US Rap	Sales
The Life and Times of Jonny Valiant	Released: April 30, 2013; Label: Strange Music; Format: CD, digital download	25	8	5	
Next to Nothing	Released: September 9, 2014; Label: Strange Music; Format: CD, digital download	14	3	3	US: 62,000
Top of the Line	Released: May 6, 2016; Label: Strange Music; Format: CD, digital download	19	3	2	
Last Call	Released: September 29, 2017; Label: Strange Music; Format: CD, digital download	43	25	17	
Put a Crown on It	Released: November 29, 2019; Label: CNT; Format: CD, digital download	—	—	—	
Picture Perfect	Released: October 9, 2020; Label: CNT; Format: CD, digital download	—	—	—	
Rittzmas	Released: December 4, 2020; Label: CNT; Format: CD, digital download	—	—	—	
MellowLOvation Music	Released: April 7, 2023; Label: CNT; Format: CD, digital download	—	—	—	

== Extended plays ==
Title	EP details
After Mornin' EP	Released: September 29, 2008; Label: Chrome; Format: CD, digital download
S.O.S.	Released: September 17, 2021; Label: CNT; Format: CD, digital download

== Mixtapes ==
Title	Mixtape details
White Jesus	Released: March 8, 2011; Label: Slumerican; Format: CD, digital download
White Jesus: Revival	Released: March 8, 2012; Label: Slumerican; Format: CD, digital download

== Singles ==
=== As lead artist ===
List of singles as lead artist, showing year released and album name
Title	Year	Certifications	Album
"After Mornin'"	2008		After Mornin' EP
"Bloody Murdah" (featuring Tech N9ne)	2012		Non-album single
"Switch Lanes" (featuring Mike Posner)	2013	RIAA: Gold	The Life and Times of Jonny Valiant
"Inside the Groove" (featuring Mike Posner & E-40)	2016		Top of the Line
"Propane" (featuring Devin the Dude & MJG)	2016		Top of the Line
"Ghost Story	2016		Top of the Line
"Walter White Boys 2" (with Bootleg Kev)	2016		Non-album single
"Indestructible"	2017		Last Call
"Dork Rap"	2017		Last Call
"Happy Ending"	2017		Last Call
"Death Wish" (with Mister K.A. Beats)	2017		Non-album singles
"As You Are"	2018		Non-album singles
"Wipe The Slate Clean" (with Big Hud)	2019		Non-album singles
"On Top" (with Merkules & JellyRoll)	2019		Special Occasion
"Toxic"	2019		Put a Crown on It
"Wake Up Call" (featuring Yelawolf & Twista)	2019		Put a Crown on It
"Like This" (with Futuristic)	2020		Still on the Rise
"Dear Rebecca"	2020		Non-album singles
"In My Bones" (with GWANE)	2020		Non-album singles
"No Hope" (with Smoothvega)	2020		Non-album singles
"Never Hold Back" (with Hi-Rez)	2020		Non-album singles
"Locked In" (with Ekoh)	2020		Non-album singles
"Loneliness" (with JellyRoll)	2020		Self Medicated
"Still Standing" (with Stevie Stone & Dan Marsala)	2020		Black Lion
"Picture Perfect" (featuring Tech N9ne)	2020		Picture Perfect
"F****d Up Day"	2020		Picture Perfect
"Jesus Blanco" (featuring Nawf6od)	2020		Picture Perfect
"Better Myself" (with Merkules & Savannah Dexter)	2021		Non-album single
"Keep It Like That" (featuring Vinnie Paz)	2021		S.O.S.
"Dig Deeper"	2021		S.O.S.
"True 2 You Freestyle"	2021		Non-album single

== Other certified songs ==
Title	Year	Certifications	Album
"In My Zone" (feat. Mike Posner & B.o.B.)	2014	RIAA: Gold	Next to Nothing

== Guest appearances ==
List of non-single guest appearances, with other performing artists, showing year released and album name
Title	Year	Other artist(s)	Album
"Box Chevy Pt. 3"	2010	Yelawolf	Trunk Muzik and Trunk Muzik 0-60
"Growin' Up in the Gutter"	2011	Yelawolf	Radioactive
"Far From a Bitch"	2012	Big Hud, Yelawolf, Struggle Jennings	The Long Way Home
"I Ride Dirty"	2012	Big Hud	The Long Way Home
"Out My Face"	2012	Yelawolf, Shawty Fatt	Heart of Dixie
"Whaddup Witcha"	2012	The Mighty Rhino, More Or Les	He Whom The Beat Sets Free Is Free Indeed
"What Is Hip-hop?"	2012	MC Lars, KRS-One, MC chris	The Frosty the Flow Man LP
"King of Tweakers" (Remix)	2012	Rehab	—N/a
"Mayday"	2012	Krizz Kaliko, Chamillionaire	Kickin' and Screamin'
"Boom" (Remix)	2012	Big Snap, Charlie P	—N/a
"Wuddup"	2012	Worldwide	—N/a
"I Dont Give a Fuck"	2012	Big Hud	—N/a
"Trippin'"	2013	Jackie Chain	Bruce Lean Chronicles 2
"Don't Get Mad"	2013	Doe the Unknown	—N/a
"Drank'n Flow"	2013	Playboy Tre	Liquor Store Mascot 2
"Colorado"	2013	Tech N9ne, B.o.B., Ces Cru, Krizz Kaliko, ¡Mayday!, Stevie Stone	Something Else
"The Baptism"	2013	Stevie Stone, Tech N9ne	2 Birds 1 Stone
"Seen Some Thangs"	2013	Caskey	The Transient Classics
"Bowties"	2013	Yelawolf	Black Fall
"Ride On"	2013	Chris Webby	Homegrown
"Let's Take a Ride"	2013	Potluck	The Humboldt Chronicles
"Creature"	2013	Liquid Assassin, Twiztid	Mongrel
"About Me"	2014	JellyRoll	The Biggest Loser (Mixtape)
"Me And My Cadillac"	2014	Bizarre	Lace Blunts 2
"Don’t Know"	2014	A-Laz, Crooked I	Eastie Boy
"Respect My Grind"	2014	Word One	2 Feet And A Heartbeat
"Bad Side (Remix)"	2014	Twiztid	4 The Fam Vol. 2
"Pressure"	2014	Ces Cru	Codename: Ego Stripper
"Make Waves"	2014	Tech N9ne, Krizz Kaliko, Tyler Lyon	Strangeulation
"Na Na"	2014	Tech N9ne, Stevie Stone	Strangeulation
"Strangeulation IV"	2014	Tech N9ne, Prozak, Big Scoob, Stevie Stone	Strangeulation
"Slow To Me"	2015	Tech N9ne, Krizz Kaliko,	Strangeulation Vol. II
"We Just Wanna Party"	2015	Tech N9ne, Darrein Safron	Strangeulation Vol. II
"Strangeulation Vol. II Cypher IV"	2015	Tech N9ne, Krizz Kaliko, Prozak	Strangeulation Vol. II
"Orangutan"	2016	Krizz Kaliko, Wreckonize, Tech N9ne, Ces Cru, JL	GO
"Rubble"	2017	Ces Cru	Catastrophic Events Specialists
"Dazed & Confused"	2017	Chris Webby	Wednesday
"Mo Ammo"	2017	Tech N9ne, Murs	Dominion
"Morning Til the Nightfall"	2017	Tech N9ne, Krizz Kaliko, Wrekonize	Dominion
"Love"	2017	Tech N9ne	Dominion
"Brand New Hunnids"	2017	Tech N9ne, JL, Jeff James	Strange Reign
"Off My Square"	2017	Tech N9ne, ¡Mayday!	Strange Reign
"Terminally ill"	2018	Tech N9ne, KXNG Crooked, Chino XL, Statik Selektah	Forever M.C.
Thanos	2018	The Underground Avengers, Twiztid, Tech N9ne, Krizz Kaliko, JellyRoll, Crucifix & King ISO	Anomaly 88
"B.Y.O.B"	2018	King ISO	Dementia
"All Out"	2018	Snak the Ripper	Off The Rails
"Box Chevy 6"	2019	Yelawolf, DJ Paul, Pimp C	Trunk Muzik III
"On Top"	2019	Merkules, JellyRoll	Special Occasions
"Never Coming Down"	2019	Yelawolf, CookUpBoss	Catfish Billy x Cub Cook Up Boss Slum Trap
"Let Me See It"	2020	Grafh, Bun B	Oracle 3
"In My Bones"	2020	GAWNE	—N/a
"Locked In"	2020	Ekoh	—N/a
"Still Standing"	2020	Stevie Stone, Dan Marsala	Black Lion
"Foolish"	2020	Krizz Kaliko	Legend
"Pirates"	2020	Joey Cool	Coolie High
"Loneliness"	2020	JellyRoll	Self Medicated
"Paved In Gold"	2020	Chris Webby	28 Wednesdays Later
