= Mac Lethal discography =

- Studio albums: 5
- EPs: 7
- Singles: 27
- Mixtapes: 12

The discography of American rapper Mac Lethal consists of 5 studio albums, 12 mixtapes, 7 extended plays, and 27 singles (including nine as a featured artist).

== Albums ==
=== Studio albums ===
List of studio albums, with selected chart positions
| Title | Album details | Peak chart positions |
| Title | Album details | US Heat |
|---|---|---|
| Men Are from Mars, Pornstars Are from Earth | Released: 2002; Label: Self-released; Formats: CD | — |
| 11:11 | Released: October 9, 2007; Label: Rhymesayers; Formats: CD, digital download | 4 |
| Irish Goodbye | Released: December 31, 2011; Label: Black Clover; Formats: CD, digital download | 35 |
| Congratulations | Released: September 13, 2016; Label: Black Clover; Formats: CD, digital download | — |
| Winter Heartbreak II | Released: June 9, 2021; Label: Black Clover; Formats: CD, digital download | — |

=== Mixtapes ===
- The Love Potion Collection (2003)
- The Love Potion Collection 2 (2006)
- The Love Potion Collection 3 (2006)
- The Love Potion Collection 4 (2007)
- The Crown Prime Rib Mixtape (2008)
- The Love Potion Collection 5 (2009)
- Black Clover Presents Aged Barrel Series 1: Original 11:11 (2009)
- Black Clover Presents Aged Barrel Series 2: Moonthinker (2009)
- Blood in the Water Mixtape (2010)
- The Love Potion Collection 6 (2010)
- North Korean BBQ (2011)
- The Love Potion Collection 7: The Hair Years (2011)

== Extended plays ==
- Moon Thinker (2001)
- Nine Situations (2003)
- Digital Love Potion (2008)
- Daytrotter Session (2008)
- Fast as Hell Though (2011)
- The Fred Phelps EP (2011)
- Postcards from Kansas City (2014)

== Singles ==
=== As lead artist ===
List of singles as lead artist, showing year released and album name
| Title | Year | Album |
|---|---|---|
| "Women of Scribble Jam" (with Murs) | 2004 | Scribble Jam Vol 2 |
| "Make Out Bandit" | 2007 | 11:11 |
| "Sun Storm" | 2008 | 11:11 |
| "Undertow" | 2009 | The Love Potion Collection 5 |
| "Lookin Bro" | 2009 | Non-album singles |
| "Nerdy White Kid Kills Look at Me Now" | 2011 | Non-album singles |
| "You're vs. Your" | 2012 | Non-album singles |
| "How to Make Your Own Chick-Fil-A" | 2012 | Non-album singles |
| "Beatbox + iPhone + Guitar + Fast Rap = Win" | 2012 | Non-album singles |
| "Alphabet Insanity" | 2014 | Non-album singles |
| "Incredible Mozart Rap" | 2014 | Non-album singles |
| "Kansas City Royals Insanity Rap" | 2015 | Non-album singles |
| "Supersonic" (with Brains McLoud and Big G) | 2016 | Dark Matter |
| "Turning into My Father" | 2018 | Non-album singles |
| "Lethal" (with Forever M.C. featuring ¡Mayday!) | 2018 | Non-album singles |
| "I Tried to Kill Myself" | 2018 | Non-album singles |
| "Rapping 1000 Words in 2 Minutes" | 2019 | Non-album singles |
| "Mac Lethal Sucks, Pt. 2" | 2019 | Non-album singles |

=== As featured artist ===
List of singles as a featured artist, showing year released and album name
| Title | Year | Album |
|---|---|---|
| "Our Kingdom" (The Aztext featuring Mac Lethal) | 2007 | The Sacred Document |
| "Skies The Limit" (The Muzik Lounge featuring Mac Lethal) | 2010 | Non-album singles |
| "You and Me Versus the World" (Nineteen Eighty Seven featuring Mac Lethal) | 2011 | Non-album singles |
| "Crustified Christmas" (R.A. the Rugged Man featuring Mac Lethal) | 2012 | Non-album singles |
| "Bender (Remix)" (Center Of Attention featuring Tech N9ne, Mac Lethal, Irv da Phenom, Jl of B.Hood, Joey Cool, Dutch Newman and Godemis) | 2013 | Non-album singles |
| "The Routine" (Ces Cru featuring Mac Lethal) | 2017 | Non-album singles |
| "Edgeycation" (Rcthahazard featuring Mac Lethal) | 2017 | Dead End |
| "YouTube Cypher, Vol. 2" (Crypt featuring Quadeca, Mac Lethal, ImDontai, Devvon Terrell, Ryan Oakes, Moxas, Scru Face Jean, VI Seconds, GAWNE, NemRaps, Lex Bratcher and DkRapArtist) | 2019 | Non-album single |
| "Death to Mumble Rap" (GAWNE featuring Mac Lethal, Futuristic and Crypt) | 2019 | Terminal |

== Guest appearances ==
List of non-single guest appearances, with other performing artists, showing year released and album name
| Title | Year | Other artist(s) | Album |
|---|---|---|---|
| "Ashes to Ashley" | 2008 | Sadistik | The Balancing Act |
| "Broken Van (Thinking of You)" | 2009 | CunninLynguists | Strange Journey Volume One |
| "Foot Loose" | 2010 | Noah23 | Heart of Rock |
| "Fuck Wells Fargo" | 2011 | Sole, B. Dolan | Nuclear Winter Volume 2: Death Panel |
| "Ammo" | 2011 | Orikal Uno | +1 (EP) |
| "The Giving Tree" | 2011 | MC Lars, K.Flay | Lars Attacks! |
| "I'm Awesome (Remix)" | 2011 | Spose | Happy Medium |
| "Sleep Is for the Weak" | 2011 | Eyenine | Afraid to Dream |
| "Random Love" | 2011 | Tone Spliff, Esoteric | Work Ethics |
| "White Democrats" | 2012 | Copywrite | God Save the King |
| "O'Doyle Rules" | 2012 | Apathy, Diabolic, Paradime, Joe Scudda, Rob Kelly, Ryu | It's the Bootleg, Muthafuckas! Volume 3 |
| "Nightcaps" | 2012 | Evil Intentions | Evil Intentions |
| "Get Off" | 2013 | Ces Cru | Constant Energy Struggles |
| "Slept On" | 2015 | Eigh8t The Chosen One, Copywrite | Hate On |
