= Catastrophic Event Specialists =

Studio album by Ces Cru
- Released: February 10, 2017
- Genre: Hip-hop
- Length: 57:34
- Label: Strange Music
- Producers: Anthony Cruz; DJ Rek; Kato; OhGoshLeotus; Seven; The Xtraordinair$; Josh Barber (co.)

Ces Cru chronology
Codename: Ego Stripper (2014)	Catastrophic Event Specialists (2017)

Singles from Catastrophic Event Specialists
- 1. "Gridlock" Released: December 9, 2016

Professional ratings
Review scores
Source	Rating
AllMusic	3/5 stars

Catastrophic Event Specialists is the sixth and final studio album by American hip-hop duo Ces Cru. It was released on February 10, 2017, via Strange Music, marking their third album for the label. Production was handled by Michael "Seven" Summers, The Xtraordinair$, Anthony Cruz, DJ Rek, Kato and OhGoshLeotus, with co-producer Josh Barber. It features guest appearances from Info Gates, J.L., Joey Cool, Krizz Kaliko, Mackenzie Nicole, Murs, Rittz and Tech N9ne. The album debuted at number 150 on the Billboard 200 and number 9 on the Independent Albums charts in the United States. Music videos were released for the songs "Average Joe" and "Slave".

== Track listing ==
No.	Title	Writer(s)	Producer(s)	Length
1.	"Calamity (Act I)"	Kyle Dykes; Dominique Sanders	The Xtraordinair$	1:40
2.	"Combustible"	Mike Viglione; Donnie King; Michael Summers	Seven	3:15
3.	"Highlander"	Viglione; King; Dykes; Sanders	The Xtraordinair$	3:16
4.	"Rubble" (featuring Rittz)	Viglione; King; Jonathan McCollum; Chris Ju	Kato	3:56
5.	"Tidal Wavy"	Viglione; King; Dykes; Sanders	The Xtraordinair$	2:42
6.	"Average Joe"	Viglione; Dykes; Sanders	The Xtraordinair$	2:40
7.	"Entropy (Act II)"	Dykes; Sanders	The Xtraordinair$	1:25
8.	"The Process (Guillotine)"	Viglione; King; Summers	Seven	3:14
9.	"Purge"	Viglione; King; Summers	Seven	4:40
10.	"Gridlock"	Viglione; King; Summers	Seven	4:05
11.	"Slave"	King; Leoren Davis	Oh Gosh Leotus	3:10
12.	"Rock Out" (featuring Tech N9NE)	Viglione; King; Aaron D. Yates; RaShann Chambliss; Josh Barber	DJ Rek; Josh Barber (co.)	3:10
13.	"Metal and Flesh" (featuring Murs)	Viglione; King; Nicholas Carter; Summers	Seven	3:25
14.	"Scourge (Act III)"	Dykes; Sanders	The Xtraordinair$	1:32
15.	"Deja Vu"	Viglione; King; Summers	Seven	3:46
16.	"Hero" (featuring Mackenzie Nicole)	Viglione; King; Mackenzie O'Guin; Anthony Cruz	Anthony Cruz	3:57
17.	"Hangout" (featuring Krizz Kaliko)	Viglione; King; Samuel Watson; Summers	Seven	4:06
18.	"Ghetto Celebrity" (featuring JL, Joey Cool and Info Gates)	Viglione; King; Jason Varnes; Taven Johnson; Justin Gillespie; Summers	Seven	3:35
Total length:				57:34

Bonus pre-order download track
No.	Title	Writer(s)	Producer(s)	Length
19.	"The Routine" (featuring Mac Lethal)	Viglione; King; David McCleary Sheldon; Lee Gresh	DJ Hoppa	3:36

iTunes bonus tracks
No.	Title	Writer(s)	Producer(s)	Length
19.	"Same Same"	Viglione; King; Summers	Seven	3:06
20.	"Famished (Remix)" (featuring PERSEPH1, Kutty Slitz, Trizz and JL)	Viglione; King; Ilea Ashley Henderson; Sterling W. Brown; Arthur Lea III; Varnes; Ju		4:58

== Personnel ==
- Mike S. "Ubiquitous" Viglione – vocals
- Donnie H. "Godemis" King – vocals
- Dave Weiner – additional vocals (track 3), A&R
- Jonathan "Rittz" McCollum – additional vocals (track 4)
- Anthony Devera – additional vocals (track 5)
- Stephen "Stevie Stone" Williams – additional vocals (track 6)
- Dominique Sanders – additional vocals (track 6), producer (tracks: 1, 3, 5–7, 14)
- Aaron Sutton – additional vocals (track 6)
- David "Mac Lethal" Sheldon – additional vocals (track 9)
- Michael Retana – additional vocals (track 9)
- James Cerven – additional vocals (track 9)
- Jeff Nelson – additional vocals (track 9)
- Josh Barber – additional vocals (track 9), bass guitar (track 1), co-producer (track 12), recording
- Carrine Spinks – additional vocals (track 9)
- Aaron "Tech N9NE" Yates – additional vocals (track 12)
- Nicholas "Murs" Carter – additional vocals (track 13)
- Mackenzie Nicole O'Guin – additional vocals (track 16)
- Samuel "Krizz Kaliko" Watson – additional vocals (track 17)
- Bre The 1st Lady – additional vocals (track 18)
- Jason "J.L." Varnes – additional vocals (track 18)
- Taven "Joey Cool" Johnson – additional vocals (track 18)
- Justin "Info Gates" Gillespie – additional vocals (track 18)
- Lee "DJ Hoppa" Gresh – scratches (track 4)
- Mark Lowrey – piano (tracks: 9, 10)
- Kyle "Lnrd D$troy" Dykes – producer (tracks: 1, 3, 5–7, 14)
- Michael "Seven" Summers – producer (tracks: 2, 8–10, 13, 15, 17, 18)
- Christopher "Kato" Ju – producer (track 4)
- Leoren "OhGoshLeotus" Davis – producer (track 11)
- RaShann "DJ Rek" Chambliss – producer (track 12)
- Anthony Cruz – producer (track 16)
- Ben "Bengineer" Cybulsky – mixing
- Tom Baker – mastering
- Travis O'Guin – executive producer, A&R

== Charts ==
Chart (2017)	Peak position
US Billboard 200	150
US Independent Albums (Billboard)	9
