= Jason Dean =

Jason Dean may refer to:

- Jason Dean (Charmed), a character from the television series Charmed
- character played by Christian Slater in the film Heathers
- alter ego of rapper Godemis of the rap duo Ces Cru
