= Gawne =

American rapper (born 1997)

GAWNE
- Born: Luke Gawne; March 12, 1997 (age 29); Oak Park, Illinois, U.S.
- Education: Oak Park and River Forest High School; University of Illinois Urbana-Champaign
- Genre: Hip hop
- Occupations: Rapper; singer; songwriter
- Years active: 2012-present
- Labels: Gawne LLC; Jeff Blue Music
- Website: lukegawne.com

Luke Gawne (born March 12, 1997), known mononymously as Gawne (stylized in all caps), is an American rapper, singer, and songwriter from Oak Park, Illinois. He is known for his fast, aggressive rapping style.

== Early life ==
Luke Gawne was born on March 12, 1997, in Oak Park, Illinois. Gawne originally wanted to pursue an interest in sports, but when he was fifteen he suffered a brain injury that put him out of high school for two and a half years. Gawne was in severe pain and had symptoms such as high sensitivity, vertigo, and migraines. To relieve the pain, he took medications such as Xanax but ended up getting overly reliant on them, struggling with addiction. In an attempt to turn away from it, Gawne started rapping. He was able to graduate from Oak Park and River Forest High School in 2014.

== Career ==
While he has been rapping since 2010, Gawne's popularity originally started rising in 2017. He had received a record deal when he was 18, but he found he could not escape from a bad contract that he had. Gawne's mother had to withdraw early from her 401(k) to help buy him out of the contract. In 2019, however, he was able to regain his momentum, releasing the single "Rise". He then started branching out and collaborating with other artists, such as Mac Lethal, Futuristic, Lil Xan, Jarren Benton, and Tech N9ne.

Gawne was covered by media in late 2023 when he co-signed with Shaquille O'Neal on his single "Chaos" and was also gifted a $1 million custom Rolls-Royce. In October 2023, Gawne received a message on Instagram from O'Neal, and was originally skeptical. They called on FaceTime, and Gawne flew to Los Angeles to meet O'Neal in person.

== Personal life ==
After finishing community college at Triton College, Gawne graduated from the University of Illinois Urbana-Champaign, majoring in Accounting and Marketing. He knew Emery Lehman, an Olympic speed skater, personally in middle school and made a tribute song to him with two other friends in 2014.

== Influences and style ==
Gawne has stated that his favorite band as a kid was System of a Down. This may have been an inspiration for his dynamic flow and style in his music.

== Discography ==
=== Studio albums ===
Title	Details
Gawne Lane	Released: January 25, 2015; Label: GAWNE LLC; Formats: Digital download, CD
Wings	Released: October 18, 2016; Label: GAWNE LLC; Formats: Digital download, CD
Gawne Mad	Released: May 22, 2018; Label: GAWNE LLC; Formats: Digital download, CD
Terminal	Released: January 24, 2020; Label: GAWNE LLC; Formats: Digital download, CD
Eternal	Released: November 9, 2020; Label: Gawne Records; Formats: Digital download, CD
Ghosts	Released: August 5, 2022; Label: GAWNE LLC; Formats: Digital download, CD
SEVEN	Released: March 3, 2023; Label: GAWNE LLC; Formats: Digital download, CD
Rainy Days	Released: September 27, 2024; Label: GAWNE LLC; Formats: Digital download, CD

=== Collaborative albums ===
Title	Details
Waves (with Atlus)	Released: April 1, 2022; Label: PsychTune Records; Formats: Digital download

=== Extended plays ===
Title	Details
Freedom	Released: May 22, 2018; Label: Jeff Blue Music; Formats: Digital download
Godspeed	Released: December 28, 2020; Label: GAWNE LLC; Formats: Digital download, CD

=== Singles ===
Title	Year	Album
"No Peace"	2018	Freedom
"Cardiac Arrest"	2018	Terminal
"High Voltage"	2019	Terminal
"Thanos"	2019	Terminal
"Homicide"	2019	Eternal
"Rise" (with CHVSE and Crypt)	2019	Terminal
"Rise - Solo Version"	2019	Terminal
"Once Upon a Time"	2019	Terminal
"End Game"	2019	Terminal
"Everybody Dies"	2019	Terminal
"No Sucka MC's"	2019	Terminal
"Nuclear"	2019	Terminal
"Flibbity Hibbity"	2019	Terminal
"Runaway" (with SEPPI)	2019	Terminal
"Death to Mumble Rap" (with Mac Lethal, Futuristic, and Crypt)	2019	Terminal
"Nightmare" (with Dansonn and SkyDxddy)	2020	Terminal
"No Going Back" (with CHVSE and Atlus)	2020	Eternal
"Hellbound" (with Olivia Thompson)	2020	Eternal
"Goodbye"	2020	Eternal
"Hello"	2020	Eternal
"World War 3" (with VI Seconds)	2020	Eternal
"Dead or Alive" (with Atlus)	2020	Eternal
"Death to Mumble Rap 2" (with Lil Xan)	2020	Eternal
"In My Bones" (with Rittz and Atlus)	2020	Eternal
"Kilos" (with Jarren Benton)	2020	Eternal
"Woah"	2020	Eternal
"Takeover"	2020	Eternal
"Michael Jordan" (with Futuristic)	2020	Eternal
"I Hate You"	2020	Eternal
"Mr. Incredible"	2020	Eternal
"Diablo" (with Vin Jay and Samad Savage)	2020	Eternal
"Lord of the Rings" (with 100 Kufis)	2020	Eternal
"Rick and Morty" (with Moxas)	2020	Eternal
"Dark Knight"	2020	Ghosts
"The Last of Us "	2020	Ghosts
"Bad Santa"	2020	Ghosts
"Scars"	2021	Ghosts
"Miami"	2021	Ghosts
"Die For You"	2021	Ghosts
"Bully"	2021	Ghosts
"Bad Dreams"	2021	Ghosts
"Till The End"	2021	Ghosts
"Lies"	2021	Ghosts
"This is War" (with Atlus and Tech N9ne)	2021	Waves
"Under Pressure" (with Atlus)	2021	Waves
"Sad" (with Atlus)	2022	Waves
"Hurt" (with Atlus)	2022	Waves
"Better Days" (with Atlus)	2022	Waves
"Criminal" (with Atlus)	2022	Waves
"Breaking My Back" (with Atlus)	2022	Waves
"Hollow"	2022	Ghosts
"Leave Me Alone" (with Liv)	2022	Ghosts
"Drowning"	2022	Ghosts
"Ghost Town"	2022	Ghosts
"Lost" (with Liv)	2022	Ghosts
"Alive"	2022	Seven
"War With Myself" (with Atlus)	2022	Seven
"Outlaw"	2022	Seven
"Invincible" (with Atlus)	2022	Seven
"RED" (with Tech N9ne)	2023	Seven
"Rescue Me"	2023	Seven
"F*** My Hometown"	2023	Rainy Days
"Back Down"	2023	Rainy Days
"Leaving"	2023	Rainy Days
"Toxic"	2023	Rainy Days
"Mayhem"	2023	Rainy Days
"Fuego"	2023	Rainy Days
"Rich Men North of Richmond - Remix"	2023	Non-album single
"Silence"	2023	Rainy Days
"Chaos" (with Shaquille O'Neal)		Rainy Days
"God Damn" (with Merkules & Vin Jay)	2024	Rainy Days
"Chopper"	2024	Rainy Days
"Apocalypse"	2024	Rainy Days
"Sinner"	2024	Rainy Days
"Lose Control"	2024	Rainy Days
"Kinfolk"	2024	Rainy Days
"Iron"	2024	Rainy Days
"MISSING YOU"	2024	Rainy Days
"My Oh My"	2024	Rainy Days
"Insane"	2024	Rainy Days
"Monster"	2024	Rainy Days
"Don't Wake Me Up" (with Atlus)	2024	Rainy Days
"Standing on My Business"	2024	Rainy Days
"Take Me Home" - GAWNE X Atlus	2024	
"misery loves company"	2025	
"Going Under"	2025	
The Greatest Eminem Remix Ever (Godzilla and More)	2025	
"Reflecions"	2025	
"Forgive Me"	2025	COLORS
GAWNE x Tommee Profitt "Nightmares"	2025	COLORS
"Somewhere With You"	2025	COLORS
"TITANIC"	2025	COLORS
"Geronimo"	2026	COLORS
"Overdose"	2026	
"Supernova"	2026	
"Darker Days"	2026	
"I'm Not Okay"	2026	
"OH MY GOD"	2026	
"King Kong"	2026	
"Work That"	2026	
"Ice Man"	2026	
"TV OFF"	2026	
"OK OK"	2026	
