= Constant Energy Struggles =

Studio album by Ces Cru
- Released: March 26, 2013
- Recorded: 2012–2013
- Studios: Various: Strangeland Studio (Kansas City, Missouri) Chapman Recording (Kansas City, Missouri)
- Genre: Hip hop
- Length: 1:00:05; 1:12:01 (Deluxe edition)
- Label: Strange Music
- Producers: Various: Travis O'Guin (exec.); Seven; Ben Cybulsky; Info Gates; Smartalec On The Track; Leonard Dstroy; Matt Peters; Bobby Pulliam

Ces Cru chronology
| 13 (2012) | Constant Energy Struggles (2013) | Codename: Ego Stripper (2014) |

Singles from Constant Energy Struggles
- 1. "Juice" Released: January 30, 2013; 2. "When Worlds Collide" Released: March 8, 2013

Constant Energy Struggles is the fourth studio album by American hip hop duo Ces Cru. The album was released on March 26, 2013, by Strange Music. The album features guest appearances from Tech N9ne, Liz Suwandi, JL B. Hood and Mac Lethal. The album debuted at number 98 on the Billboard 200 chart.

== Background ==
In an August 2012, interview with HipHopDX, Godemis spoke about the album saying: "We are in the very very early stages of making this [the LP]. We're just getting beat submissions and doing some writing. I've been writing like a madman. The title is going to be Constant Energy Struggle. Blaow! That's my first time saying that. The title is going to be Constant Energy Struggle and all that that implies. I think in that way, the album is going to be more well rounded. I think we're going to try to take the opportunity to open up a little bit, if you will, and let the fans know exactly how we feel and exactly what's been going on. I know that may not sound so cool sometimes, but we're also gonna talk about all the cool shit that's been happening to us. It's going to be a well rounded album in that way. There will be a lot more substance than there is on 13."

== Critical reception ==
Professional ratings
Review scores
| Source | Rating |
|---|---|
| AllMusic | 4/5 stars |
| HipHopDX | 3/5 stars |

Upon its release, Constant Energy Struggles was met with generally positive reviews. David Jeffries of AllMusic gave the album four out of five stars, saying "Tech N9ne's Strange Music label has some "true hip-hop" releases in its back catalog, for sure, but when Ces Cru puts down "We diversified the label/They called it 'Strange-hop'" within their first minute of their debut for the label, they're merely getting the issue out of the way. From then on, it's right to business, street business, that is, with a classic, Mobb Deep feel for the beats and the flow, topped with a Black Star-quality rhyme book." David "Rek" Lee of HipHopDX gave the album three out of five stars, saying "Fans might compare them to mainstream so-and-so who can't form proper sentences, but these are emcees who are striving for greatness and at times their rhymes just aren't there yet. They've graduated from the school of rhyming "lyrical-spiritual-miracle," but there are moments where it feels as if they're still having ciphers in the parking lot. It's a very solid first outing on a bigger stage."

== Commercial performance ==
The album debuted at number 98 on the Billboard 200 chart, with first-week sales of 5,400 copies in the United States.

== Track listing ==
| No. | Title | Writer(s) | Producer(s) | Length |
|---|---|---|---|---|
| 1. | "Lotus" | Mike Viglione; Donnie King; Michael Summers | Seven | 2:32 |
| 2. | "Juice" (featuring Tech N9ne) | Viglione; King; Aaron D. Yates; Summers | Seven | 3:31 |
| 3. | "When Worlds Collide" | Viglione; King; Summers | Seven | 4:15 |
| 4. | "Meditate" | Viglione; King; Summer | Seven | 4:37 |
| 5. | "Shake It Up" | Viglione; King; Summers | Seven | 4:25 |
| 6. | "Smoke" (featuring Liz Suwandi) | Viglione; King; Elizabeth Arnold; Summers | Seven | 3:47 |
| 7. | "Skip" | Viglione; Summers | Seven | 4:21 |
| 8. | "Prefade" (skit) | King | Ben Cybulsky | 0:55 |
| 9. | "Wavy" | King; Summers | Seven | 2:42 |
| 10. | "Radiate" | Viglione; King; Justin Gillespie | Info Gates | 3:52 |
| 11. | "Perception" | Viglione; King; Kyle Dykes | Leonard Dstroy | 4:32 |
| 12. | "Get That" (featuring JL B. Hood) | Viglione; King; Jason Varnes; Summers | Seven | 3:50 |
| 13. | "Confession" | Viglione; King; Dykes | Leonard Dstroy | 3:57 |
| 14. | "Seven Chakras" | Viglione; King; Matthew Peters; Robert Pulliam | Matt Peters; Bobby Pulliam | 4:00 |
| 15. | "Bread Break" (skit) | Viglione; King | Ben Cybulsky; Smartalec On The Track | 0:36 |
| 16. | "Fuck me on the Dough" | Viglione; King; Dykes | Leonard Dstroy | 4:01 |
| 17. | "Wall E" | Viglione; King; Gillespie | Info Gates | 4:30 |
| 18. | "Daydream" (featuring Liz Suwandi) | Viglione; King; Arnold; Dykes | Leonard Dstroy | 4:50 |
| Total length: | | | | 1:03:05 |

Deluxe edition bonus tracks
| No. | Title | Writer(s) | Producer(s) | Length |
|---|---|---|---|---|
| 19. | "Get Off" (featuring Mac Lethal) | writer | | 4:27 |
| 20. | "Witness" | Smartalec On The Track | | 2:55 |
| 21. | "Breathe" | | | 4:34 |
| Total length: | | | | 1:12:01 |

Strange Music pre-order digital bonus track
| No. | Title | Length |
|---|---|---|
| 22. | "Dough Re Mi" | 2:41 |

Notes

- Track listing and credits from album booklet.
- "Juice" features scratches by DJ Sku.
- "Prefade" features additional vocals by Young Prez.
- "Perception" features keyboards by Reggie B.
- "Confession" features keyboards by Joe Miquelon and bass guitar by Jimmy Dykes.
- "Bread Break" features additional vocals by Smartalec On The Track.
- "Wall E" features additional vocals by Seven, Christina Summers, Matt Peters, Bobby Pulliam and Carrine Spinks.
- "Daydream" features keyboards by Joe Miquelon and bass guitar by Jimmy Dykes.

Sample credits

- "Prefade" contains samples of "Klick, Clack, Bang" as performed by Ces Cru.
- "Bread Break" contains samples of "6 Minits" as performed by Godemis.

== Personnel ==
Credits for Constant Energy Struggles adapted from the album liner notes.

- Richie Abbott – publicity
- Tom Baker – mastering
- Aaron Bean – marketing & promotions, street marketing
- Brent Bradley – internet marketing
- Violet Brown – production assistant
- Valdora Case – production assistant
- Jared Coop – merchandising
- Glenda Cowan – production assistant
- Ben Cybulsky – mixing, producer
- DJ Sku – scratches
- Jimmy Dykes – bass guitar
- Penny Ervin – merchandising
- Braxton Flemming – merchandising
- Godemis – primary artist
- Ben Grossi – project consultant, general management
- Mary Harris – merchandising
- Info Gates – producer
- JL B. Hood – featured artist
- Leonard Dstroy – producer
- Robert Lieberman – legal
- Ryan Lindberg – internet marketing
- Liquid 9 – art direction & design
- Korey Lloyd – production assistant, project management
- James Meierotto – photography
- Joe Miquelon – keyboards
- Jeff Nelson – internet marketing
- Cory Nielsen – production assistant
- Dawn O'Guin – production assistant
- Travis O'Guin – executive producer, A&R
- Matt Peters – producer, additional vocals
- Bobby Pulliam – producer, additional vocals
- Jose Ramirez – street marketing
- Reggie B. – keyboards
- Victor Sandoval – internet marketing
- Brian Shafton – project consultant, general management
- Smartalec On The Track – additional vocals
- Carrine Spinks – additional vocals
- Christina Summers – additional vocals
- Michael "Seven" Summers – producer, additional vocals
- Liz Suwandi – featured artist
- Tech N9ne – featured artist
- Ubiquitous – primary artist
- Dave Weiner – A&R, associate producer
- Young Prez – additional vocals

== Charts ==
| Chart (2013) | Peak position |
|---|---|
| US Billboard 200 | 98 |
| US Top R&B/Hip-Hop Albums (Billboard) | 14 |
| US Independent Albums (Billboard) | 20 |
