= Dominion (Tech N9ne album) =

Studio album by Tech N9ne
- Released: April 7, 2017
- Recorded: 2016–17
- Genre: Hip-hop
- Length: 1:00:11
- Label: Strange Music
- Producer: Seven, Joshua S. Barber

Tech N9ne chronology
The Storm (2016)	Dominion (2017)	Strange Reign (2017)

Tech N9ne Collabos chronology
Strangeulation Vol. II (2015)	Dominion (2017)	Strange Reign (2017)

Dominion is the eighteenth studio album by American rapper Tech N9ne, the seventh in his "Collabos" series. The album was released on April 7, 2017, by Strange Music. It features the entire Strange Music roster and it was solely produced by the label's in-house producer Seven, with the exception of "Jesus and a Pill" being co-produced by Joshua S. Barber

== Track listing ==
- All tracks produced solely by Seven, except "Jesus and a Pill" was co-produced by Joshua S. Barber.

No.	Title	Length
1.	"Intro (Skit)"	0:40
2.	"Drama" (featuring Tech N9ne and Krizz Kaliko)	3:30
3.	"Casket Music" (featuring CES Cru, Tech N9ne, and Wrekonize)	3:47
4.	"Put Em On" (featuring Darrein Safron, Tech N9ne, and Stevie Stone)	3:36
5.	"Wheels Like Hill" (featuring Tech N9ne)	2:51
6.	"Nevermind Me" (featuring Stevie Stone, Tech N9ne, Krizz Kaliko, and Mackenzie Nicole)	3:53
7.	"Deevil Cookies (Skit)"	0:15
8.	"Some Good" (featuring JL B. Hood and Tech N9ne)	3:33
9.	"Reloaded" (featuring Darrein Safron, Tech N9ne, and Godemis)	3:28
10.	"The Answer" (featuring CES Cru, Tech N9ne, and Krizz Kaliko)	4:08
11.	"Fish in a Pita" (featuring Tech N9ne and Krizz Kaliko)	3:06
12.	"Mo' Ammo" (featuring Murs, Tech N9ne, and Rittz)	3:45
13.	"Stone Interviews (Skit)"	0:49
14.	"Lowdown" (featuring Darrein Safron, Tech N9ne, and Ubiquitous)	4:50
15.	"Morning 'Till the Nightfall" (featuring Rittz, Tech N9ne, Krizz Kaliko, and Wrekonize)	4:01
16.	"Take You Down" (featuring Mackenzie Nicole, Ryan Bradley, and Stevie Stone)	3:57
17.	"Interview 2 (Skit)"	0:49
18.	"Jesus and a Pill" (featuring Prozak, Tech N9ne, and Krizz Kaliko)	4:02
19.	"Angels in the Playground" (featuring Stevie Stone, Tech N9ne, and Krizz Kaliko)	4:34
20.	"Interview 3 (Skit)"	1:15
21.	"Cold Piece of Work (Preview)" (featuring JL B. Hood, Tech N9ne, and Krizz Kaliko)	0:30
Total length:		60:11

Deluxe edition
No.	Title	Length
1.	"Intro (Skit)"	0:40
2.	"Drama" (featuring Tech N9ne and Krizz Kaliko)	3:30
3.	"Casket Music" (featuring CES Cru, Tech N9ne, and Wrekonize)	3:47
4.	"Put Em On" (featuring Darrein Safron, Tech N9ne, and Stevie Stone)	3:36
5.	"Wheels Like Hill" (featuring Tech N9ne)	2:51
6.	"Nevermind Me" (featuring Stevie Stone, Tech N9ne, Krizz Kaliko, and Mackenzie Nicole)	3:53
7.	"Deevil Cookies (Skit)"	0:15
8.	"Some Good" (featuring JL B. Hood and Tech N9ne)	3:33
9.	"Reloaded" (featuring Darrein Safron, Tech N9ne and Godemis)	3:28
10.	"Bacon" (featuring Godemis, Brotha Lynch Hung, and Murs)	3:15
11.	"Shoe Game" (featuring Krizz Kaliko and Mackenzie Nicole)	3:07
12.	"The Answer" (featuring CES Cru, Tech N9ne, and Krizz Kaliko)	4:08
13.	"Salute" (featuring Murs, Tech N9ne, and ¡MAYDAY!)	3:46
14.	"Fish in a Pita" (featuring Tech N9ne and Krizz Kaliko)	3:06
15.	"Mo' Ammo" (featuring Murs, Tech N9ne, and Rittz)	3:45
16.	"Stone Interviews (Skit)"	0:49
17.	"Lowdown" (featuring Darrein Safron, Tech N9ne, and Ubiquitous)	4:50
18.	"Morning 'Till the Nightfall" (featuring Rittz, Tech N9ne, Krizz Kaliko, and Wrekonize)	4:01
19.	"Take You Down" (featuring Mackenzie Nicole, Ryan Bradley, and Stevie Stone)	3:57
20.	"Interview 2 (Skit)"	0:49
21.	"Jesus and a Pill" (featuring Prozak, Tech N9ne, and Krizz Kaliko)	4:02
22.	"Angels in the Playground" (featuring Stevie Stone, Tech N9ne, and Krizz Kaliko)	4:34
23.	"Interview 3 (Skit)"	1:15
24.	"Cold Piece of Work (Preview)" (featuring JL B. Hood, Tech N9ne, and Krizz Kaliko)	0:30
Total length:		71:29

Strange Music pre-order bonus track
No.	Title	Length
25.	"Love" (featuring Rittz and Tech N9ne)	3:29

== Charts ==
Chart (2017)	Peak position
New Zealand Heatseekers Albums (RMNZ)	10
US Billboard 200	28
US Top R&B/Hip-Hop Albums (Billboard)	16
