= Texts from Bennett =

Blog and book by Mac Lethal

Texts from Bennett is a blog created by Mac Lethal (born David McCleary Sheldon), purportedly based on text messages exchanged between Lethal and his "cousin" Bennett.

== Website ==
As Gawker reported in late 2011, "The Tumblr displays iPhone screenshots of text message conversations between the site's creator and Bennett, his 17-year-old cousin who 'thinks he's a Crip, works at Amoco, has a girlfriend named Mercedes, and is one of the most unintentionally funny and brilliant souls on the planet.'" While The Smoking Gun reported that Bennett was purely an invention, Lethal maintained the veracity of his creation, telling The Huffington Post, "[The Smoking Gun story] is absolutely 100 percent inaccurate."

== Book publication ==
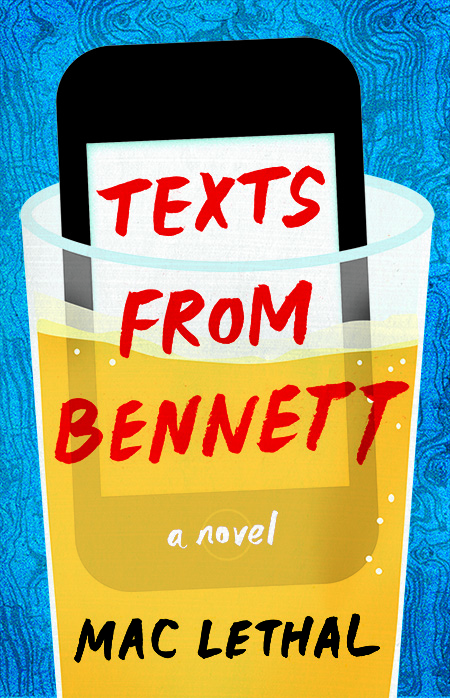
Cover of the trade paperback first edition of Texts from Bennett.

Texts from Bennett, the novel, was released on September 3, 2013. The book proposal was sold to Gallery Books, an imprint of Simon & Schuster, in May 2012, by Lethal's William Morris Endeavor agents.

The book is described as "[a] family story for the twenty-first century, based on the phenomenally popular Texts from Bennett Tumblr blog, this epistolary novel chronicles the year that Bennett and the rest of his freeloading family moved into his cousin Mac's household." According to the author, "the book is an ode to how I met my wife and it's a love story."

Texts from Bennett was a Library Journal "pick of the month" for "African American Fiction". Writing for the journal, Rollie Welch notes "The author’s portrayal of poverty, drug use, and the working poor white folks’ struggle to get by has serious street cred." According to Welch, although "lengthy sidebars drag down the story," "it's an interesting and impressive debut."

Booklist, a trade publication "from the trusted experts at the American Library Association", calls Lethal's book a "well-intended, albeit a little uneven, first novel... the heart of the novel is pure." Reviewer Mark Eleveld says, "This is a necessary novel that follows the phenomenon of poor white teens diving into black cultural stereotypes. The language is rough but true, and tough issues are addressed with care and understanding."

== TV show ==
On November 4, 2013, it was announced that FX had purchased the rights to produce a Texts From Bennett TV show.
