= Strange Reign =

Studio album by Tech N9ne
- Released: October 13, 2017
- Recorded: 2016–17
- Genre: Hip hop
- Length: 53:32
- Label: Strange Music
- Producer: Seven, Joshua S. Barber, Sainte, Frizz

Tech N9ne chronology
Dominion (2017)	Strange Reign (2017)	Planet (2018)

Tech N9ne Collabos chronology
Dominion (2017)	Strange Reign (2017)	COSM (2024)

Strange Reign is the nineteenth studio album by American rapper Tech N9ne, the eighth in his "Collabos" series. The album was released on October 13, 2017, by Strange Music. It features the entire Strange Music roster and it was solely produced by the label's in-house producer Seven, with the exception of "Dangerous" and "These Hands" being co-produced with Sainte and Joshua S. Barber respectively along with "'Brand New Hunnids" being produced by Frizz.

== Track listing ==
- All tracks produced solely by Seven, except "Brand New Hunnids" was produced by Frizz, while "Dangerous" was co-produced with Sainte, and "These Hands" was co-produced with Joshua S. Barber.

No.	Title	Length
1.	"Cold Piece of Work" (featuring JL B. Hood, Tech N9ne, Joey Cool, and Jay Trilogy)	4:36
2.	"Minimize" (featuring Stevie Stone, Tech N9ne, and Krizz Kaliko)	3:36
3.	"Brand New Hunnids" (featuring Tech N9ne, JL B. Hood, Rittz, and Jeff James)	4:22
4.	"Let Go" (featuring Big Scoob, Tech N9ne, and Darrein Safron)	3:33
5.	"Is You The Police?" (featuring JL B. Hood, Tech N9ne, Murs, and Ubiquitous)	4:08
6.	"Come Down" (featuring Stevie Stone, Tech N9ne, and Krizz Kaliko)	3:14
7.	"Let's Link" (featuring Tech N9ne and Big Scoob)	3:30
8.	"Price Is Going Up" (featuring ¡MAYDAY! and Tech N9ne)	4:56
9.	"Happen" (featuring Tech N9ne)	3:20
10.	"Whatever You Want" (featuring Mackenzie Nicole and Darrein Safron)	3:20
11.	"Dangerous" (featuring Above Waves and Tech N9ne)	3:26
12.	"Stick It In" (featuring Tech N9ne and Krizz Kaliko)	3:28
13.	"Plenty" (featuring CES Cru, Krizz Kaliko, and Stevie Stone)	3:23
14.	"These Hands" (featuring Prozak, Wrekonize, Tech N9ne, and Mackenzie Nicole)	4:07
15.	"Bad JuJu (Preview)" (featuring Tech N9ne and King Iso)	0:45
Total length:		53:32

Bonus disc
No.	Title	Length
1.	"Quicksand" (featuring Big Scoob, Godemis, and Stevie Stone)	3:03
2.	"Off My Square" (featuring ¡MAYDAY!, Tech N9ne, and Rittz)	4:39
3.	"Settle Down" (featuring Mackenzie Nicole and Wrekonize)	2:08
4.	"Lyin'" (featuring Darrein Safron and JL B. Hood)	2:40
5.	"Face Down" (featuring Krizz Kaliko)	3:32
Total length:		69:35

Strange Music pre-order bonus tracks
No.	Title	Length
1.	"Cold Piece of Work (Original Version)" (featuring JL B. Hood, Tech N9ne, and Krizz Kaliko)	3:10
2.	"We Burn" (featuring Krizz Kaliko, Darrein Safron, and Tech N9ne)	4:01
Total length:		76:46
