= Orikal Uno =

American rapper

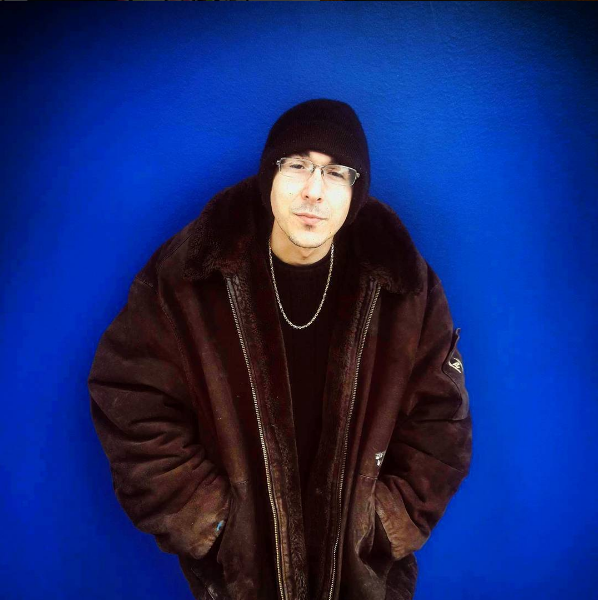
- Orikal Uno in Downtown St. Paul (2017)

Background information
- Born: Antonio Lorenzo Rosario; July 27, 1989 (age 37)
- Origin: Saint Paul, Minnesota, United States
- Genre: Hip hop
- Occupations: Rapper, DJ, FM Radio Host Visual Artist, Songwriter, Producer, Audio Engineer
- Years active: 2002–present
- Label: Graff Roots Media (Present)
- Website: Custom Graffiti; Webpage; Facebook page

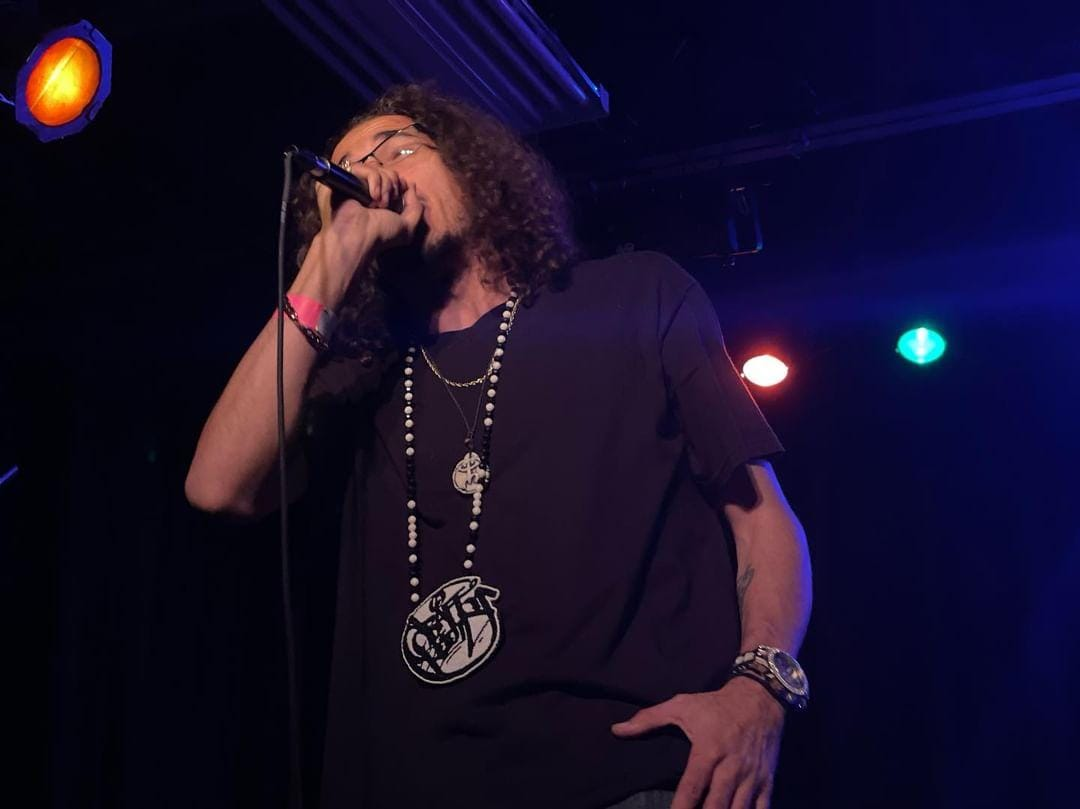
Orikal Uno performing live in Minneapolis, MN in 2023

Antonio Lorenzo Rosario (born July 27, 1989), better known as Orikal Uno, is an American rapper and mix DJ / host of "The Check In w/ Orikal Uno" radio show on 98.9 FM KRSM (Minneapolis) "featuring nothing but the best in Twin Cities Hip-Hop, Rap, R&B and Soul music" from Saint Paul, Minnesota. Orikal Uno is also known as a visual artist; painting and shipping custom canvases and skateboards for people via multiple platforms on the internet. He is also a notable music producer and audio engineer.

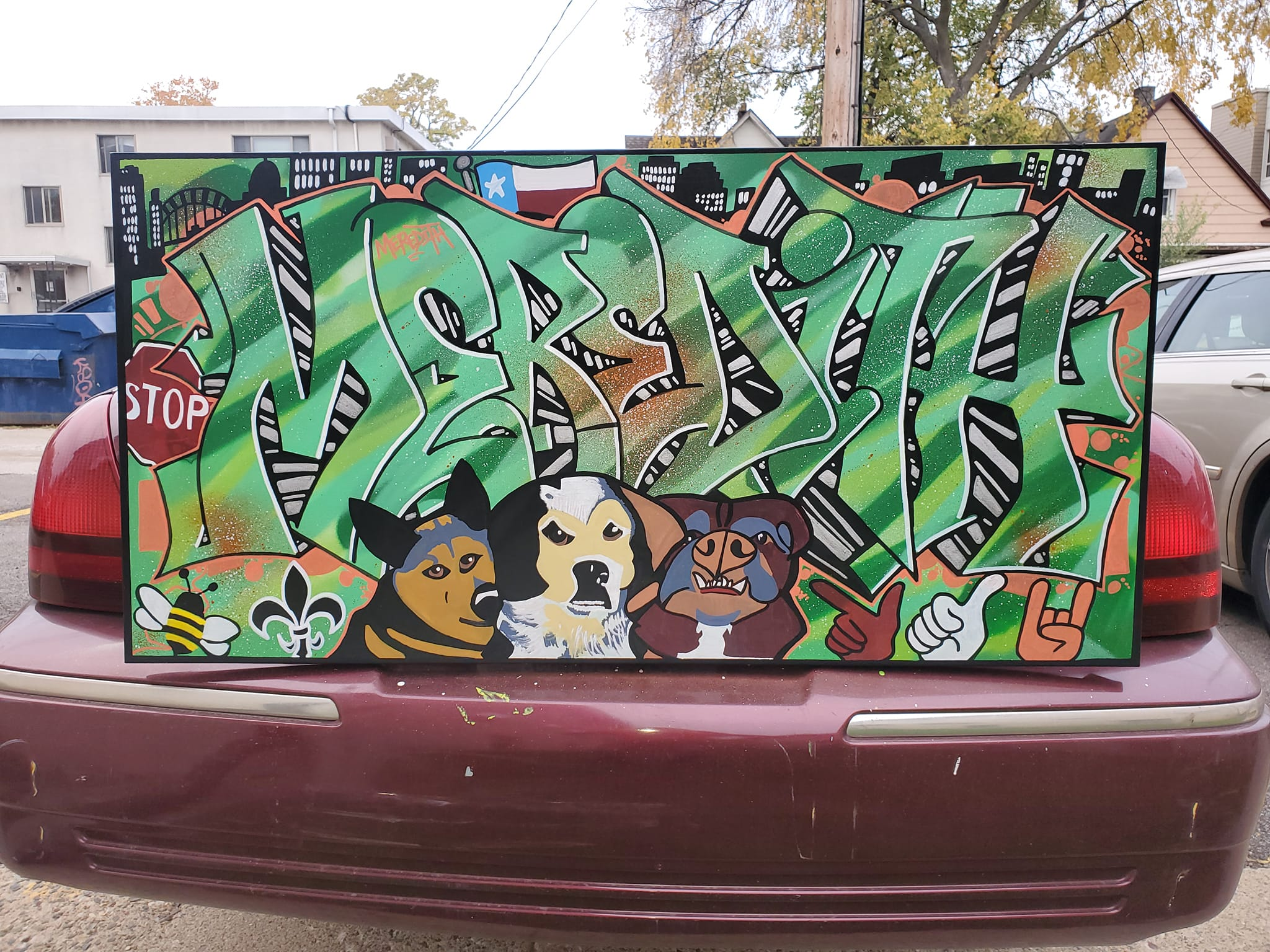
A 24" x 48" canvas painted with spray paint and acrylic by Orikal Uno

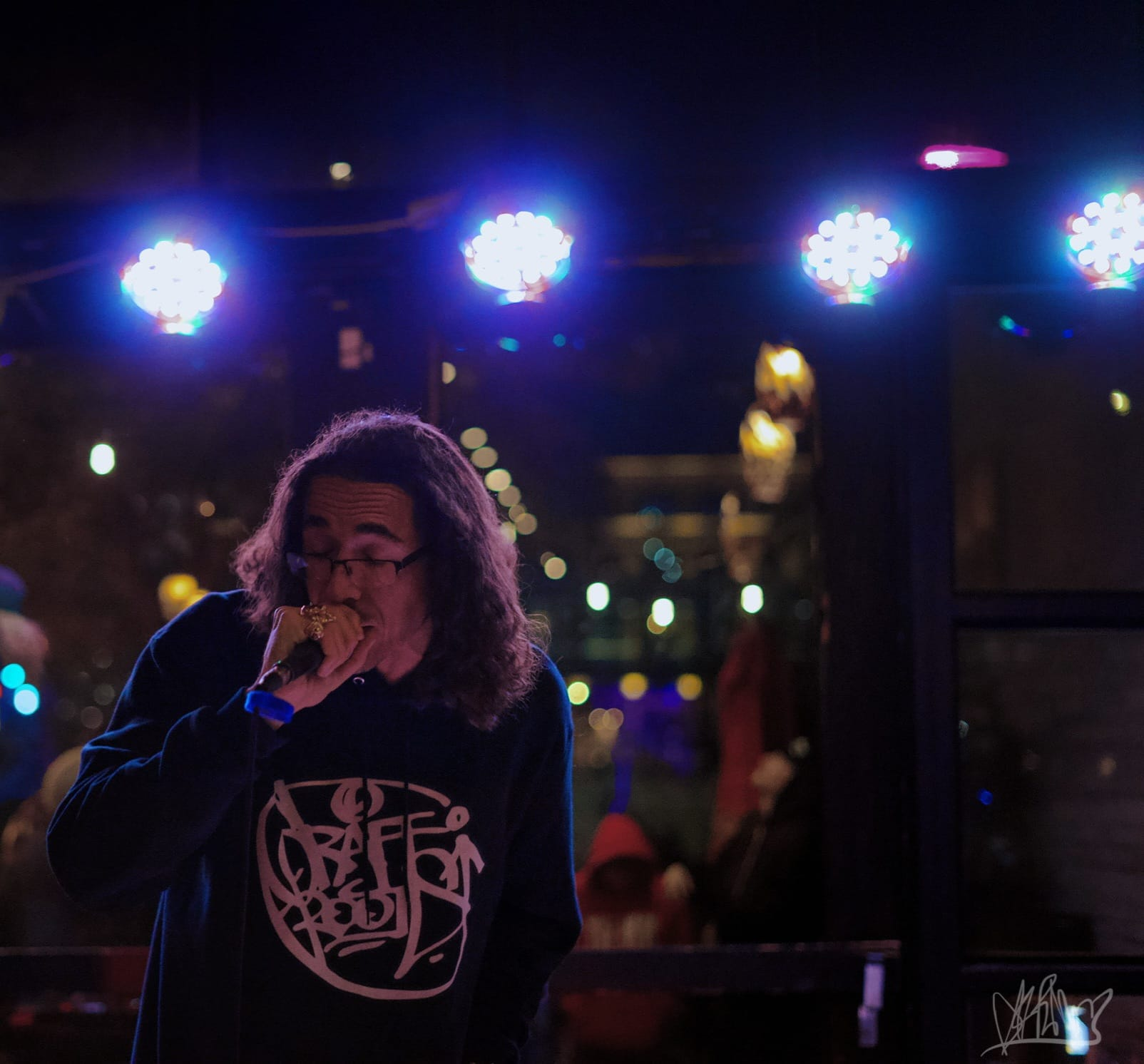
Orikal Uno performing live in Minneapolis, 2023

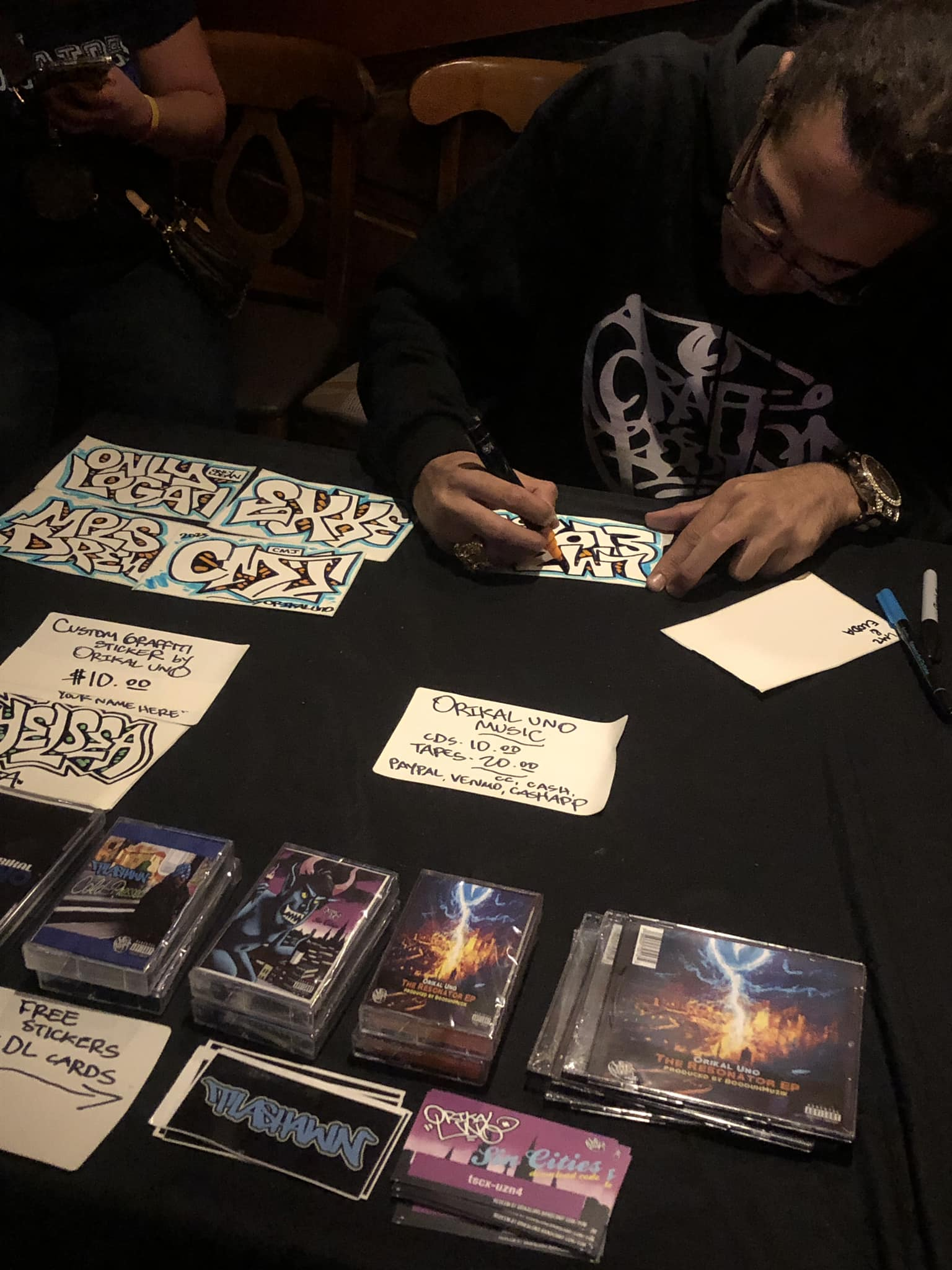
Orikal Uno doing custom graffiti stickers and selling his music at merchandise table in Minneapolis, 2023

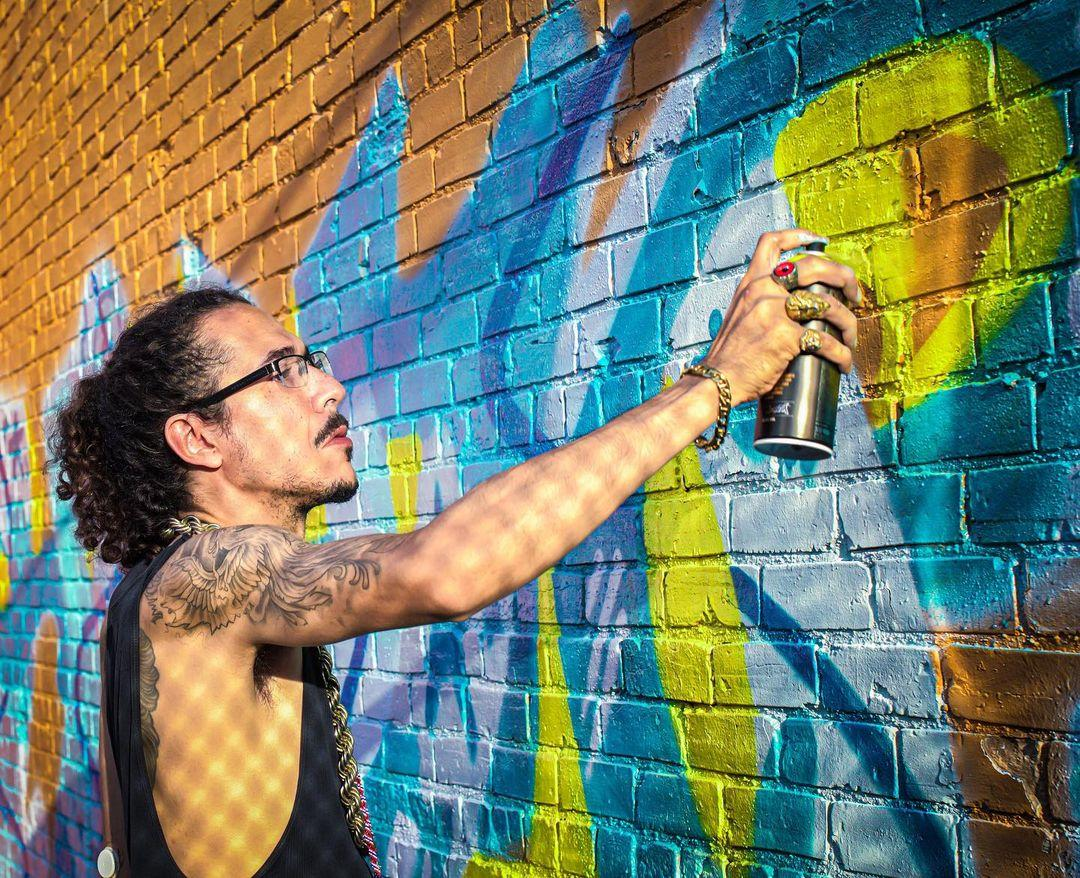
Orikal Uno painting a wall in Minneapolis in August 2023

== Early life and education ==
Orikal Uno was born Antonio Lorenzo Rosario in Saint Paul, Minnesota, on July 27, 1989. He is of Puerto Rican and European descent. He graduated from St. Paul Open School in 2006. He has had a noticeable vocal conversational stutter since his early childhood. Although it is less prominent, it is still noticeable in conversation. He has quoted hip-hop and freestyle rapping as a way to finally be able to "speak fluently and clearly" as he can rap at a rapid-fire pace without a single hiccup or stutter.

== Career ==
Before establishing himself as a musician, Rosario spent time studying the art and science of graffiti. Often the outcast among the local crews in the Twin Cities, he was forced to go out on his own and learn the ropes from the ground up. It was around this time that his love for hip-hop music led to Rosario starting to write rap songs with friends and on his own. Scraping up any sort of equipment he could, he had a makeshift recording setup that was responsible for two full-length releases (Under the name of Orikal), Unquestionable (2003) and Visions of Elevation (2004). These records were primarily produced by Hiphopapotamus, a producer he met on a Sage Francis internet forum.

Due to differences between the two, Hiphopapotamus and Orikal parted ways. Being left without beats, Orikal taught himself how to make instrumentals, starting out on Fruityloops and eventually landing on his current go-to program, Reason. He would go on to produce two more full-length albums: The Harsh Reality (2006) and Now What?! (2007) under the name Orikal.

Orikal founded Graff Roots Media in 2006 as a platform to release his own music and art, which has operated as his label. The goal of the organization is to be able to do everything music, art and marketing related in-house.

In 2008, Orikal decided to add "Uno" to his professional name. Partly as homage to his roots in graffiti, partly to reflect his Puerto Rican heritage, and partly to solidify a brand of his own without confusion. It was also this year that he was diagnosed with Type-1 Diabetes and has been insulin-dependent ever since. At the end of the year, he traveled out to Los Angeles where he worked for Ron Sobel at North Star Media. It was around this time that Orikal started working with musician Maria Isa. They recorded various music, and digitally released a compilation of unheard music "Then and Now" in 2011.

In 2011, Orikal successfully launched a Kickstarter campaign with a target of $1500 to release his first official album as Orikal Uno, titled "Uno" and produced by long-time friend and frequent collaborator Anonimust. Backers were rewarded with an autographed copy of the album as well as personalized stickers painted by Orikal.

In 2012, Sab the Artist and Abstract Rude released The Awful Truth via Rhymesayers Entertainment in which Orikal Uno produced the title song. Later that year, Orikal also released his full-length album "It Is What It Is" which was produced by frequent collaborator Chris Goodwin. This record also featured appearances by DisputeOne and Ganzobean.

Chris Goodwin and Orikal would then go on to release "Whatever Happens, Happens" in 2013. A darker album in comparison to "It Is What It Is," this album featured appearances by Twin Cities emcees Kristoff Krane and Freez (of Minneapolis rap group Illuminous 3).

In 2014, DisputeOne introduced Orikal to producer Serebe, the producer behind Eyedea's song Perfect Medicine. The duo linked up and released the full-length album "Sleepwalker", which features appearances by Glo Pesci, DisputeOne, Michelle Kearney, NL Emnt and DJ Elsewhere.

In 2015, Anonimust and Orikal teamed up again to release the full-length album "Chasing Paradise", which would go on to score Orikal his first publishing deal. Later that year Orikal and DisputeOne created their first full-length album and 12" vinyl record titled "OnePlusOne". The duo first started working with each other in late 2011, going on to release the mixtape "Homework Volume 1" and performing throughout the Twin Cities for the next year, including a sold-out show at the Fineline Music Cafe in which rapper Mac Lethal ordered the entire crowd pizza. In 2016, OnePlusOne, release of their debut record "1+1". This release is Orikal Uno's first appearance on 12" vinyl, which was self-released through his label Graff Roots Media. In 2016, Orikal Uno and DJ Greenery formed spellbound - a project which sees DJ Greenery on production and Orikal on vocals and song arrangement.

In 2017, Orikal released his LP "Tone Rosario". He also performed with DJ Greenery as spellbound at a sold out show held at the venue First Avenue's 7th St. Entry opening for hip-hop heavyweights Blackalicious in October 2017. That same year, Minneapolis—St. Paul arts publication City Pages named Orikal Uno's self-produced single "Knockin" as the lead video of the Top 5 music videos of Minnesota, and the OnePlusOne song "Pelican" produced by Orikal Uno gained radio play on KZGO.

In January 2018, Orikal Uno released Come Back, the third collaborative effort with DJ Dixon DeVille (f/k/a Jayechs, Anonimust) on production.

On December 7, 2020, Ice-T retweeted the Muja Messiah song "Covid" produced by Orikal Uno to his 1.9 million followers on Twitter.

In April 2023, Orikal debuted the radio show "The Check In w/ Orikal Uno" on 98.9 FM KRSM Radio in Minneapolis, Minnesota. The show contains a weekly recorded mix and blend of Twin Cities Hip-Hop, Rap, R&B and Soul music including other music from rising independent and mainstream artists across the globe.

== Discography ==
=== Orikal Uno ===
==== Studio albums ====
- Unquestionable (produced by Hiphopapotamus) (2003) (CD)
- Visions of Elevation (various producers) (2004) (CD)
- The Harsh Reality (produced by Orikal Uno) (2006) (CD)
- Now What?! (produced by Orikal Uno) (2007) (CD)
- Uno (produced by Jayechs) (2011) (CD)
- It Is What It Is (produced by Chris Goodwin) (2012) (Digital)
- Whatever Happens, Happens (produced by Chris Goodwin) (2013) (Digital)
- Sleepwalker (produced by Serebe) (2014) (Digital)
- Chasing Paradise (produced by Jayechs) (2015) (Digital)
- Tone Rosario (produced by Orikal Uno) (2017) (Digital)
- Come Back (produced by Jayechs) (2018) (Digital)
- Vibes Up (produced by Big Jess of the Unknown Prophets) (2020) (Digital)

==== EPs ====
- Then and Now (f/ Maria Isa) (2011) (Digital)
- Indigo EP (w/ AP Lit Class) (produced by Orikal Uno) (2018) (Digital)
- Tonaphide EP (produced by Bona Phide) (2018) (Digital)
- Speech Therapy EP (produced by Orikal Uno) (2019) (Digital)
- Vessel EP (produced by Buck KAC) (2021) (Digital)
- Love Luck EP (produced by Nicademus) (2021) (Digital)
- Sin Cities EP (produced by Jayechs) (2023) (Cassette; Digital)
- The Resonator EP (produced by Booduh Muzik) (2023) (Cassette; Digital)

==== Mixtapes ====
- Organized Grind Volume 1 (2009) (Digital)
- Organized Grind Volume 2 (blended by DJ Elsewhere) (2013) (Digital)
- Organized Grind Volume 3 (2018) (Digital)

=== spellbound (w/ DJ Greenery on production and cuts) ===
- Rich With Ambition (2016) (Digital)
- Holy Acrimony (2022) (Cassette; Digital)

=== OnePlusOne (Orikal Uno & DisputeOne (fka Extreme)) ===
- Homework Volume 1 (2012) (Digital)
- 1+1 (2016) (Vinyl, CD)

=== Songs / Albums Produced by Orikal Uno ===
- T'La Shawn - Cold Pressed EP (2023) (Cassette | Digital)
- Muja Messiah - Covid (2020) (Single | Digital)
- Muja Messiah - 38th and Floyd (2020) (Single | Digital)
- Vinny Crook$ - Just A Northside Kid (2020) (Digital)
- TruthMaze - The Holy Vible EP (2018) (Digital)
- Musab & Abstract Rude - The Awful Truth (2011)

== Personal life ==
Uno is currently located in South Minneapolis and is said to be inspired by watching over Lake Street.
