= 13 (Ces Cru EP) =

EP by Ces Cru
- Released: August 28, 2012
- Genre: Hip-hop
- Label: Strange Music
- Producers: Info Gates; Jason "Koko" Bridges; Seven; SmartAlec

Ces Cru chronology
13 (2012)	Recession Proof (2015)

13 is the first extended play by American hip-hop duo Ces Cru. It was released on August 28, 2012, via Strange Music. Produced by Info Gates, Seven, Jason "Koko" Bridges and SmartAlec, it features guest appearances from Info Gates, Krizz Kaliko and Tech N9NE. The EP debuted at number 156 on the Billboard 200, number 26 on the Top R&B/Hip-Hop Albums chart, number 18 on the Top Rap Albums chart, number 31 on the Independent Albums chart and number 6 on the Heatseekers Albums chart, with first-week sales of 2,900 copies in the United States.

== Track listing ==
No.	Title	Writer(s)	Producer(s)	Length
1.	"Tempus Fugit"	Mike Viglione; Donnie King; Justin Gillespie	Info Gates	1:44
2.	"Peter Parker"	Viglione; King; Gillespie	Info Gates	2:41
3.	"Klick Clack Bang"	Viglione; King; Gillespie	Info Gates	4:02
4.	"Colosseum"	Viglione; King; Michael Summers	Seven	4:14
5.	"One Bomb State" (featuring Info Gates)	Viglione; King; Gillespie	Info Gates	2:57
6.	"Livin' Life"	Viglione; King; Jayson Bridges	Jason "Koko" Bridges	3:40
7.	"Time Is Now"	Viglione; King; Alec Sartain	SmartAlec	3:36
8.	"It's Over" (featuring Tech N9NE and Krizz Kaliko)	Viglione; King; Aaron D. Yates; Samuel Watson; Summers	Seven	3:53

== Personnel ==
- Mike "Ubiquitous" Viglione – vocals
- Donnie "Godemis" King – vocals
- Justin "Info Gates" Gillespie – additional vocals (track 5), producer (tracks: 1–3, 5)
- Aaron "Tech N9NE" Yates – additional vocals (track 8)
- Samuel "Krizz Kaliko" Watson – additional vocals (track 8)
- Michael "Seven" Summers – producer (tracks: 4, 8)
- Jason "Koko" Bridges – producer (track 6)
- Alec Daniel "SmartAlec" Sartain – producer (track 7)
- Ben Cybulsky – mixing
- Neil Simpson – mastering
- Travis O'Guin – executive producer

== Charts ==
Chart (2012)	Peak position
US Billboard 200	156
US Top R&B/Hip-Hop Albums (Billboard)	26
US Top Rap Albums (Billboard)	18
US Independent Albums (Billboard)	31
US Heatseekers Albums (Billboard)	6
