= Next to Nothing (Rittz album) =

Studio album by Rittz
- Released: September 9, 2014
- Recorded: 2013–2014
- Genre: Hip-hop
- Length: 60:01
- Label: Strange Music
- Producer: Travis O’Guin (exec.); The Avengerz; Best Kept Secret; Corbin King; Five Points Music Group; Lifted; Kato; Matic Lee; Reklis Beatz; Track Bangas; T. Stoner; Seven; WLPWR

Rittz chronology
The Life and Times of Jonny Valiant' (2013)	Next to Nothing (2014)	Top of the Line (2016)

Next to Nothing is the second studio album by American rapper Rittz. The album was released on September 9, 2014, by Strange Music. The album features guest appearances from Twista, Yelawolf, Trae tha Truth, Mike Posner, B.o.B, Shawty Fatt, and Scar.

== Background ==
In a June 2014 interview with AllHipHop, Rittz spoke about the album, saying he would rap about his own life, and tried to maintain his own artistic style to please his fans and avoid compromising it for financial success.

== Critical response ==
Professional ratings
Review scores
Source	Rating
AllMusic	3.5/5 stars
HipHopDX	3.5/5 stars
XXL	4/5 (XL)

Next to Nothing received positive reviews from music critics. Jay Balfour of HipHopDX praised Rittz's flow and fast rapping, though took issue with some "déjà vu moments and first-time misses". Jeffrey Whaley of XXL praised many of the tracks as "standout" and characterized the album as having "replay value" and working "sonically from beginning to end."

== Commercial performance ==
The album debuted at number 14 on the Billboard 200, with first-week sales of 21,627 copies in the United States. It also debuted at number 3 on both Rap Albums and Top R&B/Hip-Hop Albums charts. The album has sold 62,000 copies in the United States as of April 2016.

== Track listing ==
No.	Title	Writer(s)	Producer(s)	Length
1.	"Intro"	Jonathan McCollum; Mikeal "Corbin" King	Corbin King	1:56
2.	"Explode"	McCollum; David Sweeten; Corey Moore; Walter Williams, Jr.; Richard Brown	Five Points Music Group	3:07
3.	"Turn Down"	McCollum; Stepan "Lifted" Taft; Ryan "Lifted" Vojtesak	Lifted	4:11
4.	"Crown Royal"	McCollum; Michael Summers	Seven	4:49
5.	"Laf"	McCollum; Jonah "Matic Lee" Appleby	Matic Lee	3:32
6.	"Bounce" (featuring Twista)	McCollum; Carl Terrell Mitchell; Taft; Vojtesak	Lifted	3:55
7.	"Living a Dream" (featuring Trae tha Truth)	McCollum; Frazier Thompson III; Summers	Seven	3:38
8.	"In My Zone" (featuring Mike Posner and B.o.B)	McCollum; Michael Posner; Bobby Ray Simmons, Jr.; Craig Balmoris; Julian Kenneth Nixon	Best Kept Secret	4:58
9.	"Call 911"	McCollum; Julio "The Avengerz" Espaillat; Kyle "The Avengerz" Denmead; Juan "The Avengerz" Botero	The Avengerz	3:23
10.	"Basket Case"	McCollum; Jordan "Reklis Beatz" Ertle	Reklis Beatz	4:39
11.	"Profit" (featuring Yelawolf and Shawty Fatt)	McCollum; Michael Wayne Atha; Jerrico "Shawty Fatt" Horton; William Washington	WLPWR	3:28
12.	"Going Through Hell" (featuring Mike Posner)	McCollum; Posner; Balmoris; Nixon	Best Kept Secret	4:00
13.	"Wish You Could"	McCollum; Summers	Seven	4:18
14.	"Blow"	McCollum; Christopher Ju	Kato	3:43
15.	"White Rapper"	McCollum; Jeffrey Smith	Track Bangas	3:38
16.	"Turning Up the Bottle"	McCollum; Thomas "T. Stoner" Toner	T. Stoner	4:02
Total length:				1:01:16

Deluxe edition (bonus tracks)
No.	Title	Writer(s)	Producer(s)	Length
17.	"Broke and Famous"	McCollum; M. Summers	Seven	3:46
18.	"Lonely" (featuring Scar)	McCollum; Terrence Smith		3:50

Strange Music Pre-Order Bonus Track
No.	Title	Length
19.	"Ride It Out"	3:58

== Personnel ==
Credits for Next to Nothing adapted from the album liner notes.

- Richie Abbott – publicity
- The Avengerz – producer
- B.o.B – featured artist
- Tom Baker – mastering
- Craig Balmoris – producer
- Brent Bradley – internet marketing
- Violet Brown – production assistant
- Freddie "Scender" Burman – associate producer, A&R, artist management
- Valdora Case – production assistant
- Chico – additional vocals
- Toli Collins – additional vocals
- Jared Coop – merchandising
- Glenda Cowan – production assistant
- Ben "Bengineer" Cybulsky – mixing
- DJ Chris Crisis – scratches
- DJ Tight Mike – engineering
- Penny Ervin – merchandising
- Five Points Music Group – producers
- Braxton Flemming – merchandising
- Candice Freeman – additional vocals
- Adam Geron – street marketing
- Ben Grossi – project consultant, general management
- Marry Harris – merchandising
- Matthew Hayes – mixing
- Chad Hess – photography
- Jeremy Jones – associate producer, A&R, artist management
- Kato – producer
- Corbin King – producer
- Robert Lieberman – legal
- Lifted – producer
- Korey Lloyd – production assistant, project management
- Matic Lee – producer
- L. David McCollum – guitar
- Jeff Nelson – internet marketing
- Cory Nielsen – production assistant
- Julian Nixon – producer
- Nvisible Design – art direction & design
- Dawn O'Guin – production assistant
- Travis O'Guin – executive producer, A&R
- Lucas Parker – guitar, bass guitar
- Mike Posner – featured artist
- Jose Ramirez – street marketing
- Mark Reifsteck – booking
- Reklis Beatz – producer
- Rittz – primary artist
- Victor Sandoval – internet marketing
- Scar – additional vocals
- Seven – producer
- Brian Shafton – project consultant, general management
- Shawty Fatt – primary artist
- T. Stoner – producer
- Tasha P – additional vocals
- Kaitlyn Topperwein – street marketing
- Trae tha Truth – featured artist
- Track Bangas – producers
- Twista – featured artist
- Josie Wahl – additional vocals
- Daniel Watson – engineering
- Dave Weiner – associate producer, A&R
- WLPWR – producer
- Yelawolf – featured artist

== Charts ==
=== Weekly charts ===
Chart (2014)	Peak position
US Billboard 200	14
US Top R&B/Hip-Hop Albums (Billboard)	3
US Top Rap Albums (Billboard)	3
US Independent Albums (Billboard)	5

=== Year-end charts ===
Chart (2014)	Position
US Top R&B/Hip-Hop Albums (Billboard)	84
