= Codename: Ego Stripper =

Studio album by Ces Cru
- Released: August 5, 2014
- Recorded: 2013–14
- Studio: Various: Strangeland Studios (Kansas City, Missouri); Grey Room Studios (Atlanta, Georgia); Make Believe Studio (Omaha, Nebraska); Ongaud Productions (Chicago, Illinois); The Cuban American Social Club (Miami, Florida)
- Genre: Hip-hop
- Length: 54:53; 65:08 (deluxe edition)
- Label: Strange Music
- Producer: Various: Travis O'Guin (exec.); Leonard Dstroy; Info Gates

Ces Cru chronology
Constant Energy Struggles (2013)	Codename: Ego Stripper (2014)	Recession Proof (2015)

Singles from Codename: Ego Stripper
- 1. "Sound Bite" Released: June 26, 2014; 2. "Power Play" Released: July 22, 2014; 3. "Jimmy Stewart" Released: July 30, 2014

Codename: Ego Stripper is the fifth studio album by American hip-hop duo Ces Cru. The album was released on August 5, 2014, by Strange Music. The album debuted at number 40 on the Billboard 200 chart.

== Critical reception ==
Professional ratings
Review scores
Source	Rating
AllMusic	4/5 stars
HipHopDX	3.5/5 stars

Upon its release, Codename: Ego Stripper was met with generally positive reviews. David Jeffries of AllMusic said, "Still a force to be reckoned with, Ces Cru's sophomore effort for Tech N9ne's Strange Music label retains the energy and intensity of their debut while walking the pimp walk with a more comfortable, sure strut." Kellan Miller of HipHopDX said, "Ces Cru is still a band with a witty-lyrics heavy approach, but overall Codename: Ego Stripper excels at putting the entire package together; a glaring problem with their last release. Ushering in a lengthy track list for an audience easily enticed by instagram, vines, (is-that-a-baby-smoking-a cigarette?) attention spans shows that Ces feel that they deserve their massive viral hype. On that note, "Hope" features the duo waxing poetic over a jazzy instrumental about exactly how far they envision their careers will soar. It is a fitting nightcap to an impressive release."

== Commercial performance ==
The album debuted at number 40 on the Billboard 200 chart, with first-week sales of 6,354 copies in the United States.

== Track listing ==
No.	Title	Writer(s)	Producer(s)	Length
1.	"Fate"	Mike Viglione; Donnie King; Michael Summers	Seven	2:56
2.	"Jimmy Stewart"	Viglione; King; Summers	Seven	3:27
3.	"Sound Bite"	Viglione; King; Kyle Dykes	Leonard Dstroy	3:32
4.	"Whips"	Viglione; King; Summers	Seven	2:39
5.	"Give It to Me"	Viglione; King; Summers	Seven	2:58
6.	"Pressure" (featuring Rittz)	Viglione; King; Summers; Jonathan McCollum	Seven	4:02
7.	"Double O.T."	Viglione; King; Summers	Seven	3:44
8.	"Power Play" (featuring Tech N9ne)	Viglione; King; Summers; Aaron D. Yates	Seven	3:30
9.	"Que Lastima" (featuring Angel Davanport)	Viglione; King; Ashley Hart; Summers	Seven	3:43
10.	"Blindfold" (featuring Wrekonize)	Viglione; King; Summers; Benjamin Miller	Seven	4:51
11.	"Phineas Gage"	Viglione; Summers	Seven	2:56
12.	"Strange Creature" (featuring Murs)	Viglione; King; Nicholas Carter; Summers	Seven	4:42
13.	"Every Weapon"	King; Justin Gillespie	Info Gates	2:29
14.	"Hope" (featuring Bernz)	Viglione; King; Bernardo Garcia; Summers	Seven	4:36
15.	"Axiom"	Viglione; King; Summers	Seven	4:49
Total length:				54:53

No.	Title	Writer(s)	Producer(s)	Length
16.	"Gutter Race"	writer		4:00
17.	"Catch Vibes"			3:02
18.	"Passenger"			2:55
Total length:				1:05:08

Strange Music pre-order digital bonus track
No.	Title	Length
19.	"Galaxy"	4:30

Notes

- Track listing and credits from album booklet.
- "Whips" features additional vocals by Seven and Kerry Rounds.
- "Pressure" features additional vocals by Crystal Clayton and guitar by Tyler Lyon.
- "Double OT" features additional vocals by Crystal Clayton.
- "Phineas Gage" and "Strange Creature" feature scratches by DJ Sku.
- "Hope" features bass guitar by Chris Handley.
- "Axiom" features additional vocals by Adrian Truth and piano by Mark Lowrey.

== Personnel ==
Credits for Codename: Ego Stripper adapted from the album liner notes.

- Richie Abbott – publicity
- Angel Davanport – featured artist
- Tom Baker – mastering
- Aaron Bean – marketing & promotions, street marketing
- Bernz – featured artist
- Brent Bradley – internet marketing
- Violet Brown – production assistant
- Valdora Case – production assistant
- Jared Coop – merchandising
- Glenda Cowan – production assistant
- Godemis – primary artist
- Ben Cybulsky – mixing, producer
- Penny Ervin – merchandising
- Braxton Flemming – merchandising
- Ben Grossi – project consultant, general management
- Mary Harris – merchandising
- Info Gates – producer
- Leonard Dstroy – producer
- Robert Lieberman – legal
- Ryan Lindberg – internet marketing
- Liquid 9 – art direction & design
- Korey Lloyd – production assistant, project management
- James Meierotto – photography
- Murs – featured artist
- Jeff Nelson – internet marketing
- Cory Nielsen – production assistant
- Dawn O'Guin – production assistant
- Travis O'Guin – executive producer, A&R
- Rob Prior – art direction & design
- Jose Ramirez – street marketing
- Mark Reifsteck – booking
- Rittz – featured artist
- Victor Sandoval – internet marketing
- Brian Shafton – project consultant, general management
- Michael "Seven" Summers – producer
- Tech N9ne – featured artist
- Ubiquitous – primary artist
- Dave Weiner – A&R, associate producer
- Wrekonize – featured artist

== Charts ==
Chart (2014)	Peak position
US Billboard 200	40
US Top R&B/Hip-Hop Albums (Billboard)	4
US Independent Albums (Billboard)	4
