= Put a Crown on It =

2019 studio album by Rittz

Studio album by Rittz
- Released: November 29, 2019
- Studio: Foz Rock (Duluth, Georgia)
- Genre: Hip hop
- Length: 43:31
- Label: CNT Records
- Producers: Freddie Burman (exec.); Audiogasm; Basement Beats; DMac the Producer; Drum Dummie; G Bliz; Pyro on da Beat; SoSpecial Beats; The Colleagues; Watson the Great

Rittz chronology
Last Call (2017)	Put a Crown on It (2019)	Picture Perfect (2020)

Professional ratings
Review scores
Source	Rating
RapReviews	7.5/10

Put a Crown on It is the fifth studio album by American rapper Rittz. It was released on November 29, 2019, through CNT Records with distribution via ONErpm, making it the rapper's first release on his own independent label since leaving Strange Music. Recording sessions took place at Foz Rock in Duluth, Georgia. It features guest appearances from Big Hud, Dizzy Wright, Futuristic, JellyRoll, Paul Wall, Too $hort, Twista and Yelawolf.

== Track listing ==
Adapted from Apple Music.

No.	Title	Writer(s)	Producer(s)	Length
1.	"Asian Fusion"	J. McCollum; D. McClelland	DMac The Producer	2:46
2.	"Feet Up" (featuring Paul Wall)	J. McCollum; R. James; P. Slayton	Drum Dummie	4:14
3.	"Sound Check" (featuring Jelly Roll)	J. McCollum; R. James; J. Richards; J. DeFord	Drum Dummie; Audiogasm	3:17
4.	"Politically Correct"	J. McCollum; G. Marcin; W. Jakub	Sospecial Beats	3:12
5.	"Toxic"	J. McCollum; A. Jidkov; J. Bridges	Basement Beats	3:17
6.	"Wake Up Call" (featuring Yelawolf and Twista)	J. McCollum; G. Marcin; W. Jakub; M. Atha; C. Mitchell	Sospecial Beats	4:03
7.	"On the Line"	J. McCollum; K. Powell; H. Johnson IV	The Colleagues	3:35
8.	"Paranoid and High" (featuring Dizzy Wright)	J. McCollum; K. Powell; G. Blizman; L. Wright	The Colleagues; G Bliz	4:11
9.	"Fake Smile"	J. McCollum; R. James	Drum Dummie	4:15
10.	"Twin Lakes"	J. McCollum; D. Oliver	Pyro On Da Beat	3:29
11.	"Name Tattoo" (featuring Big Hud and Too $hort)	J. McCollum; R. James; R. Hudson; T. Shaw	Drum Dummie	3:28
12.	"Live It Up" (featuring Futuristic)	J. McCollum; D. Watson; Z. Beck	Watson The Great	3:44
Total length:				43:31

== Personnel ==
- Jonathan McCollum – main artist
- Paul Slayton – featured artist (track 2)
- Jason DeFord – featured artist (track 3)
- Michael Wayne Atha – featured artist (track 6)
- Carl Terrell Mitchell – featured artist (track 6)
- La'Reonte Wright – featured artist (track 8)
- Ryan Hudson – featured artist (track 11)
- Todd Shaw – featured artist (track 11)
- Zachary Lewis Beck – featured artist (track 12)
- Candice Freeman – additional vocals (tracks: 3, 5)
- Stephen Freeman – keyboard (tracks: 2, 10)
- Corbin King – guitar (tracks: 3, 9)
- DJ Chris Crisis – cuts (tracks: 1, 2, 6, 9, 11)
- Dalton McClelland – producer (track 1)
- Roy "Drum Dummie" James – producer (tracks: 2, 3, 9, 11)
- Jeffery Richards – producer (track 3)
- Gerek Marcin – producer (tracks: 4, 6)
- Welka Bartosz Jakub – producer (tracks: 4, 6)
- Alexsei Jidkov – producer (track 5)
- Jayson Bridges – producer (track 5)
- Karl Powell – producer (tracks: 7, 8)
- Harrison Johnson IV – producer (track 7)
- Gabriel Blizman – producer (track 8)
- Da'Auhn Oliver – producer (track 10)
- Daniel Watson – producer (track 12), mixing, recording
- Freddie Burman – executive producer
- Irv Johnson – mastering
- Chris Allio – art direction & design
- Chad Hess – photography

== Charts ==
Chart (2019)	Peak position
US Independent Albums (Billboard)	6
US Top Album Sales (Billboard)	57

== See also ==
- 2019 in hip hop music
