= Last Call (Rittz album) =

Studio album by Rittz
- Released: September 29, 2017
- Recorded: 2016–2017
- Genre: Hip hop
- Length: 68:56
- Label: Strange Music
- Producer: Travis O'Guin (exec.); Seven; M. Stacks; The Avengerz; Marz Beats; Matic Lee; Peso Piddy; Mister K.A. Beats

Rittz chronology
Top of the Line (2016)	Last Call (2017)	Put a Crown on It (2019)

Singles from Last Call
- 1. "Indestructible" Released: August 17, 2017; 2. "Dork Rap" Released: September 13, 2017

Professional ratings
Review scores
Source	Rating
HipHopDX	3.9/5

Last Call is the fourth studio album by American rapper Rittz. The album was released on September 29, 2017, by Strange Music. In the album first week it sold 13,000 copies. It is also the final album under his contract with Strange Music.

== Singles ==
The album's first single "Indestructible" was released on August 17, 2017, followed by the album's second single, "Dork Rap", on September 13, 2017.

== Track listing ==
No.	Title	Writer(s)	Producer(s)	Length
1.	"Middle of Nowhere"	J. McCollum; M. Summers	Seven	3:49
2.	"Press Rewind"	J. McCollum; M. Summers	Seven	4:40
3.	"Indestructible"	J. McCollum; M. Summers	Seven	4:33
4.	"Down for Mine"	J. McCollum; M. Brown, Jr.	M. Stacks	4:12
5.	"Shootin Star"	J. McCollum; M. Summers	Seven	4:16
6.	"Dork Rap"	J. McCollum; P. Wadsworth; C. Fritzsimmons III; R. Hudson	Peso Piddy	4:21
7.	"Crash and Burn"	J. McCollum; M. Summers	Seven	4:36
8.	"Reality Check"	J. McCollum; M. Summers	Seven	3:56
9.	"Different Breed"	J. McCollum; J. Appleby	Jonah "Matic Lee" Appleby	4:31
10.	"Illumination"	J. McCollum; M. Summers	Seven	3:32
11.	"Into the Sky"	J. McCollum; M. Borngne, Jr.; R. Hudson	Marz Beats	3:30
12.	"Fuck Cancer" (featuring Candice Freeman)	J. McCollum; J. Botero; K. Denmead	The Avengerz	4:55
13.	"Lose My Cool"	J. McCollum; M. Summers	Seven	4:31
14.	"So Long"	J. McCollum; J. Botero; K. Denmead	The Avengerz	5:00
15.	"Victory Lap"	J. McCollum; M. Summers	Seven	3:41
16.	"I'm Only Human"	J. McCollum; M. Brown, Jr.	M. Stacks	4:59

Deluxe edition bonus tracks
No.	Title	Writer(s)	Producer(s)	Length
17.	"Live and You Learn"	J. McCollum; K. Richardson	Mister KA	4:02
18.	"Win" (featuring Hitman Shawty and Kane)	J. McCollum; G. Mapp; K. McGinty; M. Summers	Seven	4:59

Digital deluxe edition bonus tracks
No.	Title	Length
19.	"Good Life"	4:40
20.	"Side Note"	3:59
21.	"Spiraling Out of Control"	4:58

Strange Music pre-order bonus track
No.	Title	Length
22.	"Happy Ending"	4:09

== Charts ==
Chart (2017)	Peak position
US Billboard 200	43
US Independent Albums (Billboard)	3
US Top R&B/Hip-Hop Albums (Billboard)	25
