= The Life and Times of Jonny Valiant =

Studio album by Rittz
- Released: April 30, 2013
- Genre: Hip-hop
- Length: 59:38
- Label: Strange Music
- Producer: Travis O’Guin (exec.); Track Bangas; Coop Take Off on Em; Five Points Music Group; Snake and Bat Music; Matic Lee; Jonathan McCollum; Kasper Brightside; L. David McCollum; Mike Posner; Lester Mendez; M. Stacks; Lifted; Bunson & Beaker Beats

Rittz chronology
The Life and Times of Jonny Valiant (2013)	Next to Nothing (2014)

Singles from The Life and Times of Jonny Valiant
- 1. "Switch Lanes" Released: April 12, 2013

The Life and Times of Jonny Valiant is the debut studio album by American rapper Rittz. It was released on April 30, 2013, by Strange Music. The album has guest appearances by Big K.R.I.T., Mike Posner, Suga Free, Tech N9ne, Krizz Kaliko and Yelawolf.

== Background ==
In August 2012, Rittz signed to Tech N9ne's Strange Music record label. In November 2012, in an interview with HipHopDX, Rittz explained that he was 11 songs into his first album, saying, "With the 11 songs that I got already, the way I work is that I get the base set. If I can get the base set of the overall sound I’m looking for - the vibe of the album - then I can sprinkle in the other types of records. Story song, insert here. Girl song, insert here. But the music; the production; the beats actually set the tone. I think I’ve gotten that. So, as long as I’ve gotten that - I was a little worried at first because I wasn’t set on the beats. But now I got it. Now it’s just time to put in the spices and make it a complete thing."

== Singles ==
The first video for the album was released on March 28, 2013, for the song "For Real". The first single, "Switch Lanes" featuring Mike Posner, was released on April 12, 2013. On April 10, 2013, the music video was released for "Like I Am". On May 13, 2013, the music video was released for "Switch Lanes" featuring Mike Posner.

== Critical response ==
Professional ratings
Review scores
Source	Rating
DJBooth	4/5 stars
Exclaim!	5/10
HipHopDX	4/5 stars
XXL	(XL)

The Life and Times of Jonny Valiant was met with generally positive reviews from music critics. Edwin Ortiz of HipHopDX gave the album four out of five stars, saying, "While Rittz hasn’t yet reached his recording pinnacle, The Life And Times Of Jonny Valiant provides a thorough impression of his abilities as well as what he can strive for in the coming years. Going on nearly two decades since he first grasped the notion of becoming an emcee, it may have taken longer than expected, but Rittz is finally seeing the fruits of his labor flourish." David Jeffries of AllMusic gave the album a positive review, saying, "This debut effort should still satisfy those who follow Tech N9ne and the Strange Music roster, as stoner anthems, swaggering club music, and punch line-filled putdowns are the man's bread and butter." Dave William of XXL gave the album an XL, saying, "While these struggles might seem like a bit of a downer on paper, Rittz should win over listeners with the unmistakable honesty he raps with. He’s a highly affable “underdog,” one who can rap about his misfortunes with confidence, hope and determination."

Nathan S. of DJBooth gave the album four out of five stars, saying, "Hip-hop needs someone every outsider can relate to, someone who remains dedicated to being himself (and sounds damn good in the process). If Rittz can continue to do that, and Jonny Valiant suggests he can, he’ll attract more fans than any poser possibly could." Peter Marrack of Exclaim! gave the album five out of ten, saying, "One of the few uplifting moments on Rittz's new album occurs when he's shouting out his homies in Toronto — Droppin' Knowledge booked Rittz for a spot date in late 2011, which contributed to the Atlanta, GA rapper's early buzz. The rest of the album is morose, a diatribe against commercial rap bloated with personal confessions."

== Commercial performance ==
In its first week of release the album entered the Billboard 200 at number 25 and sold 14,000 copies in the United States. In its second week the album sold 3,200 copies. In its third week, the album sold 2,300 copies bringing its total sales to 19,000.

== Track listing ==
No.	Title	Writer(s)	Producer(s)	Length
1.	"Intro"	Jonathan McCollum; Michelle Nguyen; Jeffrey Smith	Track Bangas	2:07
2.	"My Interview"	McCollum; David Sweeten; Walter L. Williams Jr.; Richard Brown; Brandon Winslow	Five Points Music Group	4:17
3.	"Like I Am"	McCollum; Miguel Brown	M. Stacks	3:51
4.	"Fuck Swag"	McCollum; Stepan Taft	Lifted	2:54
5.	"Wastin Time" (featuring Big K.R.I.T.)	McCollum; Justin Scott; Dominique Tipton	Kasper Brightside	4:51
6.	"Goin In"	McCollum; Sweeten; Williams; R. Brown; Winslow	Five Points Music Group	4:25
7.	"Always Gon Be" (featuring Mike Posner)	McCollum; Matthew Cooper	Coop Take Off on Em	2:59
8.	"My Clothes (Interlude)"	McCollum	Snake and Bat Music	1:40
9.	"Amen"	McCollum; Sweeten; Williams; R. Brown; Winslow	Five Points Music Group	3:49
10.	"For Real"	McCollum; Taft	Lifted	3:31
11.	"Sober" (featuring Suga Free)	McCollum; Dejuan Walker; Jihad A. Hud II; Sweeten; Williams	Five Points Music Group	3:27
12.	"Say No More" (featuring Tech N9ne & Krizz Kaliko)	McCollum; Aaron Yates; Samuel Watson; Jonah Appleby	Matic Lee	5:00
13.	"Switch Lanes" (featuring Mike Posner)	McCollum; Lester Mendez; Mike Posner	Lester Mendez; Mike Posner	3:24
14.	"Misery Loves Company"	McCollum; Appleby	Matic Lee	4:18
15.	"Heaven" (featuring Yelawolf)	McCollum; Michael Atha; Sweeten; Williams; R. Brown; Winslow	Five Points Music Group	4:10
16.	"All Around the World"	McCollum	Jonathan McCollum; L. David McCollum	4:55
Total length:				59:38

Deluxe edition bonus tracks
No.	Title	Producer(s)	Length
17.	"Gravy"		3:55
18.	"Never Lettin' Go"		3:46
19.	"Drift Away"	Bunson & Beaker Beats	3:35
Total length:			1:10:54

Strange Music pre-order digital bonus track
No.	Title	Length
20.	"Same Shit, Different Day"	3:15

== Charts ==
Chart (2013)	Peak position
US Billboard 200	25
US Top R&B/Hip-Hop Albums (Billboard)	8
US Independent Albums (Billboard)	6
