= 11:11 (Mac Lethal album) =

Studio album by Mac Lethal
- Released: October 9, 2007
- Genre: Hip-hop
- Length: 51:14
- Label: Rhymesayers Entertainment
- Producers: Seven, Lazerbeak, Leonard Dstroy

Mac Lethal chronology
Men Are from Mars, Porn Stars Are from Earth (2002)	11:11 (2007)	Irish Goodbye (2011)

Singles from 11:11
- 1. "Make-Out Bandit / Pound That Beer" Released: 2007

Professional ratings
Review scores
Source	Rating
Robert Christgau	3.5/5 stars
City Pages	mixed
Exclaim!	favorable
HipHopDX	3.5/5 stars
Pitchfork	5.2/10
PopMatters	7/10 stars
SF Station	3/5
Spin	6/10
Stylus Magazine	A−
XLR8R	6/10

11:11 is the second studio album by American rapper Mac Lethal. It was released on Rhymesayers Entertainment on October 9, 2007.

== Critical reception ==
The album was described by AllMusic as "a clever, conversational rap record fueled by snarky humor and stoner cynicism." Meka Udoh of HipHopDX said, "Mac Lethal packs the album full of witty one-liners, self-deprecating humor and - as is the norm around the Rhymesayers clique - some socio-political commentary."

== Track listing ==
No.	Title	Producer(s)	Length
1.	"Backward"	Seven	3:04
2.	"Calm Down Baby"	Lazerbeak	3:49
3.	"Rotten Apple Pie"	Leonard Dstroy	3:43
4.	"Make-Out Bandit"	Seven	3:41
5.	"Pound That Beer"	Seven	3:31
6.	"Jihad!"	Seven	3:11
7.	"Crazy"	Seven	3:38
8.	"Know It All"	Leonard Dstroy	3:58
9.	"Sledgehammer"	Leonard Dstroy	3:41
10.	"Die Slow"	Leonard Dstroy	4:05
11.	"Lithium Lips"	Seven	3:32
12.	"Tell Me Goodbye"	Seven	3:48
13.	"Sun Storm"	Seven	3:28
14.	"11 Out of 10" (hidden track)	Leonard Dstroy	3:58
Total length:			51:14

== Personnel ==
Credits adapted from liner notes.

- Mac Lethal – vocals
- Seven – production (1, 4, 5, 6, 7, 11, 12, 13)
- Lazerbeak – production (2)
- Leonard Dstroy – production (3, 8, 9, 10, 14)
- John Brewer – keyboards (9, 14)
- DJ Sku – turntables
- Justin Mantooth – recording, mixing
- MK Larada – art direction, design, illustration, photography
- Jay Soldner – photography

== Charts ==
Chart	Peak position
US Top Heatseekers: West North Central (Billboard)	4
