= Top of the Line (Rittz album) =

Studio album by Rittz
- Released: May 6, 2016
- Recorded: 2015–2016
- Genre: Hip hop
- Length: 73:51
- Label: Strange Music; RBC
- Producer: Travis O’Guin (exec.); Seven; Kato; Best Kept Secret; Gabriel "Wonder" Arillo; Heartbeatz; Matic Lee; Mike Harnett

Rittz chronology
Next to Nothing (2014)	Top of the Line (2016)	Last Call (2017)

Singles from Top of the Line
- 1. "Ghost Story" Released: March 25, 2016; 2. "Propane" Released: April 1, 2016; 3. "Inside of the Groove" Released: April 18, 2016

Top of the Line is the third studio album by American rapper Rittz. The album was released on May 6, 2016, by Strange Music and RBC Records.

== Singles ==
On March 25, 2016, the album's first single "Ghost Story" was released. On April 1, 2016, the album's second single "Propane" featuring Devin the Dude and MJG was released. On April 18, 2016, the album's third single "Inside of the Groove" featuring E-40 and Mike Posner was released.

== Artwork ==
The cover art was created by Canadian artist Pencil Fingerz.

== Track listing ==
No.	Title	Producer(s)	Length
1.	"Top of the Line"	Seven	3:41
2.	"Ghost Story"	Kato	3:43
3.	"Until We Meet Again"	Seven	4:02
4.	"Pull Up"	Gabriel "Wonder" Arillo	3:02
5.	"Inside of the Groove" (featuring E-40 and Mike Posner)	Best Kept Secret	2:49
6.	"Bootleg Kev (Skit)"		0:37
7.	"The Formula" (featuring Tech N9ne and Krizz Kaliko)	Seven	4:49
8.	"MVP"	Seven	3:57
9.	"Kisa"	Seven	3:55
10.	"Propane" (featuring Devin the Dude and MJG)	Heartbeatz	4:40
11.	"My Window"	Seven	4:16
12.	"Diamonds and Gold" (featuring Cheeto Gambine)	Matic Lee	4:38
13.	"Back to Yesterday"	Kato	4:46
14.	"All Night"	Matic Lee	3:52
15.	"Lookin' Back Now"	Seven	3:03
16.	"Day of the Dead"	Matic Lee	3:55
17.	"Just Say No"	Heartbeatz	3:31
18.	"Ang3r Management (Skit)"		1:24
19.	"I’m No Good"	Seven	4:06
20.	"Nostalgia"	Heartbeatz	4:59
21.	"Strange Music Tag (Outro)"		0:06

Deluxe edition (bonus tracks)
No.	Title	Producer(s)	Length
22.	"Is That That Bitch"	Heartbeatz	3:41
23.	"Stars Align"	Mike Harnett	4:48
24.	"Same Old Me"	Seven	3:31
25.	"Cold Blooded"	Heartbeatz	4:34
26.	"Born for This"	Seven	3:47

Strange Music pre-order bonus track
No.	Title	Length
27.	"Stop Breathing" (featuring Stevie Stone and CES Cru)	4:25

== Charts ==
=== Weekly charts ===
Chart (2016)	Peak position
US Billboard 200	19
US Independent Albums (Billboard)	2
US Top R&B/Hip-Hop Albums (Billboard)	3

=== Year-end charts ===
Chart (2016)	Position
US Top R&B/Hip-Hop Albums (Billboard)	84
