= Ces Cru =

American hip hop group

CES Cru
- Origin: Kansas City, Missouri, USA
- Genres: Hip hop
- Years active: 2000–2021
- Label: Strange
- Past members: Ubiquitous; Godemis; Sorceress; Mad Dog 20/20; General Ali; Perseph One; Kutty Slitz

Ces Cru (often stylized as CES Cru) was an American hip-hop group from Kansas City, Missouri, signed to independent record label Strange Music. The duo composed of members Donnie "Godemis" King and Mike "Ubiquitous" Viglione, but has had numerous members throughout the years. Ces Cru released their debut album Capture Enemy Soldiers in 2004. They went on to release Cesphiles, Vol. 1 Codename:irongiant (2008) and The Playground (2009). In 2012, the duo signed to Tech N9ne's record label Strange Music and have released the EP 13 (2012) and Recession Proof (2015). Their first two studio albums on the label are Constant Energy Struggles (2013), and Codename: Ego Stripper (2014). The final release from Ces Cru is their sixth and final studio album Catastrophic Event Specialists, released in February 2017. In 2021, both artists have since departed from the label.

== Biography ==
Ces Cru originated in Kansas City with four members: Godemis, General Ali, Perseph One, and Sorceress. "Ces" originated as an acronym for "Conglomerate Elements of Self-consciousness", but the group came to use "Ces" as a backronym for a variety of other phrases throughout its existence. Around 2000, Godemis and Ubiquitous were introduced to each other, and Ubiquitous was brought into Ces Cru at Godemis' recommendation. In 2004, the group released its debut album, Capture Enemy Soldiers. Ces Cru's membership continued to fluctuate over the coming years; after Perseph One and Sorceress moved to Houston and General Ali was incarcerated, Godemis and Ubiquitous were its only remaining members, and they continued the group as a duo. The first Ces Cru release as a duo was the 2009 album The Playground.

Tech N9ne discovered Ces Cru when they were opening for Devin the Dude at a Kansas City show. Tech signed them to Strange Music in January 2012, and eight months later they released their Strange Music debut, the 13 EP on August 28, 2012. On March 26, 2013, the duo released their fourth album Constant Energy Struggles. The album debuted at number 98 on the Billboard 200. On August 5, 2014, they released their fifth album Codename: Ego Stripper, which debuted at number 40 on the Billboard 200.

== Discography ==
=== Studio albums ===
List of studio albums, with selected chart positions
Title	Album details	Peak chart positions		
Title	Album details	US	US R&B	US Rap
Capture Enemy Soldiers	Released: January 1, 2004 (US); Label: Commercial Entertainment Syndicate; Formats: CD, digital download	—	—	—
Cesphiles, Vol. 1 Codename:irongiant	Released: August 14, 2008 (US); Label: Commercial Entertainment Syndicate; Formats: CD, digital download	—	—	—
The Playground	Released: August 28, 2009 (US); Label: Commercial Entertainment Syndicate; Formats: CD, digital download	—	—	—
Constant Energy Struggles	Released: March 26, 2013 (US); Label: Strange Music; Formats: CD, digital download	98	14	9
Codename: Ego Stripper	Released: August 5, 2014 (US); Label: Strange Music; Formats: CD, digital download	40	4	2
Catastrophic Event Specialists	Released: February 10, 2017 (US); Label: Strange Music; Formats: CD, digital download	150	—	—

=== Extended plays ===
List of extended plays, with selected chart positions and certifications
Title	Album details	Peak chart positions		
Title	Album details	US	US R&B	US Rap
13	Released: August 28, 2012 (US); Label: Strange Music; Formats: CD, digital download	156	26	18
Recession Proof	Released: October 30, 2015; Label: Strange Music; Formats: CD, digital download	—	26	19

=== Guest appearances ===
List of non-single guest appearances, with other performing artists, showing year released and album name
Title	Year	Other artist(s)	Album
"Livin' Like I'm Dyin'"	2010	Tech N9ne, Kutt Calhoun, Krizz Kaliko	Bad Season
"Give It Up"	2011	Tech N9ne, Lebowski	All 6's and 7's
"Wiked Bizness"	2011	JL	Just Landed
"Unfair"	2011	Tech N9ne, Krizz Kaliko	Welcome to Strangeland
"Test You"	2012	Nesto The Owner	Career Killer 3
"Strange March"	2012	¡Mayday!, Brotha Lynch Hung	Thrift Store Halos EP
"Reckless"	2013	Krizz Kaliko	Son of Sam
"Colorado"	2013	Tech N9ne, B.o.B, Krizz Kaliko, ¡Mayday!, Rittz, Stevie Stone	Something Else
"Nobody Cares: (The Remix)"	2014	Tech N9ne, Wrekonize, Bernz, Stevie Stone, Krizz Kaliko	Strangeulation
"Great Night"	2014	Tech N9ne	Strangeulation
"American Horror Story"	2014	Tech N9ne	Strangeulation
"DIBKIS (Remix)"	2014	JL, Joey Cool, Info Gates	Brain Scatter 2
"Young Dumb Full of Fun"	2015	Tech N9ne, Mackenzie Nicole	Special Effects
"Fun-eral"	2015	Felt	Have a Nice Life
"Wait On It"	2015	Stevie Stone	Malta Bend
"One Wing"	2015	¡Mayday!	Future Vintage
"War Within"	2015	Prozak	Black Ink
"PBSA"	2015	Tech N9ne	Strangeulation Vol. II
"Strangeulation Vol. II Cypher II"	2015	Tech N9ne, Stevie Stone	Strangeulation Vol. II
"Orangutan"	2016	Krizz Kaliko, Tech N9ne, JL, Wrekonize, Rittz	GO
"Stop Breathing"	2016	Rittz, Stevie Stone	Top of the Line
"It Don't Go"	2016	Bernz	See You on the Other Side
"Out There"	2016	Joey Cool, JL, Tech N9ne	Swank Sinatra
"Casket Music"	2017	Tech N9ne, Wrekonize	Dominion
"The Answer"	2017	Tech N9ne, Krizz Kaliko	Dominion
"Plenty"	2017	Krizz Kaliko, Stevie Stone	Strange Reign
"One, Two"	2018	Joey Cool	Joey Cool
"Kcmo vs. Everybody"	2018	Info Gates, JL, Joey Cool, Bre the 1st Lady	Thankful

=== Music videos ===
Year	Title	Director	Artist(s)
As main performer
2012	"The Playground"		—N/a
2013	"Lotus"		—N/a
2013	"When Worlds Collide"		—N/a
2013	"Juice"		featuring Tech N9ne
2013	"Seven Chakras"		—N/a
2014	"Smoke"		featuring Liz Suwandi
2014	"Sound Bite"		—N/a
2014	"Wavy"		
2014	"Power Play"		featuring Tech N9ne
2014	"Jimmy Stewart"		—N/a
2014	"Double OT"	Marmo Films	—N/a
2015	"Letterman"		—N/a
2015	"Famished"		—N/a
2015	"Meditate"		—N/a
2016	"Ricochet"		
2017	"Average Joe"		
2017	"Slave"		
As featured performer
2015	"PBSA"		Tech N9ne featuring Ces Cru
2015	"Strangeulation Vol. II Cypher II"		Tech N9ne featuring Stevie Stone and Ces Cru
