= Mac Lethal =

American rapper (born 1981)

- Also known as: Uncle Mac
- Born: David McCleary Sheldon; July 25, 1981 (age 45); Kansas City, Missouri, U.S.
- Genre: Hip-hop
- Occupations: Rapper; producer; songwriter; radio host; author
- Instruments: Vocals; sampler; keyboards
- Years active: 2001–present
- Labels: HHI Recordings; Rhymesayers; Black Clover
- Website: maclethal.merchcentral.com

David McCleary Sheldon (born July 25, 1981), known professionally as Mac Lethal, is an American rapper, songwriter and author from Kansas City, Missouri. He is the founder of Black Clover Records and formerly a radio host on KRBZ 96.5 the Buzz show Black Clover Radio.

== Career ==
Lethal released his debut studio album, Men Are from Mars, Pornstars Are from Earth, on HHI Recordings in 2002. In that year, he won the Scribble Jam rap battle. Sage Francis took him on the Fuck Clear Channel Tour in 2004.

In 2006, Lethal founded Black Clover Records with longtime friend Jeremy Willis, who had been running the Datura Label. In 2007, he released a studio album, 11:11, on Rhymesayers Entertainment.

In 2011, Lethal was offered a contract from Sony which he rejected, referring to the $250,000, 5 album, 2 option and one milestone option deal as "insane". On November 30, 2011, Lethal posted a video on YouTube of him rapping over the beat to Chris Brown's "Look at Me Now" while he prepares a dish of pancakes in his kitchen. The video became a viral hit and got millions of views in a matter of days, leading to interviews on websites like CNN and The Washington Post. It was included on Spin's "10 Most Contagiously Viral Musical Web Sensations of 2011" list. In that year, he also released a studio album, Irish Goodbye, on Black Clover Records.

Lethal also runs a Tumblr feed called "Texts from Bennett", in which he posts text message conversations between himself and his cousin Bennett. Although some have questioned whether or not Bennett is a real person, he insists that the conversations are genuine. He released the novel of the same name on Simon & Schuster in 2013.

In April 2014, Lethal's song "Alphabet Insanity" was featured on The Ellen DeGeneres Show, then the following month on March 24 he appeared as a guest on the show and performed a fast rap that he made for DeGeneres.

Lethal and Amber Diamond host the television show, Binge Thinking, which premiered on MTV2 on April 1, 2016. On September 13, 2016, he released a studio album, Congratulations, which featured a guest appearance from Tech N9ne.

Before the Kansas City Chiefs' victory in the Super Bowl LIV, Lethal released a song titled "Kansas Chiefs Anthem 2020". In the song he references multiple Chiefs players from that season. In June 2021, Lethal released the album Winter Heartbreak II which was inspired be hardships he had recently faced.

== Personal life ==
Lethal was raised in Kansas City, Missouri. He has two children and practices Jiu Jitsu.

Shortly before the COVID-19 Lockdowns, Lethal experienced a series of hardships including the deaths of multiple loved ones, and a near divorce with his wife. When speaking on how the pandemic lockdown further affected him lethal said, "Then the country shutdown, which in a lot of ways was like zooming in on all the pain I was experiencing." The hardships he experienced would later inspire him to make the album Winter Heartbreak II.

== Discography ==
- Men Are from Mars, Pornstars Are from Earth (2002)
- 11:11 (2007)
- Irish Goodbye (2011)
- Congratulations (2016)
- Winter Heartbreak II (2021)

== Books ==
- Texts from Bennett: A Novel (2013) ISBN 978-1-4767-0687-0
