= Rittz =

American rapper from Georgia

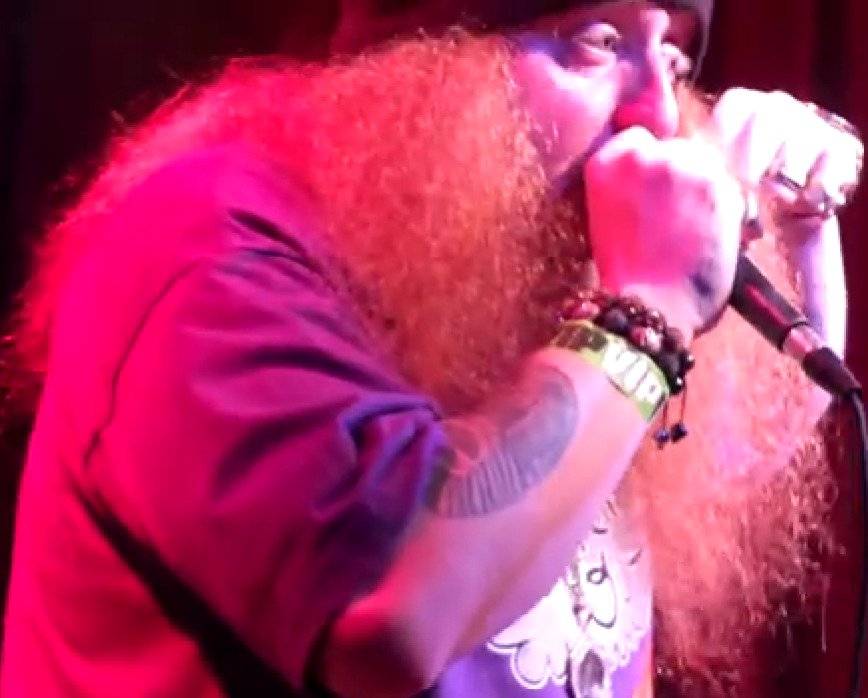
- Rittz in 2013

Background information
- Also known as: Rittz the Rapper
- Born: Jonathan Matthew McCollum; August 16, 1980 (age 46); Waynesburg, Pennsylvania, U.S.
- Origin: Gwinnett County, Georgia, U.S.
- Genres: Hip hop
- Occupations: Rapper; songwriter
- Years active: 2007–present
- Labels: CNT Records (current); Slumerican; Strange Music (former)
- Website: www.rittzmusic.com

Jonathan Matthew McCollum (born August 16, 1980), better known by his stage name Rittz, is an American rapper. His debut album The Life and Times of Jonny Valiant was released on April 30, 2013, rising to number 8 on Billboard's Hot R&B/Hip-Hop Songs chart. His next two albums, Next to Nothing (2014) and Top of the Line (2016) peaked at number 3 on the same chart. His fourth album, Last Call (2017), hit number 43 on the Billboard 200. All of these were released under Tech N9ne's Strange Music label.

Rittz fulfilled his four-album contract with Strange, then formed his own record label, CNT Entertainment, through which he released Put a Crown on It in 2019. The album reflects Rittz's battle to free himself from drug and alcohol addiction. The album hit number 6 on Billboard's Independent Albums chart.

== Career ==
=== 1980–2009: Early life and career ===
Rittz was born in Waynesburg, Pennsylvania, on August 16, 1980, and moved with his family to the suburbs of Gwinnett County, Georgia, when he was eight years old. His parents were intensely interested in rock and roll, ensuring that he and his siblings were exposed to musical instruments and recording studios from a young age.

Around 2003, after numerous disappointments, Rittz's musical career stalled. "I won Battlegrounds on Hot 107.9, got retired and shit and felt like I was 'bout to make it. But, so many industry up and downs, with managers, contracts…" He was broke, feeling dejected, living with friends, and ready to resign from the rap game. However, in 2009 he was contacted by the rapper Yelawolf, and this led to financial support. "I had some money behind me." Rittz says, "Everything was going good and then everything fell out, at the same time, I'm getting older, thinking it's time to hang it up. This isn't gonna happen and that's when Yelawolf put me on 'Box Chevy'." Rittz stated in a 2013 interview that he had supported himself by working various "nine to five" jobs, such as in the restaurant industry. Rittz also went on to say that he would commonly tell people he was a rapper, even when he was not active.

=== 2010–13: White Jesus and The Life and Times of Jonny Valiant ===
Rittz's career breakthrough occurred with the release of Yelawolf's 2010 EP track "Box Chevy". Since then, he has frequently collaborated with Yelawolf, and the pair toured together on the 2012 Slumerican Tour. Rittz is also widely known for his 2011 mixtape White Jesus. In 2012 he took his favorite songs from White Jesus and added a few new songs and re-released it as White Jesus: Revival.

Rittz signed to Tech N9ne's Strange Music in 2012. Rittz and Tech N9ne immediately began working together, releasing the popular collaboration remix of Rittz's "Bloody Murdah" shortly after Rittz joined the label. He released his solo debut, The Life and Times of Jonny Valiant on April 30, 2013. On October 15, 2013, Rittz appeared with fellow rappers Wax, Rapsody, Emis Killa and Jon Connor in the first cypher at the 2013 BET Hip Hop Awards.

=== 2014–2017: Next to Nothing, Top of the Line and Last Call ===
In April 2014, Rittz announced via Facebook that he would release his next album Next To Nothing on September 9, 2014. In an August 2015 interview with NEHipHop, Rittz announced that he would be releasing an album in May 2016, titled Top of the Line. In July 2017, Rittz announced that his next album would be titled Last Call and would be released on September 29, 2017.

Following the release of Last Call, Rittz had fulfilled his contractual obligations to Strange Music and decided not to renew his contract, amicably parting ways with the label. He founded his own label, CNT Entertainment.

== Personal life ==
Rittz previously spoke about his experiences and struggles on becoming a rapper as well his personal problems with alcoholism and substance abuse.

=== Health ===
On November 25, 2024, Rittz revealed in a now deleted post on Instagram showing him intubated in a hospital bed, stating that he was in the hospital under intensive care on November 19 for an undisclosed medical condition. He later recovered and discharged from the hospital on November 28. On April 8, 2025, Rittz disclosed he has cirrhosis and was suffering from acute kidney failure and anemia. On June 5, 2025, he later explained in a video that his hospital admission in 2024 was in relation to excessive alcohol consumption, which caused him to vomit blood and faint at his home. He later stated he nearly died from multiple organ failure as a result of blood vessels bursting from his other organs and lost about 6 pints (2.83 L) of blood, caused by his severely enlarged and swollen liver. Rittz later said he was first diagnosed with cirrhosis on his hospital visit and also disclosed he suffered from acute kidney failure, anemia due to the blood loss, acute respiratory failure with hypoxia and revealed he has type 2 diabetes. He earlier stated his liver and kidney functions were improving, but will refrain from alcohol throughout his life.

== Discography ==
Studio albums

- The Life and Times of Jonny Valiant (2013)
- Next to Nothing (2014)
- Top of the Line (2016)
- Last Call (2017)
- Put a Crown on It (2019)
- Picture Perfect (2020)
- Rittzmas (2020)
- MellowLOvation Music (2023)
