= Dizzy Wright discography =

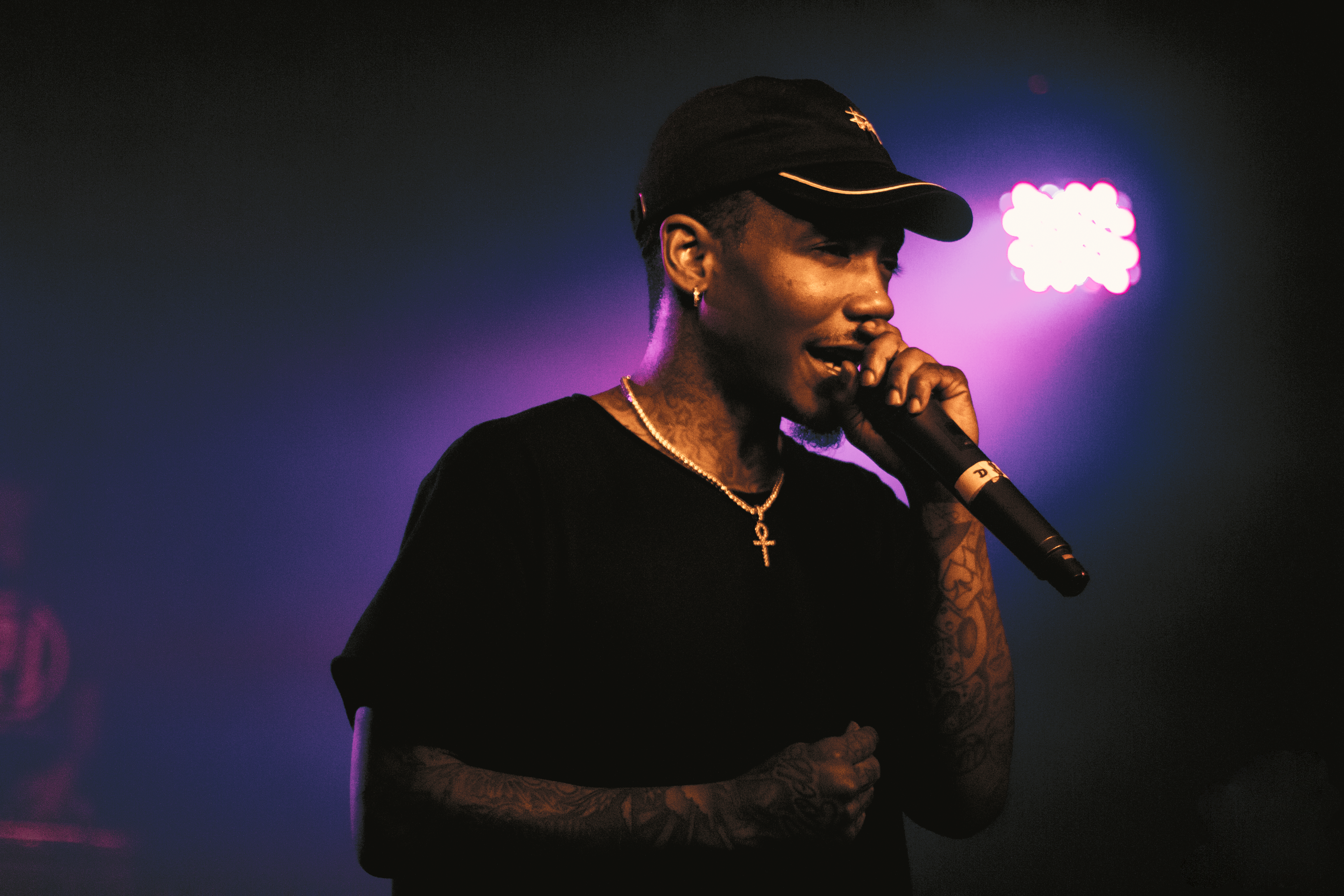
- Dizzy Wright performing in February 2018
- Studio albums: 6
- EPs: 6
- Singles: 99
- Collaborative albums: 1
- Mixtapes: 10

The discography of American rapper and songwriter Dizzy Wright consists of six studio albums, one collaboration album, 10 mixtapes, six extended plays and 99 singles (including 52 singles as a featured artist).

== Albums ==
=== Studio albums ===
List of studio albums, with selected chart positions and details
Title	Album details	Peak chart positions				Sales
Title	Album details	US	US Heat	US R&B/HH	US Rap	Sales
SmokeOut Conversations	Released: April 20, 2012; Label: Funk Volume; Format: CD, digital download	—	8	42	—	14,000
The Growing Process	Released: May 26, 2015; Label: Funk Volume, Warner Bros; Format: CD, digital download	47	—	5	5	
The Golden Age 2	Released: August 11, 2017; Label: Still Movin; Format: CD, digital download	—	—	—	—	
State of Mind 2	Released: November 24, 2017; Label: Still Movin; Format: CD, digital download	—	—	—	—	
Nobody Cares, Work Harder	Released: March 15, 2019; Label: Still Movin; Formats: CD, digital download	—	—	—	—	
My Hustle Unmatched	Released: September 18, 2020; Label: Dizzy Wright; Formats: CD, digital download, streaming	—	—	—	—	
"—" denotes a title that did not chart, or was not released in that territory.

=== Collaborative albums ===
List of collaborative studio albums, with selected details
Title	Album details
One Week Notice (as part of One Week Notice)	Released: January 5, 2018; Label: Still Movin; Formats: digital download
Dizzyland (with DJ Hoppa)	Released: April 15, 2022; Label: Still Movin; Formats: digital download

=== Mixtapes ===
List of mixtapes, with selected chart positions and details
Title	Album details	Peak chart positions		
Title	Album details	US Heat	US R&B/HH	US Rap
Tha Takeover (as Dizzy D Flash)	Released: March 21, 2010; Format: Free download	—	—	—
What Hip-Hop Needs (as Dizzy D Flash)	Released: June 1, 2010; Format: Free download	—	—	—
Legendary (as Dizzy D Flash)	Released: January 1, 2011; Format: Free download	—	—	—
Soul Searchin'	Released: May 21, 2011; Format: Free download	—	—	—
Soul Searchin' (The Next Level)	Released: September 5, 2011; Format: Free download; Label: Bluestar Records	—	—	—
Free SmokeOut Conversations	Released: June 12, 2012; Format: Digital download; Label: Funk Volume	—	—	—
The Golden Age	Released: August 19, 2013; Format: Digital download; Label: Funk Volume	15	39	23
Lost In Reality (with Mark Battles)	Released: February 17, 2015; Format: Digital download; Label: Fly America	—	—	—
Blaze With Us (with Demrick)	Released: November 2, 2016; Format: Digital download; Label: Self-released	—	—	—
G.I. Stoner	Released: October 30, 2018; Format: Digital download; Label: Self-released	—	—	—
Blaze With Us 2 (with Demrick)	Released: June 12, 2020; Format: Digital download; Label: The Smokers Club	—	—	—
"—" denotes a title that did not chart, or was not released in that territory.

== Extended plays ==
List of extended plays, with selected chart positions and details
Title	Album details	Peak chart positions			
Title	Album details	US	US Heat	US R&B/HH	US Rap
The First Agreement	Released: December 3, 2012; Label: Funk Volume; Format: Digital download	—	14	41	25
State of Mind	Released: April 15, 2014; Label: Funk Volume; Format: Digital download	54	—	11	5
Brilliant Youth (with Bishop Nehru)	Released: June 4, 2014; Format: Digital download; Label: Lifted Research Group	—	—	—	—
Wisdom and Good Vibes	Released: February 5, 2016; Label: Independent; Format: Digital download	—	—	24	14
The 702 EP	Released: July 2, 2016; Label: Still Movin; Format: Digital download	—	—	19	11
Don’t Tell Me It Can’t Be Done	Released: June 1, 2018; Label: Still Movin; Format: Digital download	—	—	—	—
G.I Stoner II: Rollin' Snake Eyez	Released: November 7, 2018; Label: Still Movin; Format: Digital download	—	—	—	—
Slidin' and Glidin'	Released: September 10, 2021; Label: Still Movin; Format: Digital download	—	—	—	—
"—" denotes a title that did not chart, or was not released in that territory.

== Singles ==
=== As lead artist ===
List of singles as lead artist, showing year released and album name
Title	Year	Album
"Solo Dolo"	2012	SmokeOut Conversations
"Can't Trust 'Em"	2012	SmokeOut Conversations
"Fly High" (featuring Nikkiya)	2012	The First Agreement
"Funk Volume 2013" (with Hopsin, Jarren Benton, DJ Hoppa and SwizZz)	2013	Non-album single
"Maintain" (featuring Joey Badass)	2013	The Golden Age
"Still Movin'"	2013	The Golden Age
"Killem With Kindness" (featuring AF Supreme)	2013	The Golden Age
"Raw Cypher" (with Like, Sir Michael Rocks and Mod Sun)	2014	Non-album single
"Everywhere I Go"	2014	State of Mind
"Spark up the Flame"	2014	Non-album single
"Conscious" (with Mark Battles)	2014	Lost In Reality
"I Need Answers" (featuring Nikkiya)	2014	Non-album single
"Train Your Mind"	2015	The Growing Process
"Floyd Money Mayweather"	2015	The Growing Process
"I Can Tell You Needed It" (featuring Berner)	2015	The Growing Process
"Free Meal" (with Hopsin and Jarren Benton)	2015	Non-album singles
"City Love"	2015	Non-album singles
"Plotting"	2016	Wisdom and Good Vibes
"Work a Lil Harder"	2016	Wisdom and Good Vibes
"They Know Why"	2016	Non-album singles
"The Way We Live" (featuring Audio Push)	2016	Non-album singles
"420 Vibe" (featuring Lil Debbie)	2016	Non-album singles
"On the Way" (featuring Demrick and Reezy)	2017	Non-album singles
"Wanna Remind You"	2017	State of Mind 2
"FFL"	2017	The Golden Age 2
"Word on the Streetz"	2017	The Golden Age 2
"Ghetto N.I.G.G.A"	2017	The Golden Age 2
"Job"	2017	The Golden Age 2
"The Intermission" (featuring Euroz, Demrick and Reezy)	2017	Non-album single
"Outrageous" (featuring Big K.R.I.T.)	2017	The Golden Age 2
"Flint to Vegas"	2017	Non-album single
"Hit Em with the Pose" (featuring Jazz Lazr)	2018	Don't Tell Me It Can't Be Done
"Vibe" (featuring Kid Ink)	2018	Don't Tell Me It Can't Be Done
"Problems and Blessings"	2018	Nobody Cares Work Harder
"Picture Perfect" (featuring Eric Bellinger)	2019	Nobody Cares Work Harder
"Champagne Service"	2019	Nobody Cares Work Harder
"Flight to Mexico" (with Renizance and The Stoners Circle)	2019	King Reni Falcone
"Hush" (with Corey Ellis)	2019	Non-album singles
"Keep Up" (featuring Enchanting)	2019	Non-album singles
"Heavy Handed"	2019	Non-album singles
"The Ride"	2019	Non-album singles
"Poppin Out"	2020	Non-album singles
"All Night" (with Demrick)	2020	Blaze With Us 2
"We Ain't the Same" (with Demrick)	2020	Blaze With Us 2
"Don't Worry" (with Demrick)	2020	Blaze With Us 2
"Police Can't See Me Alive"	2020	Non-album singles
"Disobey" (with Jarren Benton)	2020	Non-album singles

=== As featured artist ===
List of singles as a featured artist, showing year released and album name
Title	Year	Album
"Dedication" (Fe Raw featuring Dizzy Wright)	2012	Non-album single
"Don't Mind If I Do" (Futuristic featuring Dizzy Wright and Jarren Benton)	2012	Chasing Down a Dream
"Make'em Say" (B.Wash featuring Dizzy Wright)	2012	Non-album singles
"Major Big Faces" (Classick featuring Dizzy Wright)	2013	Non-album singles
"Red Cups" (Scru Face Jean featuring Dizzy Wright and Pedro)	2013	W.I.N.G.S (We Invent the Next Generations Sound)
"Ya'll Don't Do It Like This" (Nate Millyunz featuring Dizzy Wright)	2013	Non-album singles
"Appreci-Hated" (The Lifted Gifted featuring Dizzy Wright)	2013	Non-album singles
"Rite Nah" (Trademark Da Skydiver featuring Dizzy Wright)	2013	Flamingo Barnes 2: Mingo Royale
"Time Collapse" (Mann featuring Dizzy Wright)	2013	The Grey Area
"Love & Hip Hop" (Mark Battles featuring Joe Budden and Dizzy Wright)	2014	Black Einstein
"I Guess I'll Smoke" (Futuristic featuring Dizzy Wright and Layzie Bone)	2014	Traveling Local
"Rich So Bad" (Cristiles featuring Dizzy Wright and Dre' B)	2014	Non-album singles
"Vices" (Saheer featuring Dizzy Wright)	2014	Non-album singles
"Feelings" (C. Starks featuring J-Rob the Chief and Dizzy Wright)	2014	Non-album singles
"Hip Hop Shit" (Jon Dubb featuring DJ Hoppa and Dizzy Wright)	2014	The Leilana May Project
"Same Road" (Drae Smith featuring Dizzy Wright)	2014	Non-album singles
"Smokin' Love" (Remix) (Stick Figure featuring Collie Buddz, Dizzy Wright, Iration and J Boog)	2015	Non-album singles
"Fort Collins" (Hopsin featuring Dizzy Wright)	2015	Pound Syndrome
"Good Knight" (Kirk Knight featuring Joey Badass, Flatbush Zombies and Dizzy Wright)	2015	Non-album singles
"Fireproof" (J-Why featuring Dizzy Wright)	2016	Non-album singles
"Quarter Pound" (Jahni Denver featuring Dizzy Wright and Demrick)	2016	Different Breed
"Consequences" (Dshy featuring Dizzy Wright and Tru Def)	2016	Non-album singles
"Own Swag" (Crucial Lewis featuring Dizzy Wright)	2016	Non-album singles
"Suite Sixteen Episode I" (Still Movin featuring Dizzy Wright, Reezy, Demrick and Euroz)	2017	Non-album singles
"Suite Sixteen Episode II" (Still Movin featuring Dizzy Wright, Reezy, Demrick and Euroz)	2017	Non-album singles
"Contact High" (Demrick featuring Dizzy Wright and Paul Wall)	2017	Non-album singles
"Feel Alive" (TrakkSounds featuring T2 the Ghetto Hippie and Dizzy Wright)	2017	The Other Side
"The Message" (Telic featuring Dizzy Wright)	2017	Non-album single
"Keep Smoking" (Guns-N-Butter featuring Kalipso and Dizzy Wright)	2017	Guns n Butter
"Future Tense" (Reezy featuring Dizzy Wright)	2017	Non-album singles
"Let It Burn" (Demrick featuring Dizzy Wright and Euroz)	2017	Non-album singles
"A Toast to the Hustlers" (1k Watts featuring Dizzy Wright)	2017	Non-album singles
"Energy" (Rich Rocka featuring Dizzy Wright)	2017	Non-album singles
"Global" (2Realist featuring Dizzy Wright)	2017	Non-album singles
"Married to the Money" (K. Young featuring Hitmaka and Dizzy Wright)	2018	Married to the Money
"Coastin" (Drewz Andrews featuring Dizzy Wright)	2018	Non-album singles
"Flex on You" (Grafx featuring Dizzy Wright)	2018	Non-album singles
"Patience" (Demrick featuring Dizzy Wright)	2018	Non-album singles
"Energy" (Tuesday Knight featuring Dizzy Wright)	2018	Fresh Out the Rapper
"My Own Zone" (Tech N9ne featuring Futuristic and Dizzy Wright)	2018	Non-album single
"Neva Switched" (Reezy featuring Euroz and Dizzy Wright)	2019	Mitchell & Finesse 3
"High Grade" (Chris Webby featuring Dizzy Wright and Alandon)	2019	Wednesday After Next
"Shallow" (Marlon Craft featuring Dizzy Wright)	2019	Funhouse Mirror
"Know the Code" (Hvshi featuring Dizzy Wright and YaboyRoyalT)	2019	Non-album singles
"Came Up" (Astrus featuring Dizzy Wright)	2019	Non-album singles
"Tell Me How You Want It" (King Vvibe featuring Dizzy Wright)	2019	Non-album singles
"Late Night Hook" (Vexed featuring Dizzy Wright)	2019	Non-album singles
"Tryna Eat" (Trey Libra featuring Dizzy Wright)	2019	Non-album singles
"In Due Time" (Mic Strong featuring Dizzy Wright)	2019	Non-album singles
"Breathe" (Luke Wiley featuring Dizzy Wright)	2019	Non-album singles
"The Lost Cypher" (DJ Hoppa featuring Dizzy Wright, Euroz and Demrick)	2020	Non-album singles
"Spittin' Dope" (King Neptune featuring Dizzy Wright)	2020	Non-album singles
"The Business" (David Jax featuring Dizzy Wright, Euroz and Demrick)	2021	Be Careful What You Wish For

== Guest appearances ==
List of non-single guest appearances, with other performing artists, showing year released and album name
Title	Year	Other artist(s)	Album
"1st You Get The Paper"	2012	Dirty Smurf	Non-album single
"Y.B.W. (Young Black and Winning)" (Remix)	2013	Irv da Phenom, Jarren Benton	Los Kangeles LP
"Young Jedi"	2013	Logic	Young Sinatra: Welcome to Forever
"Epic"	2013	PREF1X	D.E.M.O. Diary Entries of a Man In Orbit
"Reminisce Remix"	2013	Baeza, Fashawn	Non-album singles
"Ain't Worried About Nothin'" (Skee-mix)	2013	French Montana, Crooked I, Problem, The Game	Non-album singles
"1993"	2013	LBO	Non-album singles
"Who's There"	2013	Hopsin, Jarren Benton	Knock Madness
"Plan B"	2014	Iamsu!	Sincerely Yours
"Roll Witchu"	2014	Phora	Nights Like These
"3 Days in La"	2014	Pink Grenade	Fear of a Pink Planet
"Don't Sweat It"	2015	Kryple, Merkules	Anger Management
"Vegas Nights"	2015	Tha Joker	Non-album single
"My Hippy"	2015	Mod Sun featuring Dizzy Wright	Look Up
"What a Difference"	2016	Jarren Benton, Grath, Sy Ari Da Kid	Slow Motion, Vol. 2
"Vibes"	2016	Berner, B-Real	Prohibition, Pt. 3
"Win, Lose, Draw"	2018	Demrick	Came a Long Way
"Looking Out"	2018	Demrick, DJ Hoppa, Reezy	Stoney Point 2
"Blunt Lit"	2018	Demrick, DJ Hoppa, Chris Webby	Stoney Point 2
"Flavors"	2019	Demrick, Euroz	No Wasting Time
"Callaloo”	2019	Collie Buddz	Non-album singles
"Hush (Remix)"	2019	Corey Ellis, Futuristic, Ian Matthew	Non-album singles
"Paranoid and High"	2019	Rittz	Put a Crown on It
"Morning Motivation"	2020	Jon Connor	S.O.S.
