= My Grandma's Basement =

Studio album by Jarren Benton
- Released: June 11, 2013
- Recorded: 2012–2013
- Genre: Hip-hop; horrorcore
- Length: 70:48
- Label: Funk Volume
- Producer: Kato; M16; Oh; Planet VI; Reckless Dex; Roc N' Mayne; SMKA; Spitzwell; The Kraken

Jarren Benton chronology
Freebasing with Kevin Bacon (2012)	My Grandma's Basement (2013)	Slow Motion (2015)

Singles from My Grandma's Basement
- 1. "Razor Blades and Steak Knives" Released: April 3, 2013

My Grandma's Basement is the debut studio album by American rapper Jarren Benton. The album was released on June 11, 2013, through Funk Volume and was supported by the single "Razor Blades and Steak Knives". The album features guest appearances from Dizzy Wright, Hopsin, RA the Rugged Man, SwizZz, Vinnie Paz among others, along with production from Kato, SMKA, Planet VI, and Spitzwell among others.

== Background ==
After releasing three mixtapes, The Beatgods Present Jarren Benton, Huffing Glue With Hasslehoff and Freebasing With Kevin Bacon, Jarren Benton signed to Hopsin's record label Funk Volume and begun work on his debut album, which would be titled, My Grandma's Basement. Benton explained his mindset going into his debut album saying, "This album has a different vibe. It’s a lot more personal stuff so people can learn who Jarren is." He also said it will feature a more refined production sound that translates more to his ambitions of being a household name.

== Release and promotion ==
In late 2012, Benton toured internationally with Funk Volume label mates, Hopsin, Dizzy Wright, SwizZz and DJ Hoppa for two-months, which included 54 shows in 60 days in the United States, Europe, and Australia. Following the album's release, he released music videos for multiple songs including "Go Off", "Life In the Jungle" and "We On (My Own Dick)" among others. From August 1–19, 2013 Benton toured the United States on the Grandma's Basement Tour, his first solo headlining tour.

== Commercial performance ==
My Grandma's Basement debuted and peaked at number 152 on the Billboard 200 and number four on the Billboard Heatseekers Albums chart.

== Critical reception ==
Professional ratings
Review scores
Source	Rating
AllMusic	3/5 stars
HipHopDX	3/5 stars
Smoking Section	(positive)

My Grandma's Basement was met with generally positive reviews from music critics. AllMusic gave the album a three out of five star rating saying, "With most of his lyrics lapsing into the violent specifics of how he deals with the people who cross him, but as much as shock value plays a role in the rhymes, unlike similar-minded artists like Earl Sweatshirt and the Odd Future crew, Benton's brand of horrorcore features trap beats that are made for booming speakers rather than creeping out listeners." Homer Johnsen of HipHopDX also gave a three out of five star review stating, "Benton’s array of flows is very impressive, but his rhymes are oftentimes more for shock value than true creativity. For some, this will likely limit the album’s replay value. It is as if his darker motives are justified by these flashes of artistic ingenuity, and his occasional touches of humor keep the listener interested."

== Track listing ==
No.	Title	Producer(s)	Length
1.	"Yaya" (skit)	-	0:06
2.	"Razor Blades and Steak Knives" (featuring Hemi)	Kato	4:05
3.	"Life In the Jungle"	Kato	3:38
4.	"Don't Act"	Kato	3:23
5.	"Big Rube Interlude"	-	1:35
6.	"Dreams"	Spittzwell	4:20
7.	"The Way It Goes" (featuring Planet VI)	Reckless Dex	5:09
8.	"Cadillacs & Chevys"	Roc N' Mayne	4:06
9.	"Heart Attack"	The Kraken	4:16
10.	"My Adidas"	Kato	4:06
11.	"Smells Like" (featuring R.A. the Rugged Man and Mic Buddah)	Spittzwell	3:53
12.	"Even More No Homo" (skit)	Spittzwell	3:37
13.	"Bully" (featuring Vinnie Paz)	Kato	3:40
14.	"I Deserve It"	Kato	3:24
15.	"Go Off" (featuring SwizZz and Hopsin)	M16	3:41
16.	"We On (My Own Dick)" (featuring Dizzy Wright and Pounds)	Kato	4:47
17.	"PBR & Reefer"	SMKA	3:43
18.	"OJ" (featuring Elz Jenkins)	Kato	4:29
19.	"My Grandma's Basement"	Oh	4:00

== Charts ==
Chart (2013)	Peak position
US Billboard 200	152
US Heatseekers Albums (Billboard)	4
US Independent Albums (Billboard)	28
US Top R&B/Hip-Hop Albums (Billboard)	16
