= No Shame (Hopsin album) =

Studio album by Hopsin
- Released: November 24, 2017
- Recorded: 2017
- Genre: Hip-hop
- Length: 70:22
- Label: Undercover Prodigy; 300
- Producer: Hopsin; Harry Fraud

Hopsin chronology
Pound Syndrome (2015)	No Shame (2017)

Singles from No Shame
- 1. "The Purge" Released: September 22, 2017; 2. "Happy Ending" Released: October 13, 2017; 3. "Witch Doctor" Released: November 1, 2017; 4. "Ill Mind of Hopsin 9" Released: November 23, 2017

No Shame is the fifth studio album by American rapper Hopsin. The album was released on November 24, 2017, through Undercover Prodigy and 300 Entertainment.

== Background ==
Following the release of Pound Syndrome in 2015. Hopsin announced his departure from Funk Volume in January 2016. Hopsin cited the reason was due to issues he had with co-founder Damien Ritter. In March 2016, Hopsin released "Ill Mind of Hopsin 8". The song was a diss track directed towards Damien Ritter and Funk Volume. Hopsin officially left Funk Volume after the song's release and went on to create a new label called Undercover Prodigy. The song peaked at number 21 on the Bubbling Under Hot 100 Singles chart, which became Hopsin's highest charting single to date. Hopsin went on to release more singles with his label Undercover Prodigy with, "Bout the Business", "Die This Way" and "False Advertisement".

In February 2017, Hopsin confirmed that he was working on his next album and released the single "All Your Fault". The album was rumored to be titled Savageville and was originally scheduled to be released in July 2017, however the album was delayed for unknown reasons.

== Music and lyrics ==
In an interview with XXL about the direction of the project, Hopsin said that,

"It's an album about pretty much things that have been going on over the past two years in my life. It's a lot of controversial stuff on the album that I'm speaking about, just a lot of heartfelt things, a lot of anger, aggression, sad songs. And then there's some dope songs to vibe out to as well, but it all paints a picture of what's been happening over the past few years in my life and how I've hit, like, a downfall".

== Promotion ==
=== Singles ===
"The Purge" was released as the lead single from the album on September 22, 2017. The music video for the single received over 1 million views on YouTube in its first week.

"Happy Ending" was released as the album's second single on October 13, 2017, along with a music video, which portrays him visiting an Asian massage parlor and being given a massage and sex by the Asian women in exchange for money. The music video received backlash as it presented Asian women in a racist and sexist manner, portraying them as being fetishized submissive sex objects, which are common negative stereotypes surrounding Asian women. It was further criticized for making light of a far serious issue, as female sex workers in Asian massage parlors are actually victims of human trafficking and modern day sex slavery. The original upload of the music video was removed from YouTube due to nudity.

"Witch Doctor" was released as the album's third single on November 1, 2017. The music video for the single received over 10 million views since its release.

"Ill Mind of Hopsin 9" was released as the album's fourth single on November 24, 2017, along with an accompanied music video which has received over 21 million views since its release.

=== Other songs ===
The music video for "Panorama City" was released on January 26, 2018.

The music video for "Tell'em Who You Got It From" was released on February 20, 2018.

== Critical reception ==
Professional ratings
Review scores
Source	Rating
Pitchfork	3.5/10
HipHopDX	3.9/5
XXL	3/5

No Shame was met with mixed reviews.

== Commercial performance ==
No Shame debuted at number 42 on the US Billboard 200, with 15,000 album-equivalent units, in its first week.

== Track listing ==
- All songs are produced by Hopsin, except for "Black Sheep", which is produced by Harry Fraud.

No.	Title	Writer(s)	Length
1.	"Hotel in Sydney"	Marcus Hopson	6:04
2.	"Right Here"	Hopsin	4:55
3.	"Twisted"	Hopsin	4:19
4.	"Cute in a Suit (Skit)"	Hopsin	1:05
5.	"All Your Fault"	Hopsin	4:57
6.	"Money on the Side"	Hopsin	4:40
7.	"I Wouldn't Do That"	Hopsin	4:02
8.	"Black Sheep" (featuring Eric Tucker)	Hopsin; Rory Quigley	5:16
9.	"I Must Be On Somethin"	Hopsin	4:16
10.	"Tell'em Who You Got It From"	Hopsin	5:00
11.	"The Purge"	Hopsin	3:23
12.	"Happy Ending"	Hopsin	4:38
13.	"No Words 2"	Hopsin	2:20
14.	"Panorama City" (featuring Joey Tee)	Hopsin	4:20
15.	"Ill Mind of Hopsin 9"	Hopsin, Anthony Smith	4:58
16.	"Marcus' Gospel" (featuring Michael Speaks)	Hopsin; Michael Speaks	4:01
17.	"Witch Doctor"	Hopsin	4:48
Total length:			70:22

Track notes

- "Witch Doctor" does not appear in the physical version of the album.

== Charts ==
Chart (2017)	Peak position
Australian Albums (ARIA)	37
Belgian Albums (Ultratop Flanders)	186
Canadian Albums (Billboard)	60
New Zealand Heatseeker Albums (RMNZ)	2
US Billboard 200	42
US Top R&B/Hip-Hop Albums (Billboard)	19
