= The Golden Age (Dizzy Wright album) =

Mixtape by Dizzy Wright
- Released: August 19, 2013
- Recorded: 2013
- Genre: Hip hop
- Label: Funk Volume
- Producer: AF Supreme, Aktion, Hittman, JReezy, Nicolas Pugach, Rikio, Reuben Lewis, SupaHotBeats, Wyclef Jean, DJ Hoppa, Kato, 6ix, Cardo

Dizzy Wright chronology
The First Agreement (2012)	The Golden Age (2013)	State of Mind (2014)

The Golden Age is the sixth official mixtape by American rapper Dizzy Wright. The mixtape was released on August 19, 2013, by independent record label Funk Volume for free and digital download, along with autographed hardcopies via the Funk Volume website. The mixtape featured guest appearances by Wyclef Jean, Hopsin, Joey Bada$$, Jarren Benton, SwizZz, Logic, Kid Ink and Honey Cocaine among others. Along with production from DJ Hoppa, Rikio, Kato, 6ix, and Cardo, among others. Due to its retail release, the mixtape debuted on the Billboard Top R&B/Hip-Hop Albums chart at number 39 becoming his highest charting project at the time.

== Background ==
On March 11, 2013, Dizzy released the first song from his upcoming mixtape, titled "Maintain" featuring fellow rapper Joey Bada$$. On March 26, 2013, it was announced that Wright would be a part of the XXL Magazine 2013 Freshman Class due to getting the "Peoples Choice" vote. Three days later he would release the music video for a new song titled, "Still Movin'" which featured cameos from his Funk Volume label mates which was followed by "Killem Wit Kindness" a few days later. These songs were the second and third releases from his upcoming mixtape, which was shortly announced to be titled The Golden Age. The mixtape was revealed to have a 90s influence and sample theme. Guest appearances on the mixtape included Wyclef Jean, Hopsin, Joey Bada$$, Jarren Benton, SwizZz, Logic, Kid Ink and Honey Cocaine among others. Along with production from DJ Hoppa, Rikio, Kato, 6ix, and Cardo. The mixtape was released for free, and for purchase on iTunes on August 19, 2013.

== Critical reception ==
Professional ratings
Review scores
Source	Rating
HipHopDX	(positive)

The Golden Age was met with critical acclaim from music critics. Edwin Ortiz of HipHopDX called the mixtape "EP-worthy" and said, "Despite its setbacks, The Golden Age manages to be a solid offering from Dizzy Wright. Considering the fact that he’s released four projects in the last two years, with another expected by year's’ end in The Second Agreement, it’s admirable to see a young artist continue to build without breaking stride."

== Track listing ==
No.	Title	Producer(s)	Length
1.	"2 Wings and a Crown" (featuring Irv da Phenom)	DJ Hoppa	3:36
2.	"The Flavor" (featuring SwizZz)	6ix	2:41
3.	"Maintain" (featuring Joey Bada$$)	DJ Hoppa	5:13
4.	"Progression"	Hittman	3:50
5.	"The Perspective" (featuring Chel'le)	2Lz, Eric LaVaughn Smith	4:00
6.	"Killem With Kindness"	AF Supreme	3:28
7.	"Welcome Home" (featuring Arima Ederra)	JReezy	3:27
8.	"Bout That Life" (featuring Hopsin)	6ix	4:20
9.	"Still Movin'"	JReezy	4:51
10.	"Fashion" (featuring Kid Ink and Honey Cocaine)	Nicholas Pugach	5:46
11.	"Can't Stop Won't Stop"	SupaHotBeats	3:53
12.	"Step Yo Game Up" (featuring Jarren Benton and Tory Lanez)	Kato	5:27
13.	"B.T.T."	DJ Hoppa	2:51
14.	"Untouchable" (featuring Logic and Kirk Knight)	DJ Hoppa	4:09
15.	"Tellem My Name"	Rikio	2:41
16.	"World Peace"	Rikio	4:08
17.	"Hope You Have a Good Day"	Rikio	3:10
18.	"Your Type" (featuring Chel'le)	6ix	3:44
19.	"Brodee Bro" (featuring Capo)	Cardo	3:49
20.	"The Golden Ghetto"	Reuben Lewis	3:46
21.	"We Turned Out Alright" (featuring Wyclef Jean)	Wyclef Jean, Sedeck Jean	3:55
22.	"New History"	Rikio	4:37

== Charts ==
Chart (2013)	Peak position
US Heatseekers Albums (Billboard)	15
US Top R&B/Hip-Hop Albums (Billboard)	39
