= Ill Mind of Hopsin 8 =

Single by Hopsin
- Released: March 8, 2016
- Recorded: 2016
- Genre: Hip hop
- Length: 6:30
- Label: Undercover Prodigy
- Songwriter: Marcus Hopson
- Producer: Hopsin

Hopsin singles chronology
"Fort Collins" (2015)	"Ill Mind of Hopsin 8" (2016)	"Bout the Business" (2016)

Music video
- "Ill Mind of Hopsin 8" on YouTube

"Ill Mind of Hopsin 8" is a song by American hip hop recording artist Hopsin. The song was released on March 8, 2016, and is the eighth installment in Hopsin's "Ill Mind of Hopsin" series. The song serves as a diss towards Funk Volume co-founder, Damien Ritter, who Hopsin claims is the reason why he left the label. The song is also the debut single by Hopsin's new independent record label, Undercover Prodigy. The song peaked at number 21 on the Bubbling Under Hot 100 Singles chart, which became Hopsin's highest charting single to date.

== Background ==
The track is a musical departure from the previous entries in the "Ill Mind of Hopsin" saga, as the previous tracks were considered to be conscious hip hop songs, whereas this strays from that concept, instead focusing in on becoming a diss track aimed at Damien Ritter. The song details the recent monetary disputes that had occurred during the later stage of Hopsin's time at Funk Volume, with Hopsin claiming when he created Funk Volume, he was manipulated by Ritter to make him own 50% of the record label. This, therefore, prevents Hopsin from obtaining previously unreleased material still owned by Funk Volume, following the rapper's departure.

== Music video ==
The song's accompanying music video premiered on March 8, 2016 on Hopsin's account on YouTube. Since its release, the video has received over 85 million views. The music video was directed by Hopsin himself.

== Reception ==
The song received positive reviews from critics, with HipHopDX stating the song is "nothing short of jarring" and "the unpredictable mind of Hopsin has delivered exactly what we would expect in the latest saga of Funk Volume crumbling". The song became a commercial success, achieving over 1 million views on YouTube within a week of its release.

== Controversy ==
On May 20, 2016, SwizZz released a track called "Automatic" as a response to Hopsin's diss track against his brother Dame Ritter. In SwizZz's response, he talked about his side of the story of Funk Volume's breakup, while dissing Hopsin and defending his brother Dame at the same time. SwizZz's response track was produced by himself and DJ Hoppa. SwizZz stated in an open letter to Hopsin on Facebook stating "We're both aware that our friendship has run its course for now. It's really sad things have ended the way they did, but it is what it is. Just know I have no resentment or animosity towards you. You are a profound inspiration, a musical genius, and will always be one of my favourite artists. I am immeasurably thankful for everything you've done for me Hop. I wish you the best in the next chapter of your career".

On July 15, 2016, Hopsin broke his silence on an interview with HipHopDX. The interview took place during behind the scenes of his music video of his single "Die This Way". There was no hard feelings in the interview as Hopsin said, "It wasn't disrespectful. It was more just his point of view from the situation and him just telling his opinion. He did it in a very respectful way. I can't hate him for that. I completely get it and, like said. It is what it is. I'm just going to do me and that's not going to change. I'm going to die this way.".

On February 20, 2017, Hopsin responded to SwizZz's diss in the second verse of his single, "All Your Fault". Then on April 17, 2017, SwizZz responded to Hopsin's second verse of the song "All Your Fault" in the song "Switch".

== Charts ==
Chart (2016)	Peak position
US Bubbling Under Hot 100 (Billboard)	21
US Hot R&B/Hip-Hop Songs (Billboard)	43

== Certifications ==
Region	Certification	Certified units/sales
United States (RIAA)	Gold	500,000^{‡}
^{‡} Sales+streaming figures based on certification alone.
