= Ill Mind of Hopsin 5 =

Single by Hopsin
- Released: July 18, 2012
- Recorded: 2012
- Genre: Conscious hip hop; hardcore hip hop
- Length: 4:49
- Label: Funk Volume
- Songwriter: Marcus Hopson
- Producer: Marcus Hopson

Hopsin singles chronology
"Hop Madness" (2012)	"Ill Mind of Hopsin 5" (2012)	"Ill Mind Six: Old Friend" (2013)

Music video
- "Ill Mind of Hopsin 5" on YouTube

"Ill Mind of Hopsin 5" is a song by American hip hop recording artist Hopsin. It is the fifth installment in the "Ill Mind" series and was released on July 18, 2012 by Funk Volume. In the self-produced song, Hopsin raps about his frustration with jaded youth and disenchantment towards other unrelatable rappers, a departure from the previous, more comedic "Ill Mind" songs. The song peaked at #17 on the Billboard Social 50 and R&B/Hip-Hop Digital Songs chart. The song was certified Platinum by RIAA on April 7, 2021.

== Background ==
Hopsin explained that he was originally writing a song different than the final result, reminiscent of the "wild", comedic "Ill Mind of Hopsin 4". However, Hopsin had begun building a relationship with God and felt that he could not create another "obnoxious" song, but rather something with a message: He went to the studio and wrote a majority of the song quickly and, although not sure whether his fanbase would react positively to his change, recorded the song and shot the music video a few days later. Hopsin said the people assisting at the video shoot weren't reacting to the song in his presence, making him skeptical of his choice – however, his girlfriend told him while he was away, "everybody felt bad 'cause of the song, really made them feel weird, all these parts were really talking to them."

== Reception ==
The video went viral on the day of release. It garnered over two million views in 24 hours and over five million in ten days. The song managed to chart at No. 17 on two Billboard charts: the Social 50, based on weekly additions to online fans and followers, artist page views and song plays, and the R&B/Hip-Hop Digital Songs chart, with 20 thousand downloads sold in the first day, according to Nielsen SoundScan. To date, it has over 100 million views on YouTube and remains Hopsin's most viewed video.

It also received highly positive reviews. Eric Diep of Complex wrote: "Whatever opinions you have on Hopsin, [Ill Mind of Hopsin 5] shows that he’s got serious skills with his piercing delivery."

== Charts and certifications ==
=== Weekly charts ===
Chart (2012)	Peak position
Billboard R&B/Hip-Hop Digital Songs	17

=== Certifications ===
Region	Certification	Certified units/sales
United States (RIAA)	Platinum	1,000,000^{‡}
^{‡} Sales+streaming figures based on certification alone.
