= Demrick =

American rapper

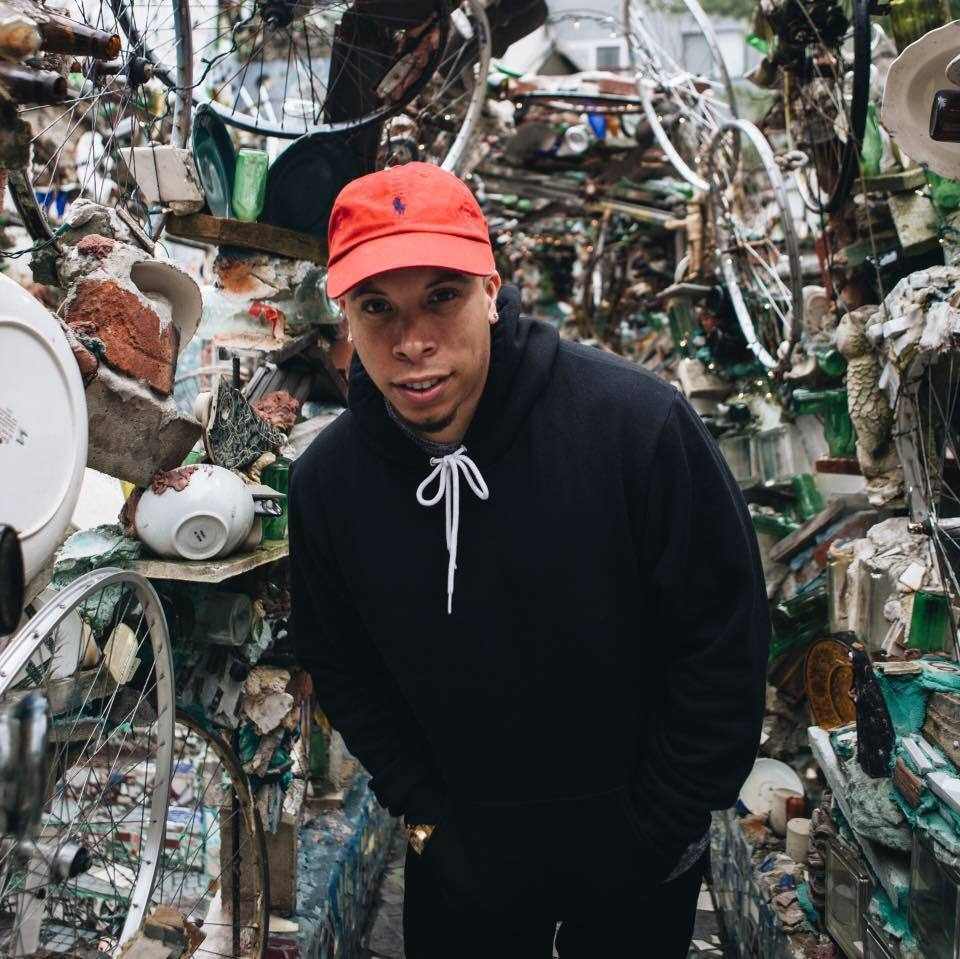

Background information
- Also known as: Demrick; Young De
- Born: Demerick Ferm; March 7, 1981 (age 45); Spokane, Washington, U.S.
- Origin: Los Angeles, California, U.S.
- Genre: Hip hop
- Occupations: Rapper; songwriter
- Years active: 2005–present
- Member of: Serial Killers

Demerick Ferm, better known by his stage name Demrick, formerly known as Young De, is a rapper from Spokane, Washington, now living in Los Angeles. He has collaborated with Xzibit, Kurupt, Snoop Dogg, Too $hort, B-Real and Cypress Hill. He is a protege of B-Real of Cypress Hill and Xzibit with whom he formed Serial Killers.

== Life and career ==
=== 2005-2010: Audio Hustlaz, Vol. 1, and Smoke N Mirrors ===
His career started in 2005 when he met Kurupt in Philadelphia, who urged him and his group Tangled Thoughts to move to California. They did, and released an album with Kurupt, Philly 2 Cali, in 2007.

In 2008, Demrick released his solo debut mixtape, Audio Hustlaz, Vol. 1, which was presented by DJ Skee. B-Real contributed to the mixtape as a producer and featured on several tracks. Later that year, Demrick released the Homeland Security mixtape, a collaboration with Shady/Interscope's artist Cashis. Homeland Security was hosted by DJ Whoo Kid and featured tracks with Royce da 5'9", Crooked I and Freeway, among others.

Demrick was featured on B-Real's first solo debut album, Smoke N Mirrors (2009), appearing on 5 of the 15 songs, including the single "Don't Ya Dare Laugh", and toured overseas with B-Real. In the middle of 2009, Demrick appeared on DJ Muggs' Soul Assassins: Intermission album, and the success of that song led him to spend two years touring with Xzibit.

In 2010 Cypress Hill released Rise Up, their eighth studio album. Demrick was featured on the single "It Ain't Nothin" and went on tour with Cypress, performing at festivals like Rock Am Ring and Rockin Rio. At the end of the year Demrick teamed up with DJ Fingaz for another mixtape, De Is for Demrick.

=== 2011-present: Urban Ammo, #HeadsUP, All The Wrong Things & Serial Killers ===
In 2011, Xzibit and Demrick released two digital singles, "Man on the Moon" and "What It Is". Videos were shot by director Matt Alonzo and led to rotation on MTV. In mid-2011, Demrick released an EP, Neva Look Back, produced by Scoop DeVille.

Demrick released his fourth mixtape, #Heads Up, in 2011. It included the singles "Money & Weed" and "Burn Out" (produced by Jim Jonsin).

In October 2013 Demrick released an album with the hip hop group Serial Killers, alongside Xzibit and B-Real.

== Discography ==
=== Albums ===
- Losing Focus (with Cali Cleve) (2015)
- Collect Call (2016)
- Came a Long Way (2018)
- No Wasting Time (2019)
- The Plot (2020)
- Payday (2021)

=== Collaborative albums ===
- Stoney Point (with DJ Hoppa and Cali Cleve) (2015)
- Loud Pack: Extracts (with Scoop Deville) (2015)
- One Week Notice (with Dizzy Wright, Audio Push, Jarren Benton, Emilio Rojas, Reezy, DJ Hoppa, and Kato) (2018)
- Stoney Point 2 (with DJ Hoppa) (2018)
- Stoney Point 3 (with DJ Hoppa) (2021)

=== Mixtapes ===
- "tangledthoughts/" (Tangled Thoughts - T.H.O. (Tha Free Mixtape))
- Audio Hustlaz, Vol. 1" (Presented by DJ Skee)
- "Homeland Security" (with Cashis) (2008)
- "De Is for Demrick" (with DJ Fingaz, produced by 21 the Producer)
- " Neva LOOK Back" (Produced entirely by Scoop DeVille)
- "#HeadsUP" (Features by Brevi and Xzibit)
- "All The Wrong Things" (produced by The Makerz)(2012)
- All the Wrong Things 2 (2013)
- Serial Killers, Vol. 1 (with Xzibit & B-Real as Serial Killers) (2013)
- WingsUP - EP (2013)
- The Murder Show (with Xzibit & B-Real as Serial Killers) (2015)
- Blaze With Us (with Dizzy Wright) (2016)
- Day of the Dead (with Xzibit & B-Real as Serial Killers) (2018)
- Blaze With Us 2 (with Dizzy Wright) (2020)
- Summer of Sam (with Xzibit & B-Real as Serial Killers) (2020)
- Championship Rounds - EP (with Mike & Keys) (2021)
- First & Jefferson EP (with Jake One) (2025)

=== Featured singles ===
- "It Ain't Nothin'" (with Cypress Hill)
- "Blaze of Glory"
- "Man on the Moon" (with Xzibit)
- "What It Is" (with Xzibit)

=== Guest appearances ===
Year	Song	Artist(s)	Album
2009	"Don't You Dare Laugh"	B-Real, Xzibit	Smoke N Mirrors
2009	"6 Minutes"	B-Real, Tekneek	Smoke N Mirrors
2009	"10 Steps Behind"	B-Real, Tekneek	Smoke N Mirrors
2009	"Dr. Hyphenstein"	B-Real, Snoop Dogg, Trace Midas	Smoke N Mirrors
2009	"Figure It Out"	Soul Assassins	Soul Assassins: Intermission (Presented by DJ Muggs)
2010	"It Ain't Nothin'" (Writers credits)	Cypress Hill	Rise Up (Via Capitol Records)
2011	"What It Is"	Xzibit	Urban Ammo 2 Xtreme Music/Sony Singles
2011	"Man on the Moon"	Xzibit	Urban Ammo 2 Xtreme Music/Sony Singles
2012	"Medicated"	Cypress Hill, Rusko	Cypress X Rusko
2012	"Movies"	Xzibit, The Game, Crooked I, Slim The Mobster	Napalm
2012	"Killer's Remorse"	Xzibit, B-Real, Bishop Lamont	Napalm
2012	"Crazy"	Xzibit, B-Real, Jelly Roll	Napalm
2013	"The Pain"	Cashis, Sara Shine	The County Hound 2
2014-2015-2016	"Xanax and Patron"	B-Real, Berner	Prohibition
2014-2015-2016	"Why Not"	Cashis, Kurupt, Freeway	Euthansia
2014-2015-2016	"Leave No Witness"	DJ Hoppa, SwizZz	Hoppa & Friends
2014-2015-2016	"Break It Down"	DJ Hoppa	Hoppa & Friends
2014-2015-2016	"Marijuana"	B-Real, B-Legit, Berner	Prohibition, Pt. 3
2014-2015-2016	"Mental"	Madchild	Silver Tongue Devil
2014-2015-2016	"Triple Threat"	Madchild, Slaine	Silver Tongue Devil
2014-2015-2016	"Slayer"	Madchild	Silver Tongue Devil
2017	"Make Moves Wit Me"	Dizzy Wright	The Golden Age 2
2017	"Sativa"	Chris Webby, B-Real, Zacari	Webster's Laboratory II
2017	"Gold and Silver Circles"	Dizzy Wright, Audio Push	State of Mind 2
2017	"The One"	Jarren Benton	The Mink Coat Killa
2018	"Brothers"	Sammy Adams	Nice Manor Volume 2
2019	"More And More"	Dizzy Wright	Nobody Care's, Work Harder
2020	"New Year, New Me"	Ramaj Eroc	—N/a

== In popular culture ==
In December 2023, Demrick's single, "Lights", was broadcast from radio stations in Fortnite during the video game's first season of its fifth chapter.
