= Whatever You Need =

Whatever You Need may refer to:

- "Whatever You Need" (Tina Turner song), 2000
- "Whatever You Need" (Meek Mill song), 2017
- "Whatever You Need", a 1998 song by East 17 from Resurrection
- "Whatever You Need", a 1995 song by Michael Speaks
