= Pound Syndrome =

Studio album by Hopsin
- Released: July 24, 2015
- Genre: Hip-hop
- Length: 58:45
- Labels: Funk Volume; Warner Bros.
- Producer: Hopsin

Hopsin chronology
Knock Madness (2013)	Pound Syndrome (2015)	No Shame (2017)

Singles from Pound Syndrome
- 1. "Ill Mind of Hopsin 7" Released: July 18, 2014; 2. "Crown Me" Released: June 1, 2015; 3. "Fly" Released: July 8, 2015; 4. "Fort Collins" Released: September 3, 2015

Pound Syndrome is the fourth studio album by American rapper Hopsin. The album was released on July 24, 2015, through Funk Volume and Warner Bros. Records.

The album was supported by four singles: "Ill Mind of Hopsin 7", "Crown Me", "Fly" and "Fort Collins". Pound Syndrome was the last release on the label Funk Volume, which was co-owned by Hopsin, before the label disbanded in 2016.

== Background and recording ==
In 2014, prior to the announcement of Pound Syndrome, Hopsin had been hinting about quitting rap music and moving to Australia. However, on December 25, 2014, Hopsin shared a video on his YouTube channel, called "The REAL reason Hopsin left the music industry" with his label-mate Jarren Benton, which was inspired by the film Dumb and Dumber To, which he stated that he is not quitting rap and it was all a gag, revealing that Pound Syndrome will be releasing in 2015. After the release of his fellow label-mates projects (Dizzy Wright's The Growing Process and Jarren Benton's Slow Motion EP), Hopsin began recording Pound Syndrome, which was rumored to be a song, but instead it was later announced to be his fourth full-length album. Recording sessions for the album took place over the course of the year.

== Release and promotion ==
While visiting through multiple interviews, Hopsin has been stating that the album is an "improvement" over his previous releases as the terms of quality. On May 27, 2015, his interview was released on Sway Calloway's YouTube channel, touching on his appearance at Soundset Music Festival, and announcing that Pound Syndrome would be released on July 24, 2015. In an interview, he said that this is "definitely the best album that [he's] ever created, hands down." On July 8, 2015, Hopsin released the album's final track listing.

On July 18, 2014, Hopsin released a video for his song, titled "Ill Mind of Hopsin 7", five months prior to the announcement of Pound Syndrome as the official lead single. The song sparked controversy, as Hopsin details his lost faith in religion, and the connections between religion, history and governance.

On June 1, 2015, Hopsin released a song, titled "Crown Me", as the second single from the album with an accompanying music video. "Fly" was released as the third single from the album on July 8, 2015. The music video for the intro track "The Pound" was released on the same night as the album's release. The album's fourth and final single, "Fort Collins" was released on September 3, 2015. The song features guest vocals from his then Funk Volume label-mate and fellow rapper Dizzy Wright.

== Critical reception ==
Professional ratings
Review scores
Source	Rating
AllMusic	3.5/5 stars
HipHopDX	3.5/5 stars
XXL	(XL)

Homer Johnsen of HipHopDX classified the album as "a wonderfully chaotic immersion into the ill mind of Hopsin", praising Hopsin for his voice delivery, production and lyrical acrobats on the album. Darryl Robertson of XXL stated that "Overall, Pound Syndrome is an album that one can download and let ride non-stop from front to back. When Hopsin isn’t dropping 16s aimed at his fellow MCs, it seems that hip-hop is Hopsin’s conduit to release the heavy thoughts and multitudes of life’s ills from his third eye, a refreshing break from the more common ego trips that drive much of todays hip-hop."

== Commercial performance ==
Pound Syndrome debuted at number 17 on the US Billboard 200, with first week sales of 17,149 copies. It was the eleventh highest-selling album in the United States that week.

== Track listing ==
- All songs are produced by Hopsin.

No.	Title	Writer(s)	Length
1.	"The Pound"	Marcus Hopsin	1:43
2.	"Forever III"	Hopsin	4:21
3.	"No Hope"	Hopsin	4:56
4.	"Ramona" (featuring Jarren Benton)	Hopsin; Jarren Benton	4:27
5.	"Mr. Jones"	Hopsin	3:25
6.	"Fort Collins" (featuring Dizzy Wright)	Hopsin; La'Reonte Wright	4:32
7.	"No Words"	Hopsin	1:36
8.	"Crown Me"	Hopsin	4:33
9.	"Ill Mind of Hopsin 7"	Hopsin	5:39
10.	"FV Till I Die" (featuring SwizZz)	Hopsin; Justin Ritter	4:53
11.	"My Love"	Hopsin	5:12
12.	"No Fucks Given"	Hopsin	4:05
13.	"Fly"	Hopsin	5:00
14.	"I Just Can't"	Hopsin	4:23
Total length:			58:45

== Charts ==
=== Weekly charts ===
Chart (2015)	Peak position
Australian Albums (ARIA)	15
Belgian Albums (Ultratop Flanders)	198
Canadian Albums (Billboard)	12
New Zealand Albums (Recorded Music NZ)	24
US Billboard 200	17
US Top R&B/Hip-Hop Albums (Billboard)	6

=== Year-end charts ===
Chart (2015)	Position
US Top R&B/Hip-Hop Albums (Billboard)	94
