= The Growing Process =

Studio album by Dizzy Wright
- Released: May 26, 2015
- Recorded: 2014–2015
- Genre: Conscious hip hop; hip hop
- Length: 58:26
- Label: Funk Volume; Warner
- Producer: 21 the Producer; 6ix; Roc N' Mayne; SnizzyOnTheBeat; Money Montage; Smokey Morrison; King Vay; Darryl "WayneBeats" Overdiep; Freeze On The Beat; MLB; Rikio; Louie Haze; Alex Lustig; SDot Fire

Dizzy Wright chronology
SmokedOut Conversations (2011)	The Growing Process (2015)	Wisdom & Good Vibes (2016)

Singles from The Growing Process
- 1. "Train Your Mind" Released: February 17, 2015; 2. "Floyd Money Mayweather" Released: March 17, 2015; 3. "False Reality" Released: May 24, 2015

The Growing Process is the second studio album by American rapper Dizzy Wright. It was released on May 26, 2015, by Funk Volume and Warner Records. The album features guest appearances from Big K.R.I.T., Tech N9ne, Hopsin, Krayzie Bone, Layzie Bone, Jarren Benton, SwizZz, Berner, and Mod Sun, among others.

The album peaked at number 47 on the Billboard 200 chart.

== Critical response ==
Dylan Yates of The Metropolist wrote: "While no new topics are covered within Dizzy's latest offering, The Growing Process is a solid attempt on the Las Vegas rappers part to give props to the lyrical aesthetic of the genre. An aesthetic, he suggests, that was more prevalent in rap 20 years ago. It also provides a soundscape rich enough to keep even the average Hip Hop listener's interest piqued." Nicholas DG of HotNewHipHop explained that even the applause-worthy messages of these songs wind up getting downplayed, sharing verse-vacancy with cocky bars, like, for example, on "Train Your Mind", where Dizzy attempts to take onus for molding rap culture and the community before putting himself on a pedestal.

== Commercial performance ==
In its opening week, the album sold 8,575 copies.

== Track listing ==
No.	Title	Producer(s)	Length
1.	"Higher Learning (Intro)"	King Vay	2:38
2.	"God Bless America" (featuring Chel'le, Big K.R.I.T., & Tech N9ne)	SnizzyOnTheBeat	4:46
3.	"Can I Feel This Way"	Roc N' Mayne	3:54
4.	"No Time Is Better" (featuring Irv Da Phenom)	DJ Hoppa	3:08
5.	"Train Your Mind"	Smokey Morrison	3:52
6.	"Regardless" (featuring Layzie Bone)	FreezeOnTheBeat	3:58
7.	"Don't Ever Forget" (featuring Krayzie Bone)	Money Montage	3:48
8.	"Floyd Money Mayweather"	Louie Haze, Roc N' Mayne	3:14
9.	"Smoke You Out" (featuring Mod Sun)	SDot Fire	2:54
10.	"Good Vibes"	21 the Producer	2:48
11.	"I Can Tell You Needed It" (featuring Berner)	WayneBeats	5:08
12.	"Smoke Box (Interlude)"	6ix	1:30
13.	"Explain Myself" (featuring Jarren Benton, SwizZz, & Hopsin)	Hopsin	4:11
14.	"False Reality"	Rikio	2:53
15.	"Daddy Daughter Relationship"	Alex Lustig	3:34
16.	"Will It Last" (featuring Njomza)	MLB	4:10

== Personnel ==
Credits for The Growing Process adapted from AllMusic.

- Dizzy Wright – primary artist, creative direction
- Hopsin – composer, engineer, featured artist, producer, re-assembly
- Alon Eida – engineer

== Charts ==
Chart (2015)	Peak position
US Billboard 200	47
US Top R&B/Hip-Hop Albums (Billboard)	5
