= State of Mind (EP) =

EP by Dizzy Wright
- Released: April 15, 2014
- Recorded: 2013–14
- Genre: Hip hop
- Label: Funk Volume
- Producer: MLB, Roc & Mayne, Sledgren, 6ix, 1stBorn, Ron Hayden

Dizzy Wright chronology
The Golden Age (2013)	State of Mind (2014)	The Growing Process (2015)

Singles from State of Mind
- 1. "Everywhere I Go" Released: April 8, 2014

State of Mind is the second extended play by American rapper Dizzy Wright. It was released on April 15, 2014, by Funk Volume. The EP features production by 6ix, MLB, Roc & Mayne, Ron Hayden and Sledgren, along with a lone guest appearance by Rockie Fresh. It was supported by the single: "Everywhere I Go". Upon its release, the EP debuted at number 54 on the Billboard 200.

== Background ==
After the release of the mixtape The Golden Age, Dizzy Wright announced that he was planning to release the EP, titled The Second Agreement, and then he would release his second album. Starting in 2014, Wright began touring with Hopsin on the Knock Madness world tour. On February 16, 2014, Dizzy Wright announced he would be releasing State of Mind, a new EP, during March 2014, replacing the previously announced The Second Agreement EP.

In the following month, in an interview with XXL, Dizzy Wright said that the State of Mind had no current release date and confirmed his second studio album would be released during 2014. He said in an interview that he didn't want to rush the release at the expense of quality.

On April 8, Wright revealed the cover artwork and release date of April 15, 2014, for the EP. That same day, Dizzy Wright released the first single "Everywhere I Go". As promised, the EP was released on April 15, 2014. It featured production by 6ix, MLB, Roc N Mayne, Ron Hayden, and Sledgren, along with a guest appearance by Rockie Fresh. On April 21, 2014, the music video was released for "Everywhere I Go".

== Critical reception ==
Professional ratings
Review scores
Source	Rating
HipHopDX	2.5/5 stars
XXL	(L)

Upon its release, State of Mind was met with generally positive reviews from music critics. Gregory Heaney of AllMusic said, "While Dizzy might claim that "You don't know shit about me" from a position of relative obscurity on "Nuttin' Bout Me," an EP this solid is going to have a whole lot of people interested in rectifying that situation as quickly as possible." Praverb of XXL gave the album an L rating, saying "With stellar production, improved songwriting, and a mesmerizing approach, Dizzy is destined to shine a lot brighter. Dizzy still has room for improvement, though, as flashes of transparency here only hold him back from being greater. Let this glimpse of Dizzy's cognitive state be a proper warm-up to his sophomore effort." Sheldon Pierce of HipHopDX said, "Despite flashes of the creativity that powered his earlier projects, Dizzy Wright's State of Mind is plagued by subpar production and a lack of identity."

== Commercial performance ==
The album debuted at number 54 on the Billboard 200 chart, with first-week sales of 6,800 copies in the United States.

== Track listing ==
No.	Title	Producer(s)	Length
1.	"State of Mind"	MLB	3:28
2.	"Everywhere I Go"	MLB	3:25
3.	"Reunite for the Night"	Roc & Mayne	3:51
4.	"Too Real for This" (featuring Rockie Fresh)	MLB	3:28
5.	"Nuttin Bout Me"	Sledgren	3:44
6.	"New Generation"	6ix	4:38
7.	"Calm Down"	1stBorn	4:48

== Charts ==
Chart (2014)	Peak position
US Billboard 200	54
US Top R&B/Hip-Hop Albums (Billboard)	11
