= Michael Speaks =

American singer-songwriter (born 1977)

- Born: Michael Speaks; 1977 (age 48–49); Benton Harbor, Michigan, Michigan, United States
- Genres: R&B, gospel, soul
- Occupations: Musician, songwriter
- Instrument: Vocals
- Years active: 1995–present
- Labels: Mecca Don/EastWest Records(1995–1998); Epic/Sony Records (2000–2002); MSpeakOut Productions/Introspect Music Group (2009–present)
- Website: facebook.com/theemichaelspeaks

Michael Speaks (born 1977) is an American R&B and gospel singer/songwriter originally from Benton Harbor, Michigan. He is best known for his singles "Whatever You Need" and "Just Wanna (Dance Now)", in addition to his appearance on the first season of America's Got Talent.

== Biography ==
Speaks moved to New York City, where he drew crowds by singing in subway stations. He eventually signed a record deal with East West Records. He later joined the band Next Movement first as a temporary member, then as a full member.

In the years since, Speaks has formed his own band, Hypnotic. He also performs regularly with Mocha, a group composed of former Next Movement members.

In August 2013, Speaks issued On the Move Again, featuring the single "What Would You Do". Also in 2013, he released the digital single "God Can Do Anything" on iTunes and other services.

In 2017, he featured on Hopsin´s song "Marcus' Gospel" off his album No Shame.

He's been a part of the StarOne All-Stars band at Blue Martini Las Vegas for many years. In April 2024, he began his Sunday residency as the lead singer at the Sin City Seafood Lounge.

== Discography ==
=== Albums ===
Year	Album	Chart positions	
Year	Album	US	US R&B
1995	No Equal	–	59
2000	Praise at Your Own Risk	–	–
2013	On The Move Again	–	–

=== Singles ===
Year	Single	Chart positions		Album
Year	Single	US	US R&B	Album
1995	"Whatever You Need"	–	85	No Equal
1995	"I Specialize"	–	66	No Equal
2000	"Just Wanna (Dance Now)"	–	–	Praise at Your Own Risk
2000	"Praise Him (Move Somethin')"	–	–	Praise at Your Own Risk
2010	"What Would You Do"	–	–	On The Move Again
2013	"God Can Do Anything"	–	–	On The Move Again

=== Non-album appearances ===
- "You Don't Have to Cry" (with Adina Howard) – Do You Wanna Ride? (1995)
- "So Right For Life" – Set It Off OST/Missing You (with Brandy, Gladys Knight, Chaka Khan & Tamia) (CD Single B-Side) (1996)
- "Ordinary People" (with Sa Deuce) – Sa Deuce (1996)
- "Losing U" (with Nadanuf) – Worldwide (1998)
- "Praise Your Problems Away" – Spirit Rising, Vol. 2: Inspirational (2003)
- "Marcus' Gospel" (with Hopsin) - No Shame (2017)
- “Found the One” (with Augmented Soul) - Found the One - EP (2020)
