= Emilio Rojas =

American rapper from New York

- Also known as: Raks One
- Born: April 16, 1984 (age 42); Rochester, New York
- Genres: Hip hop
- Occupations: Rapper; songwriter
- Years active: 2004–present
- Website: http://emiliorojasmusic.com/

Emilio Rojas is an American rapper.

== Biography ==
=== Early life ===
Emilio Rojas was born to a Venezuelan father and an American mother in the suburbs of Rochester. At age 10, Emilio's father left his family and returned to Venezuela, leaving Emilio and his family to fend for themselves. Despite this, Rojas has credited his father for sparking his interest in music.

Rojas graduated from The Harley School in 2002.

=== Career ===
After making a name for himself as Raks One on Myspace, Rojas began taking his music much more seriously and decided to drop out of school to pursue a career in Hip Hop. In 2004 he made his first break through and began touring overseas with the group Phocus, but by 2005 it was apparent to Emilio that not enough progress was being made in his career.

In 2005 Emilio took a car service to New York City to focus solely on his music. Without hesitation he did and ended up in an illegally subdivided Brooklyn apartment. It was in New York where Rojas began to make a dent in the Hip Hop industry by rapping at open-mic nights in Brooklyn and elsewhere. Working with producers such as M-Phazes helped land him notoriety locally. By 2007 he began touring internationally again in places such as Venezuela and Europe.

Around 2008, mainstream producer DJ Green Lantern had noticed Rojas' music and began working with him on numerous projects such as 2010's Life Without Shame mixtape. Long anticipated "Breaking Point" was released on January 26, 2012, as a dual project with DJ Green Lantern. On June 11 his Mixtape No Shame No Regrets dropped. In August 2024, Rojas called out DJ Khaled for his refusal to speak out about Palestinian rights amid the Gaza war and humanitarian crisis in Gaza, despite DJ Khaled being of Palestinian descent.

== Discography ==
=== Albums ===
| Year | Album |
|---|---|
| 2004 | A Vision and a Plan (with Phocus) |
| 2006 | A Breath of Fresh Air |
| 2007 | For Good (as Raks One) |
| 2009 | DJ Green Lantern Presents Emilio Rojas: The Natural (with DJ Green Lantern) |
| 2009 | Recession Proof |
| 2010 | Life Without Shame |
| 2011 | Phaze One (with M-Phazes) |
| 2012 | Breaking Points |
| 2013 | No Shame No Regrets |
| 2014 | NoFucksGiven |
| 2018 | One Week Notice (with DJ Hoppa, Dizzy Wright, Audio Push, Demrick, Jarren Benton, Reezy and Kato) |
| 2018 | Life Got In The Way (with Illmind) |
| 2018 | Omen (with Jarren Benton and Hi-Rez) |

=== Singles and extended plays ===
According to Apple Music.

| Year | Single |
|---|---|
| 2013 | Ziggy |
| 2013 | Hold Up |
| 2014 | Trouble (featuring N.O.R.E.) |
| 2014 | B*tch is Crazy (featuring Joe Budden) |
| 2015 | Nada (featuring Joell Ortiz) |
| 2015 | Imagine That (featuring DeVo D) |
| 2015 | On Top (featuring Mark Battles) |
| 2015 | L.I.F.E. EP |
| 2016 | I Hate Donald Trump |
| 2016 | F**k With The People That F**k With You |
| 2017 | Nights Like This |
| 2017 | S.O.S. (featuring Gill Graff, Shaqisdope and Bernz) |
| 2017 | Lost My Way (with Hi-Rez featuring Dani Devinchi) |
| 2017 | Nada (Remix) [with Dave East] |
| 2017 | Not That Bad (with Forever M.C., Kxng Crooked and Hi-Rez) |
| 2017 | Vámonos |
| 2018 | Walk Through Fire (featuring Sebastian Mego) |
| 2018 | The Gossip (Remix) [with Hi-Tone and Nick Grant] |
| 2018 | Used To (with Jarren Benton, Rexx Life Raj and Kato) |
| 2018 | Cannot Stop Me (with Justin Stone) |
| 2018 | Big Facts (featuring Demrick and Bodega Bamz) |
| 2018 | The Fallen (with JdotLittles and Eaze) |
| 2018 | Next (with Justin Stone) |
| 2018 | Good Thing (with Hi-Rez) |
| 2019 | Get Out My Face (with Hi-Rez and Iman) |
| 2019 | Spite |
| 2019 | On The Move (with Rowlan) |
| 2019 | Never Satisfied (with Jag) |
| 2019 | New Ones |
| 2019 | Way Too Long (with Yonas) |
| 2019 | Communicate |
| 2019 | Easy (with Bobby Saint and Jarren Benton) |
| 2019 | Yo Se (with Andy Mineo) |
| 2019 | No Mas |
| 2019 | Heni (with NFA and Breakfast N Vegas) |
| 2020 | Trouble (with Nick Dean) |
| 2020 | Mira (with Futuristic and Nate Brush) |
| 2020 | Catfish (with Hi-Rez and Kato) |
| 2020 | Stronger (with Hi-Rez and Ericka Guitron) |
| 2020 | Brighter Days (with Gene Noble) |
| 2020 | Long Overdue - EP (with Hi-Rez, Ericka Guitron and Kato) |
| 2020 | Hundred Thousand Times (with Nikal Fieldz) |
| 2020 | Craziest Place 2.0 (with Drei Ross and Mark Battles featuring Sy Ari Da Kid) |
| 2020 | Make A Scene |
| 2021 | Rise Up - EP |
