= Undercover Prodigy =

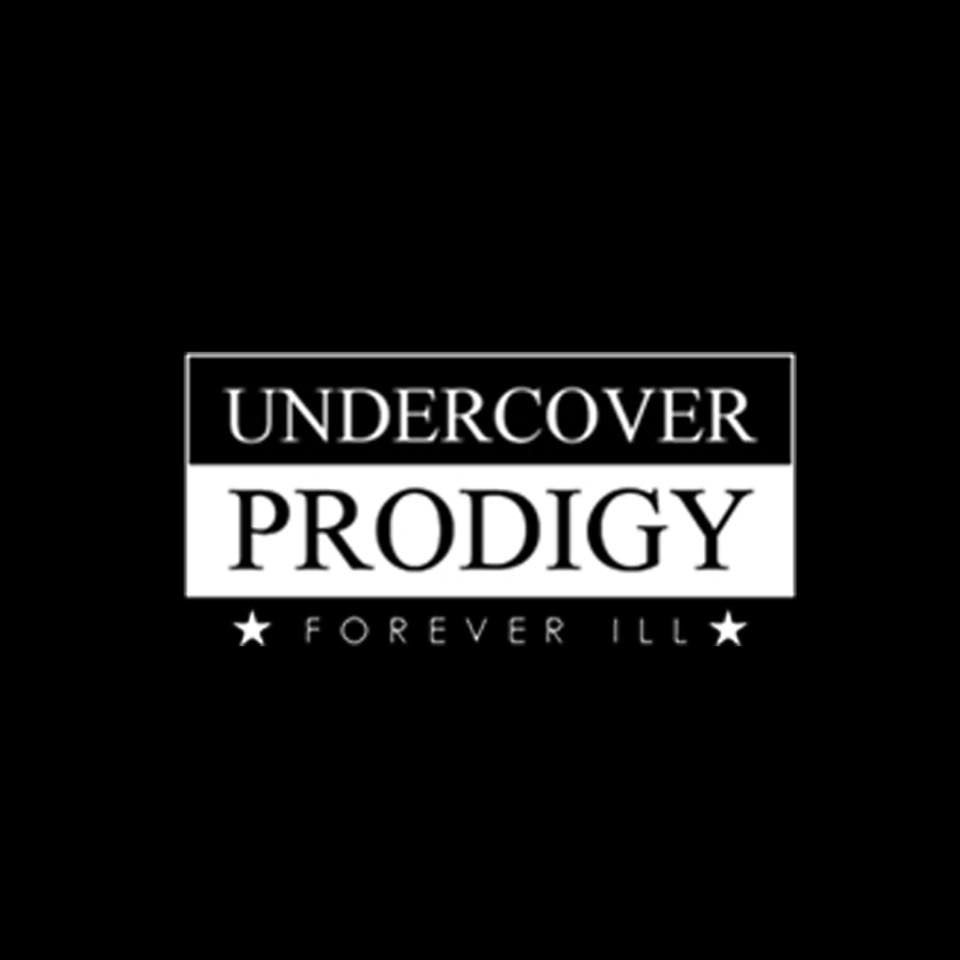
- Founded: 2016
- Founder: Hopsin
- Status: Active
- Distributors: 300 Entertainment (2017); various (2018-present)
- Genre: Hip hop
- Country of origin: United States
- Location: Panorama City, California
- Official website: undercoverprodigy.com

Undercover Prodigy is an American independent record label and production company founded by rapper Hopsin.

== History ==
Originally intended to be the name of his clothing line announced in late 2014, with the logo being prominently visible in the music video for "Fort Collins" (the final single Hopsin released on Funk Volume), the rapper formally announced Undercover Prodigy as the name of his new independent record label, following his departure from Funk Volume, in early 2016.

Production immediately began on "Ill Mind of Hopsin 8", the next episode in the "Ill Mind of Hopsin" saga. The song was released on March 8, 2016, and details the reasoning behind Hopsin's decision to leave Funk Volume, the issues with Damien "Dame" Ritter, and the status of Undercover Prodigy. It also serves as a diss track towards Ritter. The song peaked at number 21 on the Bubbling Under Hot 100 Singles chart, which became Hopsin's highest charting single to date. Hopsin's second song under the label, "Bout the Business", was released on April 20, 2016, with the song detailing the vision behind the label, and the direction in which Hopsin would like to take the label in. Hopsin released his third single under the label titled "Die This Way" featuring Matt Black and Joey Tee on May 31, 2016. The following single "False Advertisement" was released on August 26, 2016. On February 20, 2017, Hopsin released his next single titled "All Your Fault".

On September 22, 2017, Hopsin released “The Purge”. It was released as the lead single from his fifth studio album titled No Shame. The following single, "Happy Ending", was released on October 13, 2017, along with an accompanied music video which was removed from YouTube due to nudity. In the same month, Hopsin confirmed in an interview that he signed a distribution deal with 300 Entertainment. On November 1, 2017, Hopsin released the single "Witch Doctor" and announced the release date for No Shame. The album was released on November 24, 2017.

== Discography ==
Artist	Album	Album details
Hopsin	No Shame (released with 300 Entertainment)	Released: November 24, 2017; Peaked at number 42 on the US Billboard 200 chart.
