= The Mink Coat Killa =

Studio album by Jarren Benton
- Released: June 23, 2017
- Genre: Hip-hop
- Length: 50:59
- Label: Benton Enterprises

Jarren Benton chronology
Slow Motion Vol. 2 (2016)	The Mink Coat Killa (2017)	One Week Notice (2018)

Singles from The Mink Coat Killa
- 1. "C.R.E.A.M. '17" Released: June 2, 2017; 2. "Again" Released: June 19, 2017

The Mink Coat Killa is the third studio album by American rapper Jarren Benton. It was released on June 23, 2017, on Benton's independent record label "Benton Enterprises".

== Background ==
The song "C.R.E.A.M. 17" was described as Wu-Tang-inspired. It is Benton's first project since nearly a year. Consisting of 15 songs, the album features several collaborations.

== Track listing ==
No.	Title	Length
1.	"The God Intro"	2:10
2.	"C.R.E.A.M. '17"	3:59
3.	"Designer Belts"	4:10
4.	"Again"	4:27
5.	"$30k Mink"	2:45
6.	"The One"	3:23
7.	"Tears"	4:19
8.	"Black Jesus"	1:28
9.	"Ill Nigga"	2:23
10.	"The Break Up"	3:05
11.	"Passenger Side"	3:54
12.	"Fuck Everybody"	4:03
13.	"Mental Issues"	4:04
14.	"Gun Shot"	4:03
15.	"The Stylist"	2:45
Total length:		50:59
