= Audio Push =

American hip hop group

- Origin: Inland Empire, California, U.S.
- Genre: Hip hop
- Years active: 2006−present
- Labels: Hits Since '87; Interscope
- Members: Oktane; Price
- Website: audiopush.com

Audio Push is an American hip hop duo from Inland Empire, California. The group consists of Oktane (Julian Browne) and Price (Larry Jacks, Jr.).

== Career ==
In 2009, the duo were signed to Interscope Records, and they had their first hit single with the track, titled "Teach Me How to Jerk". In 2012, they signed with Hit-Boy's record label, named "Hits Since 87 Inc", which is a part of the Interscope Records, while it was running independently by Hit Boy.

== Discography ==
=== Studio albums ===
- 90951 (2016)
- Last Lights Left (2017)
- One Week Notice (with Dizzy Wright, Jarren Benton, Demrick, Emilio Rojas, Reezy, DJ Hoppa and Kato) (2018)
- Cloud 909 (2018)

=== Mixtapes ===
- The Soundcheck (2009)
- The Backstage Pass (2010)
- The Intermission (2010)
- 7th Letter (2011)
- My Turn (2011)
- Truth Be Told (2012)
- Inland Empire (2012)
- Come as You Are (2013)
- The Good Vibe Tribe (2015)
- My Turn II (2015)
- My Turn III (2017)

=== Extended plays ===
- The Stone Junction (2016)
- Inside The Vibe (2016)
- The Throwaways (2017)
- Melange (2018)
- Inside The Vibe 2 (2018)
- Somethin 2 Hold You (2018)
- Audio Mars (2019)
- No Rest... For The Blessed (2020)
- Exhale (2020)
- No Rest... For The Blessed II (2020)

=== Singles ===
List of singles as lead artist, showing year released and album name
| Title | Year | Album |
|---|---|---|
| "Teach Me How to Jerk" | 2009 | Non-album single |
| "Up n Down" | 2010 | The Soundcheck |
| "It's Going Up" (featuring Soulja Boy) | 2010 | 7th Letter |
| "Body Rock" (featuring Mann) | 2010 | Non-album single |
| "Extras" | 2012 | Truth Be Told |
| "Wassup" | 2012 | Truth Be Told |
| "Shine" | 2013 | Come as You Are |

=== Guest appearances ===
List of non-single guest appearances, with other performing artists, showing year released and album name
| Title | Year | Other artist(s) | Album |
|---|---|---|---|
| "Goldie" (Freestyle) | 2012 | Hit-Boy, K. Roosevelt | —N/a |
| "Top Notch" | 2012 | Brianna Perry | Symphony No. 9 |
| "Top Notch" | 2013 | Brianna Perry | Symphony No. 9: The B Collection |
| "Them Niggas" | 2013 | HS87, K. Roosevelt | All I've Ever Dreamed Off |
| "You Wouldn't Believe It" | 2013 | HS87, Hit-Boy, K. Roosevelt | All I've Ever Dreamed Off |
| "What a Feeling" | 2013 | HS87, Hit-Boy, Kent M$NEY | All I've Ever Dreamed Off |
| "Caution" | 2013 | HS87, Hit-Boy | All I've Ever Dreamed Off |
| "No Chaser" | 2013 | HS87, K. Roosevelt | All I've Ever Dreamed Off |
| "T.U." | 2013 | HS87, Problem, Hit-Boy, Juicy J | All I've Ever Dreamed Off |
| "Cypher" | 2013 | HS87, Hit-Boy, Kent M$NEY, B Mac the Queen, Schoolboy Q, Casey Veggies, Xzibit, Rick Ross, Method Man, Redman, Raekwon | All I've Ever Dreamed Off |
| "Shoe Box Money" | 2013 | HS87, Hit-Boy, Kent M$NEY | All I've Ever Dreamed Off |
| "Only Right" | 2013 | HS87, K. Roosevelt | All I've Ever Dreamed Off |
| "All I've Ever Dreamed Off" | 2013 | HS87, Hit-Boy, K. Roosevelt, Robin Thicke | All I've Ever Dreamed Off |
| "Lay Up" | 2013 | Funkmaster Flex, Hit-Boy | Who You Mad At? Me or Yourself? |
| "Plug Music" | 2014 | HS87, Tish Hyman, Hit-Boy, B. Carr, B-Mac the Queen, N.No, Kent M$NEY, K. Roosevelt | We the Plug |
| "Stripes" | 2014 | HS87, Hit-Boy, B-Mac the Queen, Preach | We the Plug |
| "Scorn" | 2014 | HS87, Hit-Boy, Kid Cudi, Kent M$NEY | We the Plug |
| "Members Only" | 2014 | HS87, Hit-Boy, B-Mac the Queen, Kent M$NEY, K. Roosevelt, James Fauntleroy | We the Plug |
| "Parade" | 2014 | HS87 | We the Plug |
| "B.B.H." | 2014 | HS87, B-Mac the Queen, Hit-Boy | We the Plug |
| "Grindin' My Whole Life" | 2014 | HS87, N.No, B. Carr, Hit-Boy, Big Hit, B-Mac the Queen, Kent M$NEY | We the Plug |
| "Give It All" | 2015 | Tech N9ne, Krizz Kaliko | Special Effects |
| "All Good" | 2016 | Trae tha Truth, Rick Ross, T.I | Tha Truth, Pt. 2 |
| "Gold and Silver Circles" | 2017 | Dizzy Wright, Demrick | State of Mind 2 |
