= SwizZz =

American rapper (born 1987)

- Born: Justin Ritter; September 28, 1987 (age 39)
- Origin: San Fernando Valley, California, U.S.
- Genre: West Coast hip-hop
- Occupations: Rapper; songwriter
- Years active: 2003–present
- Label: Funk Volume

Justin Ritter (born September 28, 1987), known professionally as SwizZz, is an American rapper. He is best known for his collaborations with fellow rapper Hopsin, having signed with his record label, Funk Volume, in 2009. He has released two mixtapes including Haywire (2009) with Hopsin, and Good Morning SwizZzle (2011).

== Early life ==
SwizZz initially met Hopsin in high school, where they were classmates and became close friends. After high school SwizZz got accepted into the University of California, Irvine, but after two years he decided to put his education on hold, while he would pursue a career in music. He was having a hard time figuring out what he wanted to major in, and he could not find anything he was passionate about in school.

== Musical career ==
=== 2009–2012: Forming Funk Volume and Good Morning SwizZzle ===
In 2009, Hopsin founded his own independent record label, Funk Volume, with Damien Ritter. SwizZz, who is Damien Ritter's younger brother became the first artist to be signed to Funk Volume. Shortly after launching Funk Volume, Hopsin and SwizZz released a collaborative mixtape titled Haywire on June 18, 2009, to promote the label. Funk Volume originally wanted to sell it for retail sale, but were unable due to Hopsin still being contracted by Ruthless Records at the time. On mixtape website DatPiff, it has been certified Gold for being downloaded over 100,000 times, and it was later made available for purchase for digital download on iTunes and Amazon.com.

SwizZz was featured on three songs from Hopsin's second studio album Raw (2010). The music video for their collaboration, "How Do You Like Me Now" was released on February 25, 2011. Following that he went on the I Am RAW 30-date tour with Hopsin in support of Raw and in promotion of his upcoming mixtape. On June 25, 2011, SwizZz released his debut solo mixtape Good Morning SwizZzle, along with saying his debut album tentatively titled, Rock, Paper, SwizZzors would be released in 2012. On December 11, 2011, Funk Volume released a song "Funk Volume 2012", featuring Hopsin, SwizZz, and new Funk Volume signee Dizzy Wright.

In April 2012, SwizZz released a music video for "Crank". He was featured on Stevie Stone's "Raw Talk" along with Hopsin, from his 2012 album Rollin' Stone. He was also the only member of Funk Volume, to be featured on Dizzy Wright's debut studio album SmokeOut Conversations (2012). He was also featured on Dizzy Wright's "Independent Living", which also featured Hopsin.

=== 2012–2015: Touring with Funk Volume ===
Throughout late 2012, SwizZz toured internationally with Hopsin, Dizzy Wright, Jarren Benton and DJ Hoppa on the Funk Volume 2012 Tour. Their concert tour included 44 shows in 50 days, and was the subject of a documentary released on November 11, 2013. On January 24, 2013, Funk Volume released the music video for "Funk Volume 2013" featuring the entire roster; Hopsin, Dizzy Wright, SwizZz, Jarren Benton, and DJ Hoppa. On June 11, 2013, the music video was released for "Go Off" by Jarren Benton featuring Hopsin and SwizZz, the third single from his debut studio album My Grandma's Basement. Three days later, SwizZz released a remix to "Versace" titled "Bukkake". Following the release of Benton's album, Funk Volume revealed Dizzy Wright's EP, The Second Agreement and SwizZz debut album would be the label's next two releases, not including Hopsin's third studio album Knock Madness.

On August 1, 2013, SwizZz premiered his debut solo single, the self-produced "Zoom In", along with its music video. HipHopDX profiled the song saying, "SwizZz provides an introspective look into his current mindset and outlook. SwizZz is grinding now, seemingly more focused than ever, and this type of dedication and output will ensure he doesn't get slept-on for much longer." The song was then released to retail sale as a digital download on August 9, 2013. On August 12, Dizzy Wright released the music video to the SwizZz-featuring "The Flavor", from his mixtape The Golden Age. SwizZz was then featured on "Jungle Bash" from Hopsin's third studio album Knock Madness.

In November 2013, SwizZz stated that his debut studio album would be released in early 2014. He commented on the delay saying, "Once you get your head and your mind right and your personal life situated, that’s what’s next. It's like, how are you going to make music or try to present an image or something like that when you don't even know who you are as a person? That's the main battle that I was dealing with—just getting my mind right."

=== 2016–present: Funk Volume's break up, hiatus, and various singles ===
In April 2016, SwizZz posted on Facebook that he will be releasing music after a long hiatus.

On May 13, 2016, SwizZz released the single "Extra". One week later, he released a single titled, "Automatic" as a response to Hopsin's track, "Ill Mind of Hopsin 8". In his response, he talked about his side of the story of Funk Volume's breakup, while dissing Hopsin and defending his brother Dame at the same time. SwizZz's response track was produced by himself and DJ Hoppa. He later went on to release various singles throughout 2016–2020, and collaborations with artists such as Brains Mcloud, Artist Mikael, and Jarren Benton.

== Influences ==
SwizZz has said he is inspired by all types of music, from hip-hop and alternative rock, to trance and R&B. Some of his favorite artists include Jay-Z, Tupac Shakur, Eminem, DMX, 50 Cent, Taking Back Sunday, The Used, and Circa Survive.

== Discography ==
=== Mixtapes ===
List of mixtapes, with selected details
| Title | Album details |
|---|---|
| Haywire (with Hopsin) | Released: June 18, 2009; Label: Funk Volume; Format: Digital download |
| Good Morning SwizZzle | Released: June 24, 2011; Label: Funk Volume; Format: Digital download |

=== Extended plays ===
List of extended plays, with selected details
| Title | Album details |
|---|---|
| Sessions | Released: April 15, 2020; Label: Self-released; Format: Digital download, streaming |

=== Singles ===
==== As lead artist ====
List of singles as a lead artist, showing year released and album name
| Title | Year | Album |
|---|---|---|
| "Lucifer Effect" (with Hopsin) | 2009 | Haywire |
| "Bad Motherfucker" (with Hopsin) | 2009 | Haywire |
| "Funk Volume 2013" (with Hopsin, Dizzy Wright, Jarren Benton and DJ Hoppa) | 2013 | Non-album singles |
| "Zoom In" | 2013 | Non-album singles |
| "Dead Candy" (with Brains McLoud and The Jokerr) | 2015 | Dark Matter |
| "Extra" | 2016 | Non-album singles |
| "Automatic" | 2016 | Non-album singles |
| "More to Say" | 2016 | Non-album singles |
| "All In" | 2016 | Non-album singles |
| "Make You Proud" | 2016 | Non-album singles |
| "User Friendly" (with Brains McLoud, Cryptic Wisdom and The Jokerr) | 2016 | Dark Matter |
| "Fishy" | 2016 | Non-album singles |
| "Running" (featuring Irv da Phenom) | 2016 | Non-album singles |
| "Take Me Away" (featuring Irv da Phenom) | 2016 | Non-album singles |
| "Switch" | 2017 | Non-album singles |
| "Out of My Hands" | 2018 | Non-album singles |
| "Good Enough" (with Jae Williams) | 2019 | Non-album singles |
| "More to Go" | 2019 | Non-album singles |
| "Flex" | 2019 | Non-album singles |
| "Breakthrough" | 2019 | Non-album singles |
| "Celebrate" | 2019 | Non-album singles |
| "Sense" | 2020 | Non-album singles |
| "Hills" | 2020 | Non-album singles |
| "Where Are They Now" | 2020 | Non-album singles |
| "Loophole" | 2020 | Non-album singles |
| "Seasons" | 2020 | Non-album singles |
| "Locked In" (featuring Irv da Phenom and Bo) | 2020 | Non-album singles |
| "People Talk" (with Jae Williams) | 2020 | Non-album singles |
| "Pages Turning" (with Akt Aktion and Futuristic featuring The Kaleidoscope Kid) | 2020 | Non-album singles |
| "Savage in the Sanctuary" (with Jarren Benton) | 2020 | Non-album singles |

==== As featured artist ====
List of singles as a featured artist, showing year released and album name
| Title | Year | Album |
|---|---|---|
| "Night Crawler" (Lucid featuring SwizZz) | 2012 | Non-album singles |
| "Favorite Rapper" (Seven Cities Syndicate featuring SwizZz and Jesse Taylor) | 2012 | Non-album singles |
| "The Game" (Tilt featuring SwizZz) | 2013 | Non-album singles |
| "Dedicated" (Nay Nay featuring SwizZz) | 2013 | Non-album singles |
| "My Grave" (Def Note featuring SwizZz and DJ Hoppa) | 2017 | Non-album singles |
| "Am I a Legend?" (Shaggy No Scoob featuring SwizZz) | 2019 | Non-album singles |
| "Infinite" (Wes Yee featuring SwizZz and Freeloader MC) | 2019 | Non-album singles |
| "Can't Be Bothered" (All the Meaning featuring SwizZz) | 2019 | Non-album singles |
| "Drop It" (Mekhi featuring SwizZz) | 2019 | Mistaken Vibes |
| “Jill” (Dai-Sensei featuring SwizZz) | 2024 | |

=== Guest appearances ===
List of non-single guest appearances, with other performing artists, showing year released and album name
| Title | Year | Other artist(s) | Album |
|---|---|---|---|
| "Outcast" | 2010 | KidCrusher, Chico | The Grinch |
| "I Am RAW" | 2010 | Hopsin | Raw |
| "How You Like Me Now" | 2010 | Hopsin | Raw |
| "I'm Not Crazy" | 2010 | Hopsin, Cryptic Wisdom | Raw |
| "Raw Talk" | 2012 | Stevie Stone, Hopsin | Rollin' Stone |
| "Go Off" | 2013 | Jarren Benton, Hopsin | My Grandma's Basement |
| "Long Days, Cold Nights" | 2013 | Futuristic | Chasing Down a Dream |
| "The Flavor" | 2013 | Dizzy Wright | The Golden Age |
| "Jungle Bash" | 2013 | Hopsin | Knock Madness |
| "There Will Be Blood" | 2013 | Mike Bars | 3P |
| "Hallelujah" | 2015 | Jarren Benton, Dizzy Wright | Slow Motion |
| "Home Invasion" | 2015 | DJ Hoppa, Hopsin | Hoppa and Friends |
| "Leave No Witness" | 2015 | DJ Hoppa, Jarren Benton, Demrick | Hoppa and Friends |
| "Hoppa's Cypher" | 2015 | DJ Hoppa, Hopsin, Dizzy Wright, Jarren Benton | Hoppa and Friends |
| "Explain Myself" | 2015 | Dizzy Wright, Hopsin, Jarren Benton | The Growing Process |
| "Nobody's Safe" | 2015 | DJ Hoppa, Demrick, Jarren Benton, Madchild | Stoney Point |
| "FV Till I Die" | 2015 | Hopsin | Pound Syndrome |
| "Lycanthropy Pt. II" | 2019 | Wolff, Con-Crete, Reverend Fang Gory, Hellusin8, Bliss, Odium, Skeddy J., Jade The Nightmare, Legacey, Jenocia X, Donnie Menace, Sin, GrewSum, Chuckklez, Hell'z Labyrinth, Komatose, HellSpawn Hoodlum, Crusher The Immortal | Bearer of Death |
