= DJ Hoppa =

American DJ & record producer (born 1983)

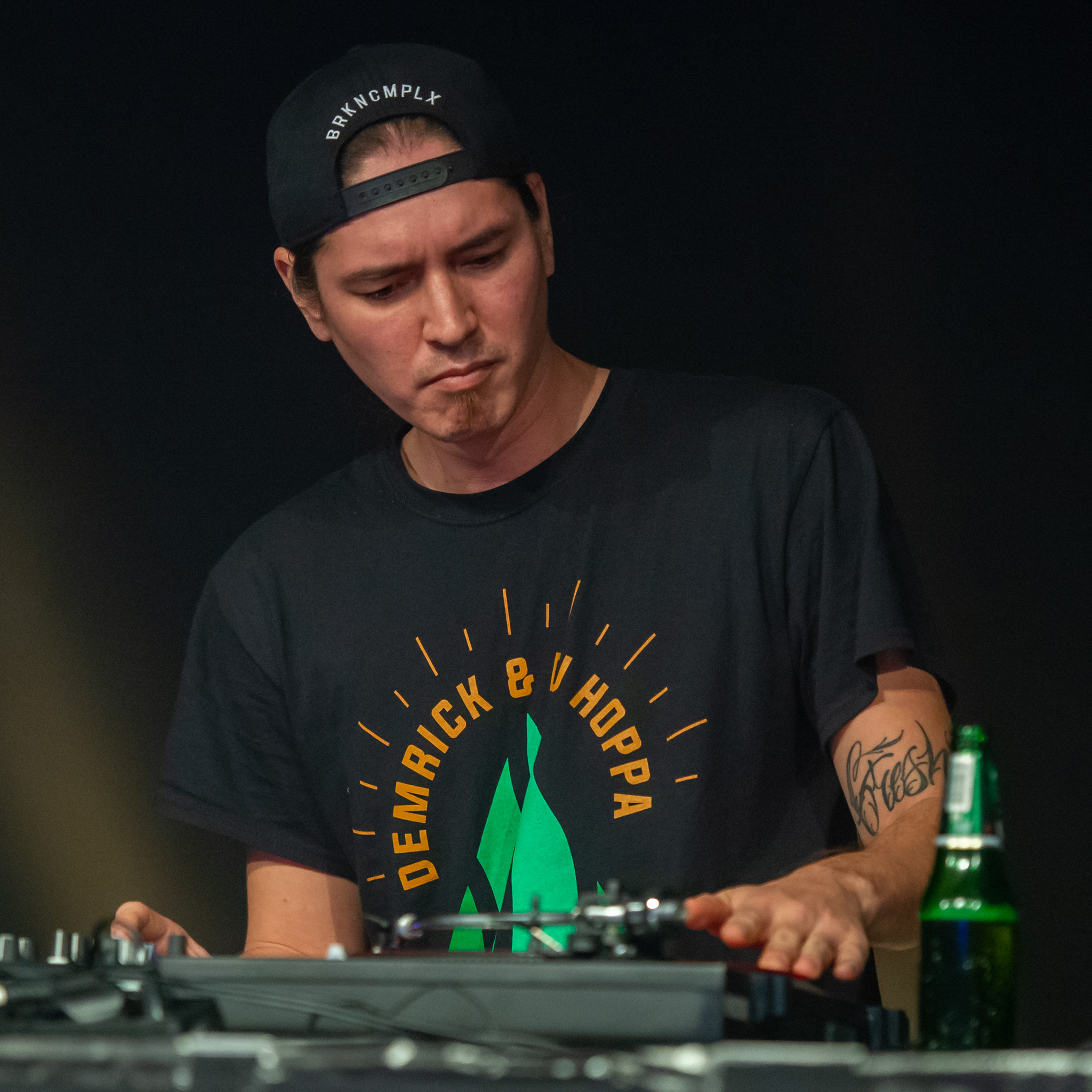
- DJ Hoppa in 2019

Background information
- Also known as: Hoppa
- Born: April 28, 1983 (age 43)
- Origin: Panorama City, Los Angeles
- Genres: Hip hop
- Occupations: Disc jockey, record producer
- Years active: 2004–present
- Labels: Funk Volume, Broken Complex
- Website: myfunkvolume.com/artist/dj-hoppa/

DJ Hoppa (born, April 28, 1983) is an American DJ and producer from Panorama City, Los Angeles. He was signed to rapper Hopsin's now defunct record label Funk Volume, and CEO of the San Fernando Valley independent label Broken Complex located in North Hollywood, California. He has made beats for Dizzy Wright's The Golden Age mixtape, The First Agreement EP and SmokeOut Conversations, Jarren Benton's My Grandma's Basement, and also worked with SwizZz & Gavlyn.

== Early life ==
Hoppa was born on April 28, 1983, to a trumpeter and a cellist. In 1992, his father died. In a September 2004 interview, he revealed that he had taken up beat making and production in high school. His first gig was at a house party.

== Musical career ==
DJ Hoppa released his first album, To April From June, in August 2004; the duplication costs of which were funded by Hoppa's friends after they were impressed by the quality of the album. Not much was heard of him in 2005, but in 2006 he produced Bliss n Eso's Up Jumped the Boogie, which charted in Australia. His next album, Avantgardening: Cultivating Food for Thought, was released in September 2007 and was in collaboration with Mine+Us (pronounced minus). Another collaboration, this time with Sirah, followed; Clean Windows Dirty Floors was released in 2007 and was noted for containing "a winning mix of wit, humor, ability, and perspective". Hoppa's next work, Volume One, was an album billed under "Hop & Pop" which was in collaboration with General Populous.

In 2009, he released his second solo album, Network Networth, which contained his hit single Up Jumped the Boogie. He then released another collaboration with Mine+Us called Day By Day. The following year, a collaboration with Cleen and General Populous was released called "DJ Hoppa Presents Cleen and General Populous: Cleen Pop Music".

2011 saw singles being released from Hoppa. Pretending featuring Max Star and Intuition was released as a single in February 2011. In addition, Hoppa produced Sirah's single "God's Grace", released in March 2011. "You're a 6, I'm a 10" featuring Dirtbag Dan and Abel Abilities, was released as a single in June 2011.

In 2012, Hoppa and Mine-Us produced their third collaboration album, Everything Is A-Okay; its title track was commended as "an uplifting track telling the listeners to not give up and to look forward, amongst all the crap that might be coming upon them. It's a great beat accompanied by tried and true rhymes. The video is rugged with glitchy shots of Mine+US rapping his verses".

In 2013, Hoppa teamed up with Self Provoked for an album called The Decade, which was praised as "chopped up stylings of Self Provoked over the ever dope DJ Hoppa's happy go lucky bangers". A single, "All Falls Together" featuring Dizzy Wright, was released from the album.

He has shared the stage with Immortal Technique, Ghostface Killah to Kid Sister and The Crystal Method.

== Critical reception ==
Said Jamey Bresden of The Deli Magazine:

"Whether sampling other artists or composing his own beats, DJ Hoppa has an innate sense of groove that never comes across as manufactured or mechanical. He borrows sparingly and delivers tastefully -- never running classic tracks into the ground, but presenting them as gentle reminders of the better days, back in the day."

== Discography ==
=== Studio albums ===
List of albums, with selected chart positions
Title	Album details
Hoppa and Friends	Released: March 31, 2015; Label: Funk Volume, Broken Complex; Format: CD, Digital download
Stoney Point (with Demrick)	Released: June 9, 2015; Label: Broken Complex; Format: CD, Digital download
One Week Notice (with Dizzy Wright, Audio Push, Demrick, Emilio Rojas, Reezy, Jarren Benton, and Kato)	Released: January 5, 2018; Label: Broken Complex; Format: CD, Digital download
