= Jarren Benton =

American rapper (born 1981)

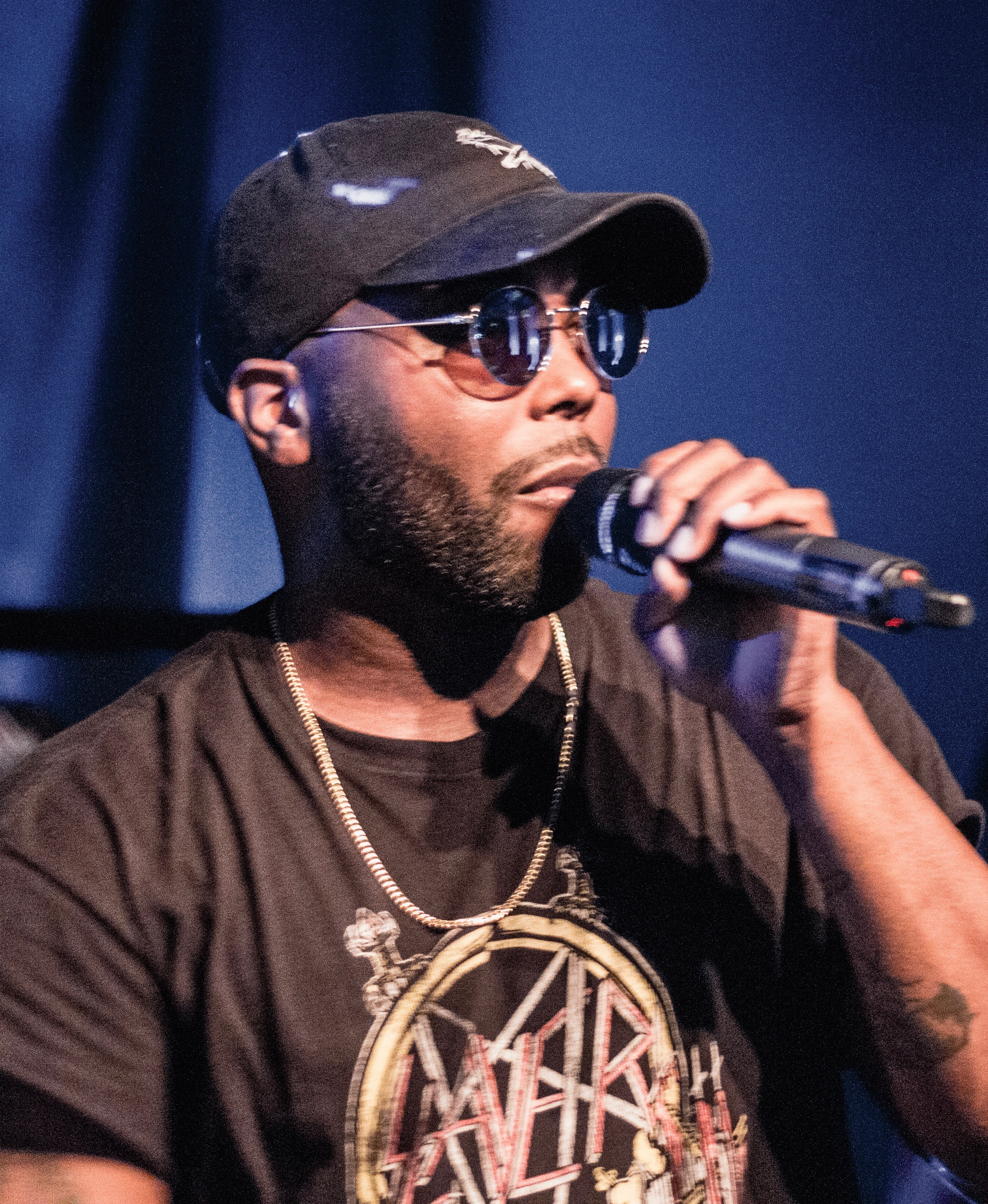
- Benton performing in 2017

Background information
- Born: Jarren Giovanni Benton; October 26, 1981 (age 44); Decatur, Georgia, U.S.
- Genre: Southern hip-hop
- Occupations: Rapper; songwriter
- Years active: 2004–present
- Labels: Roc Nation; Universal; Benton Enterprise; Fontana; Funk Volume; Warner
- Children: 3
- Website: jarrenbenton.com

Jarren Giovanni Benton (born October 26, 1981), is an American rapper from Decatur, Georgia. He signed with California rapper Hopsin's independent record label Funk Volume in 2012, and released his third mixtape, Freebasing with Kevin Bacon in June of that year. His debut studio album, My Grandma's Basement (2013) received positive critical reception and entered the Billboard 200. After the label shut down in 2016, Benton signed with Jay-Z's Roc Nation two years later to release his fourth album, Yuck Fou (2018).

== Early life ==
From his early youth, Benton aspired to be a rapper. He told XXL, "I started trying to rap pretty young and the shit was kind of whack and then I got a little older and I started going around Atlanta performing at certain showcases. I got a little name for myself, but it was kind of hard in Atlanta, just due to the type of music that comes from there, which is you know, typical down south shit." He credits his musical influences as OutKast, Goodie Mob, Dr. Dre, Ludacris, EL-P, Busta Rhymes, Sean Price, Redman, Wu-Tang Clan, Eminem, Ras Kass, Nine Inch Nails, Chino XL, Deftones, and Marilyn Manson.

== Musical career ==
=== 2009–2012: Mixtapes and signing with Funk Volume ===
On August 5, 2009, Benton released his first official mixtape titled, Jarren Benton: The Mixtape, produced entirely by The Beatgods. On January 25, 2011, Benton released a collaboration mixtape with producer SMKA. The mixtape titled Huffing Glue With Hasselhoff was supported by the lead single "Get a Load of Me". He soon begun to gain attention after the release of his song "Skitzo". American underground rapper Hopsin would watch the music video, and passed it on to Funk Volume CEO Dame Ritter. Ritter would contact Benton a few months later and then in May 2012, Hopsin and Ritter signed Benton to their Funk Volume record label.

He had previously been courted by industry heavyweights such as Erick Sermon and No ID for major label record deals, with labels such as Def Jam Recordings and Interscope Records, however he chose to sign with the independent record label Funk Volume. His first project on Funk Volume, a mixtape titled Freebasing with Kevin Bacon would be released on June 28, 2012. The mixtape featured guest appearances from Dizzy Wright, Rittz, Freeway, Gangsta Boo, Jon Connor, and Planet VI among others.

=== 2012–2015: My Grandma's Basement and Slow Motion ===
In late 2012 he toured internationally with Hopsin, Dizzy Wright, SwizZz and DJ Hoppa for two-months, which included 54 shows in 60 days in the United States, Europe, and Australia. He explained his mindset going into his debut album saying, "This album has a different vibe. It's a lot more personal stuff so people can learn who Jarren is." He also said it will feature a more refined production sound that translates more to his ambitions of being a household name. On June 11, 2013, Benton would release his debut studio album, My Grandma's Basement, on Funk Volume. The album featured guest appearances by Dizzy Wright, Hopsin, R.A. the Rugged Man, Vinnie Paz and SwizZz. My Grandma's Basement debuted and peaked at number 152 on the Billboard 200 and number four on the Billboard Heatseekers Albums chart. He released music videos for multiple songs including "Go Off", "Life In the Jungle" and "We On (My Own Dick)" among others.

On August 2, 2013, R.A. the Rugged Man released the remix to his song "Underground Hitz" featuring Hopsin and Benton. From August 1–19, 2013, Benton toured the United States on the Grandma's Basement Tour, his first solo headlining tour. Then, Benton went on "The Life And Times Tour" with Strange Music rapper Rittz and Atlantic Records rapper Snow Tha Product, the tour went from October 31 to December 8, 2013. Benton also featured on Hopsin's third studio album, Knock Madness, on the song "Who's There" with Funk Volume label mate Dizzy Wright. Benton received the most fan-votes votes, earning a spot on the 2014 XXL freshman class and was named the "People's Champ". He was the oldest rapper that had ever been selected to the list at 32. From April 9 to June 28, 2014, Benton was touring with Tech N9ne, Freddie Gibbs and Krizz Kaliko on the Independent Grind Tour 2014. On January 27, 2015, Benton released his debut extended play, Slow Motion, named after an old friend and fellow rapper who had recently died at the time. The EP debuted and peaked at number 168 on the Billboard 200 chart.

=== 2016–2017: Slow Motion, Vol. 2 and The Mink Coat Killa ===
On July 22, 2016, Benton released his second studio album, and his first one under his newfound independent record label Benton Enterprises, Slow Motion, Vol. 2, the sequel to his 2015 EP, Slow Motion. On June 23, 2017, Benton released his third studio album titled, "The Mink Coat Killa", and supported by two singles from the album "C.R.E.A.M. 17" featuring Nick Grant being released on June 1, and "Again" featuring Aleon Craft being released on June 19, from the album. Initially, Benton stated that this project was intended to be a Wu-Tang Clan tribute project, the title of the project being a reference to his Wu-Tang name "The Mink Coat Killa."

=== 2018–present: One Week Notice and Yuck Fou ===
On January 5, 2018, Benton, with the record label StillMovin, released a collaboration project titled, One Week Notice. The album was created when StillMovin label owner Damian Ritter got Benton together with Dizzy Wright, Audio Push, Demrick, Emilio Rojas, Reezy, DJ Hoppa, and Kato to record an album in one week. On June 29, 2018, Benton and Kato released the single "Don't Need You" featuring Hopsin and announced a collaborative album. On July 25, Benton and Kato released the single "Money Bag" featuring Jay Park, and announced that their collaborative album, Yuck Fou, would be released under Roc Nation.

In 2022 he released the satirical single "Nancy" about former Speaker of the United States House of Representatives Nancy Pelosi with rapper Samson.

== Personal life ==
Benton was married and has three children.

== Discography ==
Studio albums

- Jarren Benton Meets Smka: Huffing Glue With Hasselhoff (2011)
- Freebasing With Kevin Bacon (2012)
- My Grandma's Basement (2013)
- Slow Motion (2015)
- Slow Motion, Vol. 2 (2016)
- The Mink Coat Killa (2017)
- Yuck Fou (2018)
