= Funk Volume =

Defunct Record label (2007-2016)

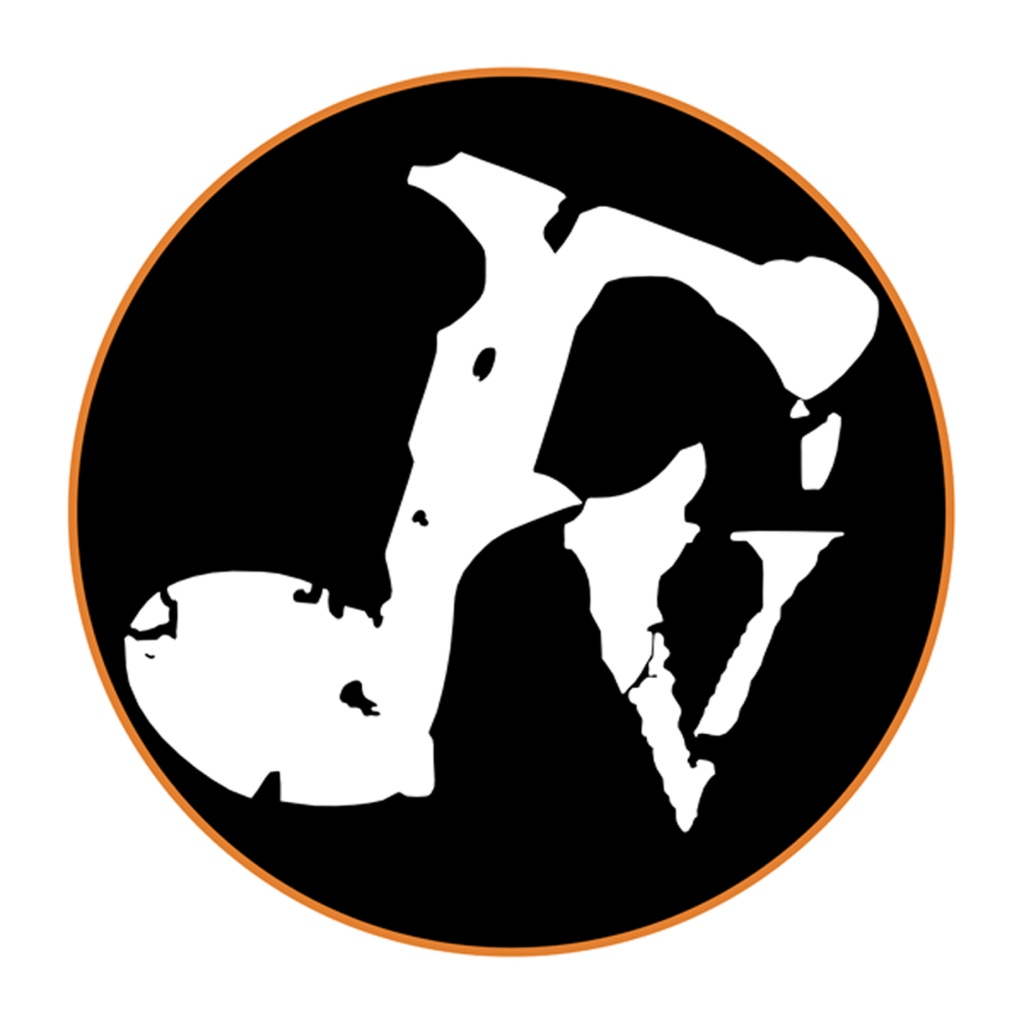
- Founded: 2007
- Founder: Hopsin; Damien Ritter
- Defunct: 2016
- Status: Defunct
- Distributor: Warner Bros. Records
- Country of origin: United States
- Location: Los Angeles, California

Funk Volume was an American independent record label founded by American rapper Hopsin and Damien Ritter in 2007. The label was home to artists Dizzy Wright, Jarren Benton, SwizZz, and producers DJ Hoppa and Kato before its 2016 dissolution. It did so due to financial alterations, and following their feud, Hopsin decided to leave the label, which resulted in its signees following suit. The label was shut down soon after, although Hopsin and Ritter reconciled in 2021.

== History ==
=== Formation and success (2007–2015) ===
Following an ill-fated record deal with Ruthless Records rapper Hopsin founded the independent record label Funk Volume, while Dame Ritter acted as business manager over all the artists and the label. To start the label, Hopsin went on LegalZoom, set up the business, and got the papers in the mail. The first rapper to be signed to Funk Volume would be Damien Ritter's younger brother and high school friend of Hopsin, SwizZz. The first project released by Funk Volume would be a collaboration mixtape between the two flagship artists, Hopsin and SwizZz titled Haywire on June 18, 2009. They originally wanted to sell it for retail sale, but were unable due to Hopsin still being contracted by Ruthless Records at the time. The first official album to be released on Funk Volume would be Hopsin's second studio album Raw in November 2010, which was supported by the singles "Sag My Pants" and "Nocturnal Rainbows".

In November 2011, Las Vegas rapper Dizzy Wright was signed to Funk Volume after they were "impressed by his smooth flow, confident stage presence, and energy that won over the crowd." In early 2012, Hopsin would expand his roster by signing Atlanta rapper Jarren Benton, who would then release a mixtape Freebasing With Kevin Bacon in June 2012. Dizzy Wright would be the first artist besides Hopsin, to release an official studio album on Funk Volume, which would be titled, SmokeOutConversations on April 20, 2012. It was followed by an EP titled The First Agreement in December 2012. Both peaked in the top 50 of the US Billboard Top R&B/Hip-Hop Albums chart. Jarren Benton would release his debut studio album My Grandma's Basement on June 11, 2013. My Grandma's Basement peaked at number four on the Billboard Heatseekers Albums chart and number 152 on the Billboard 200.

On August 9, 2013, SwizZz released the first single, "Zoom In" from his untitled 2014 debut album. On August 20, 2013, Damien Ritter revealed in an interview that he had talked to many labels about distribution deals, but decided against it until the label built its brand more. He also stated that a Funk Volume compilation album would be released in the future. On September 18, 2013, Funk Volume revealed they had expanded their production division to include Kato and Rikio. The label then released Hopsin's Knock Madness on November 26, 2013. With the help of Empire Distribution, Knock Madness became the first Funk Volume release to be distributed in CD format to retail stores. In May 2014, Jarren Benton became the third Funk Volume artist in as many years to be named to the XXL freshman class. In 2015 Funk Volume signed a distribution deal with Warner Bros. Records.

=== Dame Ritter and Hopsin feud (2016) ===
On January 7, 2016, Hopsin posted on Instagram that Funk Volume was officially "dead". He cited the reason as co-founder Dame Ritter "wanting to control too much". Upset with the disrespect from his co-worker, Hopsin went on Instagram and threatened to leave Funk Volume if Ritter did not. Hopsin officially left the label 2 months later and is now under his own company, Undercover Prodigy.

== Former acts ==
| Act | Years on the label | Projects under Funk Volume | Description |
|---|---|---|---|
| Hopsin | 2009–2016 | 4 | Rapper from Panorama City, Los Angeles, he co-founded the label with Damien Ritter in 2009. He released three albums and a collaborative mixtape with SwizZz under the label. |
| SwizZz | 2009–2016 | 2 | Rapper from Panorama City, Los Angeles. Although he was the first artist to be signed to Funk Volume, other than Hopsin, he never released an album under the label. He did release one mixtape, and a collaborative mixtape with Hopsin. |
| Dizzy Wright | 2012–2016 | 6 | Rapper from Las Vegas, Nevada. He was signed after Funk Volume co-founder, Dame Ritter, found him on YouTube and showed him to Hopsin. He released two albums, two EPs and two mixtapes under the label. |
| Jarren Benton | 2012–2016 | 3 | Rapper from Decatur, Georgia. He was signed to the label after one of Hopsin's friends showed him the video for Jarren's song "Skitzo". He released two albums "My Grandma's Basement" and "Freebasing With Kevin Bacon" and an EP under the label. |
| DJ Hoppa | 2012–2016 | 1 | DJ/producer from Panorama City, Los Angeles. He has been the touring DJ and an in-house producer for the label since 2011. He released one album under the label |
| Kato | 2012–2016 | 1 | In-house producer for the label. He was introduced to the label through being affiliated with Jarren Benton prior to his signing to Funk Volume. A year after Jarren was signed, they signed Kato as well. He released one album under the label. |

== Discography ==
| Artist | Album | Album details |
|---|---|---|
| SwizZz & Hopsin | Haywire | Released: June 18, 2009. |
| Hopsin | Raw | Released: November 19, 2010.; Peaked at number 46 on the US Billboard Heatseekers Albums chart. |
| Dizzy Wright | SmokeOutConversations | Released: April 20, 2012.; Peaked at number 42 on the US Billboard Top R&B/Hip-Hop Albums chart. |
| Dizzy Wright | The First Agreement EP | Released: December 3, 2012; Peaked at number 41 on the US Billboard Top R&B/Hip-Hop Albums chart. |
| Jarren Benton | My Grandma's Basement | Released: June 11, 2013; Peaked at number 152 on the US Billboard 200 chart. |
| Hopsin | Knock Madness | Released: November 26, 2013; Peaked at number 76 on the US Billboard 200 chart. |
| Dizzy Wright | State of Mind | Released: April 15, 2014; Peaked at number 54 on the US Billboard 200 chart. |
| Jarren Benton | Slow Motion, Vol. 1 | Released: January 27, 2015 |
| DJ Hoppa | Hoppa and Friends | Released: March 31, 2015 |
| Dizzy Wright | The Growing Process | Released: May 26, 2015 |
| Kato | Pathomania EP | Released: June 5, 2015 |
| Hopsin | Pound Syndrome | Released: July 24, 2015; Peaked at number 17 on the US Billboard 200 chart. |
