= Frank Dukes discography =

The following is a partial production discography of Adam "Frank Dukes" Feeney. Since 2022, he has released his own music under the moniker Ging. Active since the early 2000s, Dukes has produced hip hop, pop, jazz, and soul tracks for both independent and major artists and has most often produced for artists Camila Cabello, Post Malone, Drake, Travis Scott, and The Weeknd, having produced more than ten tracks for each of them. During the first half of the 2010s, he produced more than two dozen tracks for members of Wu-Tang Clan and for BADBADNOTGOOD.

An asterisk (*) denotes a track released as a commercial single.

== Original music as Ging ==
=== Albums ===
- We're Here, My Dear (2022)

=== Singles ===
Title	Year	Album
"Can You See Me"	2022	We're Here, My Dear
"Dear Boy"	2022	We're Here, My Dear
"Miracles" (The Jackson Sisters cover)	2022	We're Here, My Dear
"Never Want to Leave"	2022	We're Here, My Dear

== Original music as Frank Dukes ==
=== Beat tapes ===
Title	Details
The Way of Ging	Released: November 16, 2021; Label: self-released; Format: cassette, digital, NFT

=== Kingsway Music Library ===
As creator of the Kingsway Music sample library, Dukes has curated over 40 volumes of music.

Since 2013, he has composed the following volumes of original music (credits adapted from The Drum Broker),

- Kingsway Music Library, Vol. 1 (2013)
- Kingsway Music Library, Vol. 2 (2013)
- Kingsway Music Library, Vol. 3 (2014)
- Kingsway Music Library, Vol. 4 (2014)
- Kingsway Music Library, Vol. 5 (2015)
- Kingsway Music Library, Vol. 6 (2015)
- Kingsway Music Library, Vol. 7 (2015)
- Kingsway Music Library – Colors (2017) (released as LP)
- Kingsway Music Library, Vol. 8 (2018)
- Kingsway Music Library, Frank Dukes X Allen Ritter (2018)
- Kingsway Music Library, Vol. 9 (2018)
- Kingsway Music Library, Vol. 10 (2019)
- Kingsway Music Library – Parkscapes (2019)
- Kingsway Music Library, Frank Dukes Archive Vol. 1 & Vol. 2 (2021)

== Albums produced ==
Title	Details	Peak chart positions								
Title	Details	US	CAN	AUS	UK	GER	NZ	US R&B/HH	US Jazz	US Dance
III (BADBADNOTGOOD)	Released: May 6, 2014; Label: Innovative Leisure, Pirates Blend, Arts & Crafts; Format: LP, CD, cassette, digital	—	–	—	—	—	—	—	2	10
Sour Soul (BADBADNOTGOOD & Ghostface Killah)	Released: February 24, 2015; Label: Lex Records; Format: LP, CD, cassette, digital	109	–	54	–	–	–	9	–	–
Camila (Camila Cabello)	Released: January 12, 2018; Label: Epic, Syco; Format: CD, LP, digital	1	1	3	2	8	3	–	–	–
My Dear Melancholy (The Weeknd)	Released: March 30, 2018; Label: XO, Republic; Format: CD, LP, digital	1	1	3	3	7	2	1	–	–
Déjàvu (Matty fka. Matthew Tavares of BADBADNOTGOOD)	Released: June 15, 2018; Label: Matty Unlimited, Mr Bongo; Format: CD, LP, digital	–	–	–	–	–	–	–	–	–
Lover (Taylor Swift)	Released: August 23, 2019; Label: Republic; Format: CD, LP, digital, streaming	1	1	1	1	2	1	–	–	–
Casual Encounter EP (Doug Shorts)	Released: August 23, 2019; Label: Daptone Records; Format: digital; Produced with Homer Steinweiss in 2012	–	–	–	–	–	–	–	–	–
When Smoke Rises (Mustafa)	Released: May 28, 2021; Label: Regent Park Songs; Format: CD, LP, digital	–	–	–	–	–	–	–	–	–

== Charting singles ==
Title	Year	Peak chart positions							Certifications (RIAA/BPI/MC)	Album
Title	Year	AUS	CAN	FRA	IRL	UK	US	US R&B/HH	Certifications (RIAA/BPI/MC)	Album
"Hold On" (50 Cent)	2014	—	—	–	—	199	—	47		Animal Ambition
"0 to 100 / The Catch Up" (Drake)	2014	–	59	–	–	68	35	8	RIAA: 2× Platinum; BPI: Silver	non-album single
"Planez" (Jeremih feat. J. Cole)	2015	–	–	–	–	–	44	15	RIAA: 3× Platinum; BPI: Silver	Late Nights
"Charged Up" (Drake)	2015	–	75	–	–	–	78	18		non-album singles
"Right Hand" (Drake)	2015	–	72	–	–	81	58	15	RIAA: Platinum; BPI: SIlver	non-album singles
"9 Shots" (50 Cent)	2015	–	–	–	–	–	–	48		non-album singles
"Needed Me" (Rihanna)	2016	44	25	94	58	38	7	1	RIAA: 5× Platinum; BPI: Platinum; MC: 3× Platinum	Anti
"Trust Nobody" (Cashmere Cat feat. Selena Gomez & Tory Lanez)	2016	46	61	174	69	92	–	–	RIAA: Gold	9
"Untitled 07 | 2014 -2016" (Kendrick Lamar)	2016	–	–	–	–	93	90	27		Untitled Unmastered
"Pop Style" (Drake)	2016	44	19	29	58	33	16	4	RIAA: 3× Platinum; BPI: Silver	non-album single
"Pick Up the Phone" (Young Thug & Travis Scott)	2016	–	62	95	–	181	43	12	RIAA: 2× Platinum; BPI: Silver	Jeffery & Birds in the Trap Sing McKnight
"Deja Vu" (Post Malone feat. Justin Bieber)	2016	–	43	151	–	63	75	25	RIAA: Platinum; BPI: Silver; MC: 2× Platinum	Stoney
"Congratulations" (Post Malone)	2016	30	14	110	35	26	8	5	RIAA: Diamond; BPI: 2× Platinum; MC: 5× Platinum	Stoney
"Fake Love" (Drake)	2016	16	10	79	18	10	8	4	RIAA: 4× Platinum; BPI: Platinum	More Life
"Sex With Me" (Rihanna)	2017	–	–	52	–	130	83	8	RIAA: 2× Platinum; BPI: Gold	Anti (Deluxe)
"Run Up" (Major Lazer feat PartyNextDoor & Nicki Minaj)	2017	27	20	12	25	20	66	26	BPI: Gold	Major Lazer Essentials
"Regret in Your Tears" (Nicki Minaj)	2017	14	84	87	–	69	61	29		non-album singles
"Chanel" (Frank Ocean)	2017	–	72	–	–	80	72	30	RIAA: Platinum; BPI: Silver	non-album singles
"Still Got Time" (Zayn feat. PartyNextDoor)	2017	20	22	36	30	24	66	–	RIAA: Gold; BPI: Gold; MC: Platinum	non-album singles
"Green Light" (Lorde)	2017	4	9	24	17	20	19	–	RIAA: Platinum; BPI: Platinum; MC: 2× Platinum	Melodrama
"Perfect Places" (Lorde)	2017	44	76	–	91	95	–	–	RIAA: Gold; MC: Gold	Melodrama
"Homemade Dynamite" (Remix) (Lorde feat. Khalid, Post Malone and SZA)	2017	23	54	–	61	82	92	–	RIAA: Platinum; MC: Platinum	Melodrama
"Broken Clocks" (SZA)	2017	–	–	–	–	–	82	39	RIAA: Platinum	Ctrl
"Imitadora" (Romeo Santos)	2017	–	–	–	–	–	91	–	RIAA: 7× Platinum (Latin)	Golden
"Damage" (PartyNextDoor feat. Halsey)	2017	–	81	–	–	–	–	–		Seven Days
"Havana" (Camila Cabello)	2017	1	1	1	1	1	1	–	RIAA: 9× Platinum; BPI: 3× Platinum; MC: 9× Platinum	Camila
"Never Be the Same" (Camila Cabello)	2017	7	19	56	6	7	6	–	RIAA: 3× Platinum; BPI: Platinum; MC: 3× Platinum	Camila
"Pray for Me" (Kendrick Lamar & The Weeknd)	2018	9	5	14	12	11	7	4	RIAA: 2× Platinum; BPI: Gold; MC: 3× Platinum	Black Panther: The Album
"Wake Up" (Travis Scott)	2018	67	27	96	–	–	30	21	MC: Platinum	Astroworld
"Be Careful" (Cardi B)	2018	65	24	154	25	24	11	8	RIAA: 3× Platinum; BPI: Silver; MC: Gold	Invasion of Privacy
"Call Out My Name" (The Weeknd)	2018	3	1	22	5	7	4	3	RIAA: 3× Platinum; BPI: Gold; MC: 2× Platinum	My Dear Melancholy
"Better Now" (Post Malone)	2018	2	3	53	4	6	3	2	RIAA: 4× Platinum; BPI: 2× Platinum; MC: 8× Platinum	Beerbongs & Bentleys
"Splashin" (Rich the Kid)	2018	–	59	–	–	–	80	32	RIAA: Platinum	The World Is Yours 2
"Wow" (Post Malone)	2018	2	3	75	2	3	2	1	RIAA: Platinum; BPI: 2× Platinum; MC: 7× Platinum	Hollywood's Bleeding
"Circles" (Post Malone)	2019	2	2	77	2	3	1	–	RIAA: 4× Platinum; BPI: Platinum; MC: 8× Platinum	Hollywood's Bleeding
"Sucker" (Jonas Brothers)	2019	1	1	40	2	4	1	–	RIAA: 3× Platinum; BPI: Platinum; MC: 5× Platinum	Happiness Begins
"Fast" (Juice Wrld)	2019	62	39	–	33	41	47	22	RIAA: Gold	Death Race for Love
"Con Altura" (Rosalía, J Balvin & El Guincho)	2019	–	–	76	–	–	–	–	RIAA: Gold	non-album singles
"Yo x Ti, Tu x Mi" (Rosalía & Ozuna)	2019	–	–	189	–	–	–	–		non-album singles
"Cry for Me" (Camila Cabello)	2019	–	81	43	57	85	–	–		Romance
"Easy" (Camila Cabello)	2019	76	82	11	67	86	–	–		Romance
"My Oh My" (Camila Cabello feat. DaBaby)	2020	19	13	142	6	13	12	–	RIAA: 2× Platinum; BPI: Gold	Romance
"Over Now" (Calvin Harris & The Weeknd)	2020	17	22	124	26	33	38	–		non-album single
"Monster" (Shawn Mendes & Justin Bieber)	2020	7	1	75	10	9	8	1	MC: Gold	Wonder
"La Fama" (Rosalía feat. The Weekend)	2021	–	–	9	–	–	94	–		Motomami

== Other charted songs ==
Title	Year	Peak chart positions						Certifications (RIAA/BPI/MC)	Album
Title	Year	AUS	CAN	UK	US	US R&B/HH	US Rap	Certifications (RIAA/BPI/MC)	Album
"Rich Sex" (Future)	2015	—	—	–	100	32	—	RIAA: Gold	DS2
"Diamonds Dancing" (Drake & Future)	2015	–	79	194	53	18	15	RIAA: Platinum	What a Time to Be Alive
"10 Bands" (Drake)	2015	–	–	92	58	19	11	RIAA: Platinum	If You're Reading This It's Too Late
"No Tellin'" (Drake)	2015	–	–	119	81	26	21		If You're Reading This It's Too Late
"6PM In New York" (Drake)	2015	–	–	192	–	44	–		If You're Reading This It's Too Late
"Real Friends" (Kanye West)	2016	–	–	78	92	34	–	RIAA: Platinum; BPI: Silver	The Life of Pablo
"Attention" (The Weeknd)	2016	–	43	78	67	35	–	MC: Gold	Starboy
"Immortal" (J. Cole)	2016	57	12	49	11	6	–	RIAA: Platinum	4 Your Eyez Only
"Madiba Riddim" (Drake)	2017	–	23	31	51	29	–	BPI: Silver	More Life
"Blem" (Drake)	2017	–	8	10	38	20	–	RIAA: Platinum; BPI: Gold	More Life
"Homemade Dynamite" (Lorde)	2017	–	–	82	–	–	–		Melodrama
"Motorcycle Patches" (Huncho Jack)	2017	–	71	–	90	39	–		Huncho Jack, Jack Huncho
"Spoil My Night" (Post Malone feat. Swae Lee)	2018	19	12	–	15	10	–	RIAA: Platinum; BPI: Silver; MC: Platinum	Beerbongs & Bentleys
"Rich & Sad" (Post Malone)	2018	21	13	–	14	9	–	RIAA: Platinum; BPI: Silver; MC: Platinum	Beerbongs & Bentleys
"She Loves Control" (Camila Cabello)	2018	–	77	–	–	–	–		Camila
"Into It" (Camila Cabello)	2018	–	75	–	–	–	–		Camila
"Try Me" (The Weeknd)	2018	24	7	17	26	16	–	MC: Gold	My Dear Melancholy
"Wasted Times" (The Weeknd)	2018	23	8	18	27	17	–	RIAA: Platinum; MC: Platinum	My Dear Melancholy
"I Was Never There" (The Weeknd with Gesaffelstein)	2018	40	12	–	–	35	–	MC: Gold	My Dear Melancholy
"Privilege" (The Weeknd)	2018	45	22	–	–	52	–	MC: Gold	My Dear Melancholy
"Astrothunder" (Travis Scott)	2018	–	43	–	48	28	–	MC: Gold	Astroworld
"Who? What?" (Travis Scott feat. Quavo and Takeoff)	2018	–	41	–	43	26	–	MC: Gold	Astroworld
"Make It Back" (Juice Wrld)	2018	–	–	–	92	47	–		Wrld on Drugs
"Celebrate" (DJ Khaled feat. Travis Scott & Post Malone)	2019	–	37	–	52	23	19		Father of Ashad
"4PM in Calabasas" (Drake)	2019	–	80	72	–	45	–		Care Package
"I Forgot That You Existed" (Taylor Swift)	2019	24	29	–	28	–	–		Lover
"Afterglow" (Taylor Swift)	2019	57	72	–	75	–	–		Lover
"It's Nice to Have a Friend" (Taylor Swift)	2019	72	97	–	92	–	–		Lover
"Saint-Tropez" (Post Malone)	2019	19	10	52	18	10	8	BPI: Silver; MC: Platinum	Hollywood's Bleeding
A Thousand Bad Times" (Post Malone)	2019	39	29	–	29	–	–	MC: Gold	Hollywood's Bleeding
"Staring at the Sun" (Post Malone feat.SZA)	2019	48	38	–	34	–	–	MC: Gold	Hollywood's Bleeding
"Myself" (Post Malone)	2019	71	47	–	52	–	–		Hollywood's Bleeding
"Get Me" (promotional single) (Justin Bieber feat. Kehlani)	2020	61	48	61	93	–	–		Changes
"Alone Again" (The Weeknd)	2020	–	28	–	21	10	–		After Hours
"Cardigan" (Don Toliver)	2020	–	–	–	90	–	–	RIAA: Gold	Heaven or Hell
"Let Go My Hand" (J. Cole with Bas and 6lack)	2021	27	23	–	19	13	11		The Off-Season

== 2000s ==
This list is incomplete.

Bless – The Book of Bless (2005)

- 05. "Somethin' Missing"

Custom Made – Street Cinema Vol. 3: The Blackboard Jungle (2006)

- 11. M.I.Aneek*

Radio B – The Difference (2006)

- 08. "Interlude #1"
- 13. "Interlude #2"
- 17. "Outro"

Various artists – Hype Sessions Vol. 12 (2006)

- 02. Rap 101 (performed by Tumi and the Volume)

Drake – Room for Improvement (2006)

- 05. "Money" (Remix) (featuring Nickelus F)

Joell Ortiz – The Brick: Bodega Chronicles (2007)

- 05. "125 Part 2 (Fresh Air)"
- 08. "125 Part 3 (Connections)" (featuring Ras Kass, Sha Stimuli, Grafh & Gab Gacha)
- 15. "125 Part 4 (Finale)"

Nickelus F – How to Build Buzz for Dummies (2007)

- 08. Wrong Doing (feat. Loaded Lux)

Rugged Intellect – Renaissance Music: The Introduction (2007)

- 02. "What It Is"

Kool G Rapp – Half a Klip (2008)

- 05. "Typical Nigga"

50 Cent – War Angel LP (2009)

- 02. "Talking in Codes"

50 Cent – Forever King (2009)

- 02. "Respect It or Check It"

50 Cent – "Tia Told Me" single (2009)

- 00. "Tia Told Me"

Elzhi – The Leftovers (Unmixedtape) (2009)

- 02. "Deep" (additional production)

Joell Ortiz – various singles (2009)

- 00. "We Can Do It" (feat. Styles P)
- 00. "Line Em Up" (feat. Cory Gunz)

Masta Ace & Edo G – Arts and Entertainment (2009)

- 15. "Ei8ht is Enuff" (featuring Ed O.G.)

Ro Spit –The Oh S#!t Project (2009)

- 16. "Arts & Crafts" (feat. Fes Roc & Illite)

== 2010 ==
AZ – Doe Or Die 15th Anniversary

- 02. "Feel My Pain"

Danny Brown – The Hybrid

- 08. "Shootin Moves"

Ghostface Killah – Apollo Kids

- 01. "Purified Thoughts" (featuring Killah Priest & GZA)
- 03. "Black Tequila" (featuring Cappadonna & Trife Diesel)
- 07. "In Tha Park" (featuring Black Thought)

Joell Ortiz – Farewell Summer EP

- 01. "Intro"
- 05. "So Wrong"

Jojo Pellegrino – various singles

- 00. "Triple Homicide" feat. Sean Price & Inspectah Deck (2010)
- 00. "Devastate" (2010)

Oktober Zero – The Devil Smokes Dimebags

- 14. “Spoke To Da O.G.”

Lloyd Banks – H.F.M. The Hunger For More 2

- 13. "Sooner Or Later (Die 1 Day)" (featuring Raekwon)
- 00. "Reach Out" (released as part of Blue Fridays series)

REKS – In Between the Lines, Volume 2.

- 17. "Getting Ugly"

Remedy – It All Comes Down To This

- 15. "All A Dream"

== 2011 ==
AWAR – Thing Of That Nature EP / Nature of the Beast

- 01–02. "My Story" (feat. Mic King)
- 02–09. "I Don't Care"

D-Black – Mr. October Returns

- 11. "Don't Love Me"

Danny Brown – XXX

- 01. "XXX"
- 13. "DNA"

Eloquor – Human Condition (2011)

- 06. "Mr Personality"

J. Pinder – Code Red 2.0

- 13. "Upside Down 2.0"*

Joell Ortiz – Free Agent

- 01. "Intro"
- 13. "Checkin For You" (performed by Sebastian Rios)

Jojo Pellegrino – various singles

- 00. "Real Spit" (2011)
- 00. Capitano Flow (2011)

Joyner Lucas (as Future Joyner) – Listen to Me

- 07. "One"

LEP Bogus Boys – Now or Neva

- 15. "Closer" (featuring Dion Primo)
- 18. "Outro"

LEP Bogus Boys & Mobb Deep – "Gangstaz Only" single

- 00. "Gangstaz Only"

Tony Yayo – Gunpower Guru 3

- "Based" (feat. Lil B)

Various artists – The New North

- 06. "Flawless" (performed by Shad)

Various artists – Newermind (SPIN Tribute to Nirvana's Nevermind)

- 10. "Stay Away" (performed by Charles Bradley & the Menahan Street Band) (later included on 2018's Black Velvet)

Willie the Kid – The Cure 2

- 07. "Fucking In a Foreign Car / Interlude Two"

== 2012 ==
Derek Minor – PSA Vol. 3: Who is Derek Minor? (2012)

- 11. "Get Up"

Kid Ink & Kirko Bangz – "Take It Down" single

- 00. "Take It Down" (sample producer; uncredited)

Ryan Leslie – Les Is More

- 12. "The Black Flag"

The Rhyme Animal (SARS Network) – TRA - Blunt Trauma

- 01. "Intro"
- 06. "No Smiling"

Various artists – The Man with the Iron Fists

- 05. "Get Your Way (Sex Is a Weapon)" (performed by Idle Warship)
- 06. "Rivers of Blood" (performed by Wu-Tang Clan and Kool G Rap)
- 07. "Built for This" (performed by Method Man, Freddie Gibbs and Streetlife)*
- 08. "The Archer" (performed by Killa Sin)
- 11. "Tick, Tock" (performed by Pusha T, Raekwon, Joell Ortiz and Danny Brown)*
- 12. "Green Is The Mountain" (performed by Frances Yip)
- 13. "Six Directions of Boxing" (performed by Wu-Tang Clan)
- 16. "Bust Shots (Bonus)" (performed by Sheek Louch, Ghostface Killah & Inspectah Deck)

Wu Block (Ghostface Killah & Sheek Louch) – Wu Block

- 09. "Different Time Zones" (featuring Inspectah Deck)

== 2013 ==
AZ – L.O.D.B II (Last of a Dying Breed)

- 23. "Feel Me Pain"

Cashius Green – Right Now

- 03. "Get Yo Change"

Charles Bradley – Victim of Love

- 01. "Strictly Reserved for You" (featuring Menahan Street Band)* (songwriter credit only)
- 08. "Where Do We Go from Here" (featuring Menahan Street Band) (songwriter credit only)

Danny Brown – Old

- 19. "Float On" (featuring Charli XCX)

Eminem – The Marshall Mathers LP 2

- 19. "Groundhog Day"

Ghetts – Chain Smoking

- 03. "Eyes So Low"

OBX – "Mustard" single

- 00. "Mustard"

Speaker Knockerz – Finesse Father

- "How Could U" (music by credit)

Tinashe – Black Water

- 10. "Stunt" (sample producer)

Tree – Sunday School II: When Church Lets Out

- 07. "Busters"

Wu-Tang Clan – Execution in Autumn" single

- 01. "Execution in Autumn"*

== 2014 ==
50 Cent – Animal Ambition

- 01. "Hold On"*

Army Of The Pharaohs – Heavy Lies The Crown

- 01. "War Machine"

BadBadNotGood – III

Album executive producer

- 01. "Triangle"
- 02. "Can't Leave The Night"*
- 03. "Confessions" (featuring Leland Whitty)
- 04. "Kaleidoscope"
- 05. "Eyes Closed"
- 06. "Hedron"*
- 07. "Differently, Still"
- 08. "Since You Asked Kindly"
- 09. "CS60"*
- 10. "Sustain"*

Drake – "0 to 100 / The Catch Up" single

- 01. "0 to 100 / The Catch Up"*

Fabolous – The Young OG Project

- 08. "Bish Bounce"

Jeezy – Seen It All: The Autobiography

- 04. "Holy Ghost" (sample producer)

Logic – Under Pressure

- 07. "Growing Pains III" (sample producer)
- 08. "Never Enough" (sample producer)

Schoolboy Q – Oxymoron (Deluxe)

- 14. "Grooveline Pt. 2" (featuring Suga Free) (co-producer credit)

Smoke DZA – Dream. ZONE. Achieve (2014)

- 09. "Hearses" (feat. Ab-Soul) (sample producer; uncredited)

Wu Block (Ghostface Killah & Sheek Louch) – Hidden Gems

- 09. South Beach

Yuna – "Broke Her" single (2014)

- 00. "Broke Her" (sample producer; uncredited)

== 2015 ==
50 Cent – "9 Shots" single

- 00. "9 Shots"*

50 Cent – The Kanan Tape

- 07. "On Everything" (sample producer; uncredited)

BADBADNOTGOOD & Ghostface Killah – Sour Soul

Album executive producer

- 01. "Mono"
- 02. "Soul Soul"
- 03. "Six Degrees" (featuring Danny Brown)*
- 04. "Gunshowers" (featuring Elzhi)*
- 05. "Stark's Reality"
- 06. "Tone's Rap"*
- 07. "Mind Playing Tricks"
- 08. "Street Knowledge" (featuring TREE)
- 09. "Ray Gun" (featuring MF Doom)*
- 10. "Nuggets of Wisdom"
- 11. "Food"
- 12. "Experience"

Big Sean – "What a Year" single

- 00. "What a Year" single

Curren$y – Pilot Talk III

- 07. "The 560 SL" (featuring Wiz Khalifa)

Curren$y – Stoned on Ocean EP

- 03. "Game Tapes" (sample producer; uncredited)

Drake – If You're Reading This It's Too Late

- 03. "10 Bands" (songwriting credit only)
- 05. "No Tellin'" (co-producer credit)
- 17. "6PM In New York" (Bonus Track) (co-producer credit)

Drake – various singles

- 00. "Charged Up"
- 00. "Right Hand"

Drake & Future – What a Time To Be Alive

- 04. "Diamonds Dancing" (sample producer)

Drake & Tinashe – "On a Wave" single

- 00. "On a Wave" (sample producer)

Freddie Gibbs – Shadow of a Doubt

- 04. "Fuckin' Up the Count"
- 13. "Insecurities" (uncredited)

Future – DS2

- 12. "Rich Sex"
- 00. "Hate in Your Soul" demo (sample producer; uncredited)

G-Unit – The Beast Is G Unit

- 06. "Choose One" (songwriter credit only)

Gucci Mane – Droptopwop

- 06. "Finesse the Plug Interlude" (uncredited)

Jamie Foxx – Hollywood: A Story of a Dozen Roses

- 04. "Another Dose"

Jeremih – Late Nights

- 01. "Planez" (featuring J. Cole)* (co-producer credit; sample producer)

Joe Budden – All Love Lost (Deluxe)

- 13. "Fuck Em All" (uncredited)

Joell Ortiz & !llmind – Human.

- 08. "Latino Pt. II" (sample producer)

Joyner Lucas – Along Came Joyner

- 17. "Ross Capicchioni"* (sample producer; uncredited)

Logic – "Top Ten" (feat. Big K.R.I.T.) single

- 00. "Top Ten" (feat. Big K.R.I.T.) (sample producer; uncredited)

Ludacris – Ludaversal

- 04. "Lyrical Healing"
- 13. "Charge It to the Rap Game" (songwriting credit only)

Lupe Fiasco – Tetsuo & Youth

- "Chopper" (featuring Billy Blue, Buk of Psychodrama, Trouble, Trae tha Truth, Fam-Lay and Glasses Malone) (songwriting credit only)

Mac Miller – GO:OD AM

- 08. "Clubhouse" (songwriting credit only)
- 11. "Perfect Circle / God Speed"
- 13. "ROS" (songwriting credit only)

Pusha T – King Push – Darkest Before The Dawn

- 03. "M.F.T.R." (featuring The-Dream)*

Selena Gomez – Revival (Deluxe)

- 15. "Outta My Hands (Loco)" (additional producer credit)

Travis Scott – Rodeo

- 02. "Oh My Dis Side" (featuring Quavo)
- 04. "Wasted" (featuring Juicy J) (additional producer credit)
- 06. "Pray 4 Love" (featuring The Weeknd) (songwriting credit only)
- 11. "Maria I'm Drunk" (featuring Justin Bieber & Young Thug)

Travis Scott – "Nothing But Net" single

- 01. "Nothing But Net" (featuring PartyNextDoor & Young Thug)

Various artists – Southpaw (Music From And Inspired By The Motion Picture)

- 10. "Drama Never Ends " (performed by 50 Cent)

Wale – The Album About Nothing

- 02. "The Helium Balloon" (additional producer credit; sample producer)

== 2016 ==
2 Chainz – ColleGrove

- 08. "Bentley Truck" (featuring Lil Wayne)

6lack – Free 6lack

- 01. "Never Know" (uncredited producer)

Ace Hood – Starvation 5

- 06. "Go Mode" (featuring Rick Ross)

Bishop Nehru – Magic:19

- 02. "It's Whateva" (sample producer; uncredited)

DJ Khaled – Major Key

- 10. "Work For It" (featuring Big Sean, Gucci Mane & 2 Chainz)

Drake – Views

- 15. "Pop Style"* (sample producer)

Common – Black America Again

- 11. "A Bigger Picture Called Free" (featuring Syd & Bilal) (songwriter credit only; sample production)
- 14. "Little Chicago Boy" (featuring Tasha Cobbs) (songwriter credit only; sample production)

Cousin Stizz – Monda

- 11. "Big Fella" (sample producer; uncredited)

Cuz Lightyear – What Up Cuz

- 04. "Recognize" (songwriter credit only)

Domo Genesis – Genesis

- "Awkward Groove" (songwriter credit only; sample producer)

Dvsn – Sept. 5th

- 01. "With Me" (songwriter credit only)

Ella Mai – Change EP

- 04. "Lay Up"* (sample producer; uncredited)

Fetty Wap – "Different Now" single

- 01. "Different Now"*

Frank Ocean – Endless

- 05. "U-N-I-T-Y" (songwriter credit only)

Genetikk – Fuck Genetikk

- 07. "Mata Cobra"
- 15. "Saint Laurant"

J. Cole – 4 Your Eyez Only

- 02. "Immortal" (sample production)

James Vincent McMorrow – We Move

- 02. "I Lie Awake Every Night"

Jarren Benton – Slow Motion Vol. 2

- 04. "No F*cks to Give" (feat. Futuristic & Chris Webby) (sample producer; uncredited)

Kanye West – The Life of Pablo

- 12. "Real Friends" (co-producer credit; sample production)

Kendrick Lamar – Untitled Unmastered

- 07. "Untitled 07 | 2014 -2016"*

Kevin Hart – Kevin Hart: What Now?

- 15. "What Now" (feat. BJ the Chicago Kid, Wale, and Chaz French) (sample producer; uncredited)

Lance Skiiiwalker – Introverted Intuition

- 08. "Skit / Her Song"

Logic – Bobby Tarantino

- 10. "Slave" (sample producer; uncredited)

Mac Miller – The Divine Feminine

- 03. "Stay" (songwriter credit only)
- 08. "We" (featuring CeeLo Green)*
- 07. "Planet God Damn" (featuring Njomza)

Macklemore & Ryan Lewis – This Unruly Mess I've Made

- 01. "Light Tunnels" (featuring Mike Slap) (music credit only)

Nekfeu – Cyborg

- 06. "Esquimaux" (feat Népal) (sample producer; uncredited)
- 07. "O.D." (feat. Murkage Dave) (sample producer; uncredited)

Nipsey Hussle – Slauson Boy 2

- 05. "Full Time" (feat. Mitchy Slick) (sample producer; uncredited)

Post Malone – Stoney

- 03. "Deja Vu" (featuring Justin Bieber)*
- 05. "Cold"
- 12. "Congratulations" (featuring Quavo)*

Pusha T – "Circles" single

- 01. "Circles" (featuring Desiigner & Ty Dolla Sign)*

Rihanna – Anti (Deluxe)

- 07. "Needed Me"* (co-producer credit; sample production)
- 16. "Sex With Me"* (co-producer credit; sample production)

River Tiber – Indigo

- 05. "West" (featuring Daniel Caesar) (songwriting credit only)

Ronny J – OMGRONNY

- 03. "824" (songwriting credit only)

Schoolboy Q – Blank Face LP

- 16. "Overtime" (featuring Miguel & Justine Skye)*

Snoh Aalegra – Don't Explain

- 03. "Charleville 9200"

Taylor Gang – TGOD Volume 1

- 19. "Trap Phone" (performed by Wiz Khalifa, Chevy Woods, Blunt Smoker)

The Game – 1992

- 05. "The Juice" (sample producer; uncredited)

The Weeknd – Starboy

- 13. "Attention"

Tory Lanez – I Told You

- 06. "Friends With Benefits" (sample production)

Travis Scott – Birds in the Trap Sing McKnight

- 11. "Pick Up The Phone" (featuring Young Thug & Quavo)*
- 12. "Lose"
- 00. "Ooo Nana" (feat. Young Thug) demo (sample producer; uncredited)

Ty Dolla Sign – Campaign

- 08. "Zaddy"*

Usher – Hard II Love

- 08. "Make U a Believer"

Westside Boogie – Thirst 48 Pt. II

- 11. "Slide on You" (songwriting credit only)

Young Thug – Jeffery

- 10. "Pick Up the Phone" (with Travis Scott featuring Quavo)*

== 2017 ==
Amine – Good For You

- 02. "Yellow" (featuring Nelly)
- 05. "Spice Girl"*
- 07. "Wedding Crashers" (featuring Offset)*
- 08. "Sundays"
- 14. "Beach Boy"

ASAP MOB – Cozy Tapes Vol. 2: Too Cozy

- 11. "Frat Rules" (performed by ASAP Rocky, Playboi Carti and Big Sean) (sample producer; uncredited)
- 13. "Feels So Good" (performed by ASAP Rocky, ASAP Ferg, ASAP Nast, ASAP Twelvyy and ASAP Ant) (sample producer)

Bebe Rexha – All Your Fault: Pt. 2

- 05. "Comfortable" (featuring Kranium)

Belly – Mumble Rap

- 08. "Alcantara" (featuring Pusha T)

Big K.R.I.T. – 4eva Is a Mighty Long Time

- 02–06. "Higher Calling" (featuring Jill Scott) (sample producer; songwriter credit only)

Bryson Tiller – True to Self

- 09. "Always (Outro)" (songwriter credit only)

Cashmere Cat – 9

- 08. "Trust Nobody" (featuring Selena Gomez & Tory Lanez)* (songwriter credit only)

Chris Brown – Heartbreak on a Full Moon

- 2-05. "Tough Love"

Cousin Stizz – One Night Only

- 11. "Jo Bros"

Denzel Curry – Imperial

- 05. "Me Now"

Drake – More Life

- 06. "Madiba Riddim"
- 07. "Blem" (additional music contribution credit)
- 20. "Fake Love"*

Fabolous & Trey Songz – Trappy New Years

- 04. "Pick Up The Phone"

Frank Ocean – various singles

- 00. "Chanel"*
- 00. "Biking" (featuring Jay-Z & Tyler, The Creator)*
- 00. "Lens"

French Montana – Jungle Rules

- 06. "Hotel Bathroom"

G-Dragon – Kwon Ji Yong

- 05. "Divina Commedia"

G-Eazy & Carnage – Step Brothers EP

- 02. "Gimme Gimme"

Huncho Jack – Huncho Jack, Jack Huncho

- 04. "Motorcycle Patches"

Jahkoy – Foreign Water

- 06. "Selfish" (co-producer credit)

Jeezy – Pressure

- 10. "Like Them" (featuring Tory Lanez and Rick Ross) (co-producer credit)
- 11. "The Life" (featuring Wizkid and Trey Songz) (co-producer credit)

Jhené Aiko – Trip

- 11. "Never Call Me" (featuring Kurupt)
- 17. "Mystic Journey (Freestyle)" (songwriter credit only)

JID – The Never Story

- 07. "All Bad" (featuring Mereba) (sample producer; writing credit)

Jidenna – The Chief

- 01. "A Bull's Tale"
- 03. "Trampoline" (additional producer credit)
- 08. "The Let Out" (featuring Nana Kwabena)* (co-producer credit)
- 13. "White Niggas" (additional producer credit)

Joyner Lucas – 508-507-2209

- 05. "Lullaby"

Kodak Black – Project Baby 2

- 08. "Unexplainable"
- 12. "Built My Legacy" (uncredited)

Lido – Everything

- 07. "Citi Bike" (songwriting credit only)
- 11. "Tell Me How To Feel"

Lil Pump – Lil Pump

14. "Flex Like Ouu"* (co-producer credit)

Lorde – Melodrama

- 01. "Green Light"*
- 03. "Homemade Dynamite"*
- 04. "The Louvre" (additional producer credit)
- 06. "Hard Feelings/Loveless"
- 07. "Sober II (Melodrama)"
- 09. "Supercut" (additional producer credit)
- 11. "Perfect Places"*
- 12. "Homemade Dynamite (Remix) (featuring Khalid, Post Malone and SZA)" (Bonus Track)*
- 00. "Green Light (Chromeo Remix)"

Major Lazer – "Run Up" single

- "Run Up" (feat. PartyNextDoor & Nicki Minaj) (uncredited) (later included on 2018's Major Lazer Essentials)

Mod Sun – Movie

- 01. "Previews"
- 02. "We Do This Shit" (featuring Dej Loaf) (songwriter credit only)

NAV & Metro Boomin – Perfect Timing

- 10. "Call Me" (uncredited)

Nicki Minaj – "Regret in Your Tears" single

- 01. "Regret in Your Tears"*

PartyNextDoor – Seven Days

- 03. "Damage" (with Halsey)*

Phora – Yours Truly Forever

- 15. "In My Eyez" (songwriter credit only)

Romeo Santos – Golden

- 16. "Imitadora"*

Smokepurpp – Deadstar

- 08. "Fingers Blue" (featuring Travis Scott)

Starrah & Diplo – Starrah X Diplo EP

- 04. "Always Come Back" (songwriter credit only)

SZA – Ctrl

- 07. "Go Gina" (additional producer credit)
- 09. "Broken Clocks"* (sample producer; songwriter credit only)

Various artists – The Fate of the Furious: The Album

- 09. "911" (performed by Kevin Gates)

XXXTentacion – Members Only, Vol. 3

- 14. "777" (with Kid Trunks)

ZAYN – Icarus Falls

- 288. "Still Got Time" (featuring PartyNextDoor)*

Zoey Dollaz – M'ap Boule

- 04. "Oh Yeah Yeah" (songwriter credit only)

== 2018 ==
50 Cent – "Crazy" single

- 00. "Crazy" (feat. PnB Rock)

88rising – Head in the Clouds

- "Poolside Manor" (performed by Niki and August 8)

A. Chal – EXOTIGAZ

- 03. "DÉJALO"*

BIA – NICE GIRLS FINISH LAST: CUIDADO

- 01. "Supabien" (songwriting credit only)

Bobby Feeno – Flamingo & Koval

- 03. "I Still Love H.E.R."

Bobby Sessions – RVLTN (Chapter 1)

- 09. "RVLTN" (feat. Zyah) (songwriting credit only)

Camila Cabello – Camila

Album executive producer

- 01. "Never Be The Same"*
- 02. "All These Years"
- 03. "She Loves Control"
- 04. "Havana" (featuring Young Thug)*
- 05. "Inside Out"
- 07. "Real Friends"
- 08. "Something's Gotta Give"
- 09. "In The Dark"
- 10. "Into It"
- 11. "Never Be The Same" (Radio Edit)
- 12. "Havana" (remix) (with Daddy Yankee) (Bonus Track)
- 13. "I Have Questions" (Japan Bonus Track) (additional production credit)

Cardi B – Invasion of Privacy

- 05. "Be Careful"*

Charles Bradley – Black Velvet

- 09. "Stay Away" (Nirvana cover; originally released by SPIN in 2011)

Dave East – Karma 2

- 16. "Us" (feat. Gunna) (sample producer; uncredited)

David Guetta – 7

- 07. "I'm That Bitch" (feat. Saweetie) (uncredited)

DJ SKIZZ – High Powered

- 02. "Perfect Storm" (featuring Willie The Kid, Planet Asia, CRIMEAPPLE)

Future & Juice WRLD – WRLD ON DRUGS

- 05. "Make It Back" (performed by Juice Wrld) (co-producer credit)

Juicy J – ShutDaFukUp

- 05. "We Can't Smoke No Mo" (sample producer; uncredited)

Justine Skye – ULTRAVIOLET

- 02. "Goodlove"

Lupe Fiasco – Drogas Wave

- 03. "Manilla" (sample producer; uncredited)

Kodak Black – Heart Break Kodak

- 01. "Running Outta Love"

Kirk Knight – liwii

- 09. "Full Metal Jacket" (songwriter credit only)

Kris Wu – Antares

- 01. "Antares"
- 05. "We Alive"

Lil Baby & Gunna – Drip Harder

- 10. "Style Stealer" (performed by Gunna)

Logic – Bobby Tarantino II

- 07. "Midnight" (sample producer)

Masego – Lady Lady

- 03. "Lavish Lullaby" (songwriter credit only)

Matty – Déjàvu

Album executive producer

- 01. "Embarrassed"*
- 02. "Verocai"
- 03. "How Can He Be"
- 04. "I'll Gladly Place Myself Below You"*
- 05. "Clear"
- 06. "Polished"
- 07. "Nothing, Yet"
- 08. "Butter"
- 09. "Déjávu"
- 10. "Verocai Pt. II" (Bonus Track)

Meek Mill – Championships

- 19. "Cole Hearted II" (sample producer)

MØ – Forever Neverland

- 01. "Intro"
- 14. "Purple Like the Summer Rain"

Nicki Minaj – Queen

- 14. "2 Lit 2 Late Interlude"

District 21 – No Static

- 12. "Calabasas High"

Post Malone – Beerbongs & Bentleys

- 02. "Spoil My Night" (featuring Swae Lee)
- 03. "Rich & Sad"
- 09. "Better Now"*

Rae Sremmurd – SR3MM

- 3-07. "Keep God First" (performed by Slim Jxmmi) (sample producer)
- 3-09. "Growed Up" (performed by Slim Jxmmi) (sample producer)

Rich the Kid – The World Is Yours 2

- 03. "Splashin"* (sample producer)

Royce da 5'9" – Book of Ryan

- 19. "Stay Woke" (featuring Ashley Sorrell)

Ryan Beatty – Boy in Jeans

- 14. "Rhinestone"

Smokepurpp – "Big Bucks" single

- 00. "Big Bucks" (songwriter credit only)

The Neighbourhood – The Neighbourhood

- 03. "Nervous" (songwriter credit only)

The Weeknd – My Dear Melancholy

EP executive producer

- 01. "Call Out My Name"*
- 02. "Try Me"
- 03. "Wasted Times"
- 04. "I Was Never There" (featuring Gesaffelstein)
- 06. "Privilege"
- 07. "Call Out My Name – A Capella version" (Bonus Track)

Travis Scott – Astroworld

- 08. "Wake Up"*
- 11. "Astrothunder"
- 14. "Who? What?" (songwriter credit only; sample production)

Various artists – Black Panther: The Album

- 12. "Seasons" (performed by Mozzy featuring Sjava & Reason)
- 14. "Pray For Me" (performed by The Weeknd & Kendrick Lamar)*

Wiley – Godfather II

- 08. "Fashion Week" (sample producer; uncredited)

Wiz Khalifa – Rolling Papers II

- 07. "Rolling Papers II"

== 2019 ==
BEAM – 95

- 10. "Stranded"

Camila Cabello – Romance

- 03. "Should've Said It"
- 07. "Easy"*
- 08. "Feel It Twice"
- 10. "Cry for Me"*
- 14. "My Oh My" (featuring DaBaby) (Bonus Track)*

Chris Brown – Indigo

- 09. "Need a Stack" (featuring Lil Wayne and Joyner Lucas)

Curren$y – Back at Burnie's (2019)

- 02. "All Work" (feat. Young Dolph) (sample producer; uncredited)

DJ Khaled – Father of Ashad

- 06. "Celebrate" (featuring Travis Scott and Post Malone)

Doug Shorts – Casual Encounter EP

Album producer with Homer Steinweiss

- 01. Get With The Program
- 02. Casual Encounter
- 03. Heads or Tails
- 04. Money
- 05. Keep Your Head Up
- 06. This Feeling I Get

Drake – Care Package

- 07. "4PM in Calabasas"

Flipp Dinero – Love for Guala

- 13. "Till I'm Gone" (feat. Kodak Black)

Freddie Gibbs & Madlib – Bandana

- 03. "Half Manne Half Cocaine" (sample producer)

IDK – Is He Real

- 06. "Lilly" (sample producer)

Jaden – ERYS (Deluxe)

- 14. "Beautiful Disruption"

Jonas Brothers – Happiness Begins

- 01. "Sucker"* (co-producer credit)

Juice Wrld – Death Race for Love

- 05. "Fast"*

Julia Michaels –Inner Monologue Part 1 EP

- 02. "Into You"

Kevin Garrett – Hoax

- 01. "Warn" (songwriter credit only)

Lil' Kim – 9 (2019)

- 03. "Catch My Wave" (feat. Rich the Kid) (sample producer; uncredited)

Logic – Confessions of a Dangerous Mind

- 05. "Mama / Show Love" (featuring Cordae) (sample producer)

Melii – phAses

- 14. "Feel Me" (songwriter credit only)

MorMor – Some Place Else

- 02. "Outside"*

Pardison Fontaone – Underb8d

- 02. "Too Late" (feat. Jadakiss)

PnB Rock – TrapStar Turnt PopStar (Deluxe Edition)

- 03–04. "Take My Soul" (featuring YoungBoy Never Broke Again)

Post Malone – Hollywood's Bleeding

- 02. "Saint-Tropez"
- 05. "A Thousand Bad Times"
- 06. "Circles"*
- 11. "Staring at the Sun" (featuring SZA)
- 15. "Myself"
- 17. "Wow"*
- 00. "Wow." (Remix) (feat. Roddy Ricch & Tyga)
- 00. "Wow." (Instrumental)

Rayland Baxster – Good Mmornin

- 04. "We" (songwriter credit only)

Rich Brian – The Sailor

- 04. "Kids"*

Rosalía – "A Palé" single

- 01. "A Palé"

Rosalía, J Balvin, El Guincho – "Con Altura" single

- 01. "Con Altura"*

Rosalía & Ozuna – "Yo X Ti Tu X Mi" single

- 01. "Yo X Ti, Tu X Mi"*

Stormzy – Heavy is the Head

- 06. "Handsome"

Taylor Swift – Lover

- 01. "I Forgot That You Existed"
- 15. "Afterglow"
- 17. "It's Nice to Have a Friend"

Trippie Red – !

- 08. "Keep You Head Up"

WYNNE – If I May...

- 03. "Playa"

Young M.A. – Herstory in the Making

- 16. "Foreign"

Ramage - Al Anesa Farah - Music from the Original TV Series

- 01. "Ya Lil" (featuring Nicki Minaj)*

== 2020 ==
Anna Sofia – Self Aware Bitch

- 01. "Self Aware Bitch"

Calvin Harris & The Weeknd – "Over Now" single

- 00. "Over Now"*

Don Toliver – Heaven or Hell

- 03. "Cardigan"
- 08. "Company"
- 10. "Spaceship" (featuring Sheck Wes)

G-Eazy – The Beautiful & Damned (Deluxe Edition)

- 22. "Love You Like You Do" (feat. Rittybo & Jammy) (sample producer)

Gunna – Wunna

- "Skybox"* (songwriter credit only)

Justin Bieber – Changes

- 11. "Get Me" (feat. Kehlani)

Kaan Güneşberk – "The Realist" single

- 01. "The Realist"

Kodak Black – "Because of You" single

- 01. "Because of You"*

Logic – No Pressure

- 03. "GP4" (sample producer; credited as writer)

Mez – "Loading..." single

- 00. "Loading..." (2020)

PARTYNEXTDOOR – PARTYPACK EP

- 03. "Things & Such" (songwriter credit only)

Rosalía – various singles

- 00. "Dolerme"*
- 00. "Como Alí"*

Savannah Ré – Opia

- 05. "Love Me Back"

Shawn Mendes –Wonder

- 01. "Intro"
- 08. "Song for No One"
- 09. "Monster" (with Justin Bieber)*

$Not – - Tragedy +

- 07. "Mistake (Choppa Boy)"

Tierra Wack – "Dora" single

- 00. "Dora"*

The Weeknd – After Hours

- 01. "Alone Again"

Various artists – Road to Fast 9 Mixtape

- 03. "Clap" (performed by Don Toliver feat. Sheck Wes)

== 2021 ==
347aidan – "IDWK" single

- 01. "IDWK" (feat. Kenny Beats)*

Menahan Street Band – The Exciting Sounds Of The Menahan Street Band

- 11. "The Duke" (songwriting credit only)*

J. Cole – The Off-Season

- 08. "Let Go My Hand" (feat. Bas and 6lack)

Mustafa – When Smoke Rises

- 01. "Stay Alive"*
- 02. "Air Forces"*
- 03. "Separate"
- 04. "The Hearse"*
- 05. "Capo" (feat. Sampha) (music credit only)
- 06. "Ali"*
- 07. "What About Heaven"
- 08. "Come Back"

Logic – "Get Up" single

- 00. "Get Up"* (songwriting credit only)

Russ – "On The Way" single

- 00. "One the Way"* (songwriting credit only)

Dvsn & Ty Dolla Sign – Cheers to the Best Memories

- 09. "Better Yet (dvsn Interlude)"

Baby Keem – The Melodic Blue

- 01. "Trademark USA"

Shad – Tao

- 09. "Tao Pt 2"

James Blake – Friends That Break Your Heart

- 07. "Foot Forward"

Mac Miller – Faces (Re-Release)

- 25. "Yeah"

French Montana – They Got Amnesia

- 10. "Didn't Get Far" (feat. Fabolous) (songwriting credit only)

$not – Ethereal

- 13. "High IQ" (songwriting credit only)

== 2022 ==
Rosalía – Motomami

- 02. "Candy"
- 03. "La Fama" (with The Weeknd)*
- 10. "Diablo"
- 13. "Como un G"

Mnnyyz – "For The Low" single

- 00. "For The Low"

Koffee – Gifted

- 04. "Gifted"

Romeo Santos – Formula, Vol. 3

- 04. "Boomerang" (songwriting credit only)

Cilo – LOS

- 01. "Pray I Make It Home"
- 02. "Don't B Bitter / 101"

== 2023 ==
Taylor Swift – "All of the Girls You Loved Before" single

- 00. "All of the Girls You Loved Before"
