= Slow Motion =

Slow Motion may refer to:

== Film ==
- Slow motion, a filmmaking effect
- Slow Motion (1979 film), a Croatian film directed by Vanča Kljaković
- Slow Motion (1980 film) or Every Man for Himself, a film by Jean-Luc Godard

== Music ==
- Slow Motion (Hosokawa), a composition for accordion by Toshio Hosokawa, 2002

=== Albums ===
- Slow Motion (Man album), 1974
- Slow Motion (Supertramp album) or the title song, 2002
- Slomotion or the title song, by the Watchmen, 2001
- Slow Motion, an EP by Jarren Benton, 2015

=== Songs ===
- "Slow Motion" (Akina Nakamori song), 1982
- "Slow Motion" (Color Me Badd song), 1992
- "Slow Motion" (Juvenile song), 2004
- "Slow Motion" (Lee.M and J. Pearl song), 2012
- "Slow Motion" (Leila K song), 1993
- "Slow Motion" (Marshmello and Jonas Brothers song), 2025
- "Slow Motion" (Matt Champion and Jennie song), 2024
- "Slow Motion" (Trey Songz song), 2015
- "Slow Motion" (Ultravox song), 1978
- "Slo-Mo-Tion", by Marilyn Manson, 2012
- "Slow Motion", by !!! from Wallop, 2019
- "Slow Motion", by Big & Rich from Comin' to Your City, 2005
- "Slow Motion", by Blondie from Eat to the Beat, 1979
- "Slow Motion", by David Gray from Life in Slow Motion, 2005
- "Slow Motion", by Don Toliver from Love Sick, 2023
- "Slow Motion", by Gerald Alston, 1990
- "Slow Motion", by Juliana Hatfield from Beautiful Creature, 2000
- "Slow Motion", by KSI and Randolph from New Age, 2018
- "Slow Motion", by Kylie Minogue from Body Language, 2003
- "Slow Motion", by Nickelback from The Long Road, 2003
- "Slow Motion", by Saint Motel from Saintmotelevision, 2016
- "Slow Motion", by Shreya Ghoshal and Nakash Aziz from the film Bharat, 2019
- "Slow Motion", by Simple Plan from Harder Than It Looks, 2022
- "Slow Motion", by Slander and Bret James, 2018
- "Slow Motion", by the Sweet, 1968
- "Slow Motion", by Third Eye Blind from Blue, 1999
- "Slowmotion", by Treasure from The First Step: Treasure Effect, 2021
- "Slow Motion", by Alessia Cara from Love & Hyperbole, 2025

== Other ==
- Slow-motion approximation, in physics, an approximation used in relativistic mechanics
- Slow Motion, nickname of basketballer Kyle Anderson

== See also ==
- Slow movement (disambiguation)
