= 9 Shots =

Single by 50 Cent
- Released: August 14, 2015
- Recorded: 2015
- Genre: Hip hop
- Length: 2:14
- Label: G-Unit
- Songwriter: Curtis Jackson
- Producer: Frank Dukes

50 Cent singles chronology
"Get Low" (2015)	"9 Shots" (2015)	"Body Bags" (2015)

"9 Shots" is a song by American hip hop recording artist 50 Cent, released on August 14, 2015 as a non-album single. The song was produced by Frank Dukes.

== Music video ==
The music video for the song was directed by Eif Rivera. and it contains guest appearances by G-Unit mates Tony Yayo and Lloyd Banks. It premiered after the season two finale of the 50 Cent-produced series Power. The music video on YouTube has received over 25 million views as of April 2024.

== Background ==
50 Cent debuted a new single titled “9 Shots” produced by Frank Dukes at a Capitol Records event in NYC on Wednesday. 50 mentioned it is a metaphor between 9 moments of life and him being shot 9 times when he was starting his music career. The song was officially released the day after the live premiere and was also intended for Street King Immortal, which was shelved in 2021.

== Charts ==
Chart (2015)	Peak position
France (SNEP)	178
US Hot R&B/Hip-Hop Songs (Billboard)	48
