= The World Is Yours 2 =

Studio album by Rich the Kid
- Released: March 22, 2019
- Recorded: 2018
- Genres: Hip hop; trap
- Length: 44:46
- Labels: Rich Forever; Interscope
- Producers: CashMoneyAP; D.A. Got That Dope; David x Eli; DY; Foreign Teck; Frank Dukes; Lab Cook; Leon Thomas III; LNK; Louis Bell; Nard & B; Mario Petersen; Matt Cap; Narquise; Nick Mira; Nik D; Nils; OG Parker; Rex Kudo; Ricky Racks; Riko Spazzin; Sevn Thomas; Skynny; Smash David; T-Minus; Tee Romano; TrapMoneyBenny; Wheezy; XL

Rich the Kid chronology
The World Is Yours (2018)	The World Is Yours 2 (2019)	Boss Man (2020)

Singles from The World Is Yours 2
- 1. "Splashin" Released: December 4, 2018; 2. "4 Phones" Released: March 1, 2019; 3. "Tic Toc" Released: March 14, 2019; 4. "Save That" Released: May 28, 2019

The World Is Yours 2 is the second studio album by American rapper Rich the Kid. It was released through Interscope Records and Rich Forever Music on March 22, 2019, and follows its predecessor, The World Is Yours (2018). The album features guest appearances from Big Sean, YoungBoy Never Broke Again, Lil Pump, Takeoff, Offset, Tory Lanez, Young Thug, Gunna, Miguel, A Boogie wit da Hoodie, Jay Critch, Nav, Chris GTM and Ty Dolla Sign.

== Background ==
On September 25, 2018, Rich the Kid announced that he had completed his next album, tweeting that he had just "finished the album of the century".

Rich the Kid announced the album's release date on Twitter in November 2018. He later shared a preview of an unnamed track in an Instagram timeline post.

The tracklist was announced by frequent collaborator Migos via their Instagram story on January 3, 2019.

The artwork was unveiled via Twitter on January 10, 2019, and originally scheduled to release on January 18, 2019, but was delayed. The new release date was announced on February 28, 2019.

== Artwork ==
The album's artwork features Rich the Kid donning an all-black attire. Rich takes the money-stack from the predecessor, The World Is Yours (2018) and trades it for a shiny representation for "the world", thus perfecting the metaphor of the album title.

The title of the album also comes from the film Scarface as the predecessor, The World Is Yours (2018).

== Singles ==
The lead single, "Splashin" was released on December 4, 2018. The music video was released on January 9, 2019.

The second single, "4 Phones" was released on March 1, 2019, with an accompanied music video.

The third single, "Tic Toc" with Tory Lanez was released on March 14, 2019.

The fourth single, "Save That" was released to rhythmic contemporary radio on May 28, 2019.

=== Promotion ===
The lead promotional single, "Nasty", was released on October 4, 2018, with an accompanied music video.

The second promotional single, "Mo Paper" featuring YG, was released on October 25, 2018. It was later followed by a "farm-themed" music video.

== Critical reception ==
Professional ratings
Aggregate scores
Source	Rating
Metacritic	67/100
Review scores
Source	Rating
AllMusic	3.5/5 stars
Consequence	B−
HipHopDX	3.5.5
Pitchfork	5.6/10

The World Is Yours 2 received generally positive reviews from music critics. At Metacritic, which assigns a normalized rating out of 100 to reviews from mainstream publications, the mixtape received an average score of 67 based on four reviews, indicating "generally favorable reviews".

Writing for AllMusic, Fred Thomas said that "while Rich's hyperconfident personality is in full focus, The World Is Yours 2 is elevated to a higher plane by its smart production and who's-who of guest rappers." Lucy Shanker of Consequence wrote, "Although the surplus of features is at times overwhelming, The World Is Yours 2 is an extremely strong sophomore album." HipHopDX felt that Rich the Kid "has done a fine enough job with his second album, and he's successfully set the stage for a career that could be long, fruitful, and ultimately well-respected." In a mixed review, Sheldon Pearce of Pitchfork felt that the album's guest artists frequently outshined Rich the Kid himself, writing, "The only thing more engrossing than all this rich production is imagining [...] what a more engrossing rapper might have made of [this album]."

== Commercial performance ==
The World Is Yours 2 debuted at number four on the US Billboard 200 with 42,000 album-equivalent units (including 2,000 pure album sales) in its first week. It is Rich the Kid's second US top 10 album.

== Track listing ==
The World Is Yours 2 track listing
No.	Title	Writer(s)	Producer(s)	Length
1.	"World Is Yours 2 (Intro)"	Dimitri Roger; David Doman; Justin Thomas; Kevin Mars; Christina Gandy-Rodgers	D. A. Doman	2:12
2.	"Slide"	Roger; Dwan Avery; Adrian Hearne, Jr.; Jarad Higgins	DY; Riko Spazzin	2:48
3.	"Splashin"	Roger; Grant Dickinson; Adam Feeney	Lab Cook; Frank Dukes	2:57
4.	"Fall Threw" (featuring Young Thug and Gunna)	Roger; Jeffery Williams; Sergio Kitchens; Wesley Glass	Wheezy; Nils^{[b]}	3:09
5.	"Save That"	Roger; Doman; Adrienne Byrne	D. A. Doman	2:30
6.	"Two Cups" (featuring Offset and Big Sean)	Roger; Kiari Cephus; Sean Anderson; Tyler Williams	T-Minus	3:05
7.	"Racks Today"	Roger; Ricky Harrell, Jr.; Matthew Caprio	Ricky Racks; Matt Cap^{[b]}	2:35
8.	"Woah" (featuring Miguel and Ty Dolla Sign)	Roger; Miguel Pimentel; Tyrone Griffin; Rex Kudo; Rupert Thomas	Sevn Thomas; Kudo; Leon Thomas III^{[b]}	2:52
9.	"Tic Toc" (with Tory Lanez)	Roger; Daystar Peterson; Robert Williams; Michael Hernandez; Nik Dean	Foreign Teck; Nik D	2:30
10.	"Wrong Thing" (featuring NAV)	Roger; Navraj Goraya; Isaiah Jackson; Cory Johnson	Narquise; Skynny^{[a]}	2:30
11.	"4 Phones"	Roger; Samuel Jimenez; David Ruoff; Elias Klughammer	Smash David; David x Eli^{[a]}	3:37
12.	"Rockets" (featuring Takeoff and Lil Pump)	Roger; Kirsnick Ball; Gazzy Garcia; Benjamin Workman	TrapMoneyBenny	3:02
13.	"Like Mike" (featuring Jay Critch and A Boogie wit da Hoodie)	Roger; Jason Critchlow; Julius Dubrose; Brandon Rackley; James Rosser, Jr.; Trevon Campbell	Nard & B; XL	2:41
14.	"Racks Out"	Roger; Dickinson	Lab Cook; LNK^{[b]}; Mario Peterson^{[b]}	2:35
15.	"Ring Ring" (featuring Vory)	Roger; Tavoris Hollins, Jr.; Louis Bell; Nick Mira	Bell; Mira^{[b]}	2:47
16.	"For Keeps" (featuring YoungBoy Never Broke Again)	Roger; Kentrell Gaulden; Alex Petit	CashMoneyAP	2:56
Total length:				44:46

Notes

- ^{^[a]} signifies a co-producer
- ^{^[b]} signifies an uncredited co-producer

== Personnel ==
- Dexter Randall – recording (tracks 1, 14)
- Johann Chavez – recording (track 9)
- Michael "Mikfly Dottin – mixing (tracks 1, 7, 9, 10, 14)
- Colin Leonard – mastering (tracks 1, 9, 10, 14)

== Charts ==
=== Weekly charts ===
Weekly chart performance for The World Is Yours 2
Chart (2019)	Peak position
Australian Albums (ARIA)	33
Austrian Albums (Ö3 Austria)	55
Belgian Albums (Ultratop Flanders)	43
Belgian Albums (Ultratop Wallonia)	106
Canadian Albums (Billboard)	5
Danish Albums (Hitlisten)	39
Dutch Albums (Album Top 100)	14
French Albums (SNEP)	70
Irish Albums (IRMA)	45
Latvian Albums (LAIPA)	13
Lithuanian Albums (AGATA)	13
New Zealand Albums (RMNZ)	23
Norwegian Albums (VG-lista)	21
Swiss Albums (Schweizer Hitparade)	33
UK Albums (Official Charts)	42
US Billboard 200	4
US Top R&B/Hip-Hop Albums (Billboard)	3

=== Year-end charts ===
Year-end chart performance for The World Is Yours 2
Chart (2019)	Position
US Top R&B/Hip-Hop Albums (Billboard)	88
