= 0 to 100 / The Catch Up =

Single by Drake
- Released: June 1, 2014
- Genre: Hip hop
- Length: 6:08 (single version) 4:35 (radio edit)
- Label: Young Money; Cash Money; Republic
- Songwriters: Aubrey Graham; Anderson Hernandez; Matthew Samuels; Noah Shebib; Paul Jefferies; Adam Feeney; Chester Hansen
- Producers: Boi-1da; Vinylz; Frank Dukes (0 to 100); Nineteen85; 40 (The Catch Up)

Drake singles chronology
"Worst Behavior" (2014)	"0 to 100 / The Catch Up" (2014)	"Recognize" (2014)

"0 to 100 / The Catch Up" is a song recorded by Canadian rapper Drake. It was released on June 1, 2014 by Young Money Entertainment, Cash Money Records, and Republic Records. The song was certified Platinum by the Recording Industry Association of America (RIAA) on January 30, 2015, for selling over 1 million digital copies in the United States.

== Composition ==
"0 to 100 / The Catch Up" is a two part song with a length of six minutes and eight seconds. The first song, "0 to 100", is a stripped-back hip hop song that sonically and thematically resembles Drake's "Started from the Bottom" from his third studio album, Nothing Was the Same (2013). Instead of "starting from the bottom", "0 to 100" speaks of the rapper going from zero to one-hundred in order to gain ground on all of his competition. The second half of the song, titled "The Catch Up", features a sample of an unreleased James Blake song, and contrasts the boisterous claims of the first half with a pensive promise: that "if [Drake] hasn't passed you yet, watch [him] catch up now."

== Critical reception ==
The song received critical acclaim from music critics, appearing on several year-end top 10 lists. In July 2014, Billboard listed "0 to 100" as one of the "10 Best Songs of 2014 (so far)" saying that "months after releasing another hit album, Drizzy returned briefly to take it from '0 to 100' with careening bars punctuated by boasts like 'If I ain't the greatest, then I'm headed for it'." The magazine also listed the track as the best rap song of 2014. Rolling Stone listed the song as one of the "50 Best Songs of 2014", stating that it is "six minutes that pan across the whole Drake saga". HipHopDX named the song as one of the "Top 10 Singles of 2014".

The song was nominated for Best Rap Performance and Best Rap Song at the 57th Annual Grammy Awards.

== Usage in media ==
The song was used in a Sprite commercial starring Drake and Nas. The commercial was supposed to promote a limited-edition line of Sprite cans with hip-hop lyrics printed on them called "Obey Your Verse". The Sprite line featured the "Know yourself, know your worth" lyric from this song.

The lyric "She gon' be upset if she keep scrollin' to the left, dawg / She gon' see some shit that she don't wanna see" is referenced in Letterkenny 1x06 "A Fuss in the Back Bush".

The song is also featured in the NBA 2K16 basketball videogame soundtrack and is usually played during Golden State Warriors pre-match cutscenes as Warriors player Stephen Curry is mentioned in the song.

The song is also featured in the soundtrack for Madden NFL 25 (2024).

== Remixes ==
The instrumental became very popular among hip-hop artists, with several rappers such as the late XXXTentacion, Cassidy, Fat Trel, Remy Ma, David Stones, Montana of 300, G-Eazy, G-Unit (50 Cent, Lloyd Banks, Tony Yayo, Young Buck and Kidd Kidd), Gudda Gudda, Jin, Joell Ortiz, Lil Durk, Meek Mill, Ace Hood, Kurt Rock, Juice Box Boys, Papoose, Problem, Rich Homie Quan, Soulja Boy, Stiz Grimey, YFN Lucci, Uncle Murda, Vado, Waka Flocka Flame, Lil Mouse, Wiz Khalifa, Alpha Wann, Ernia and Stormzy recording their own versions of the song. The instrumental was used at the 2014 BET Hip Hop Awards for an on-stage cypher featuring various artists.

== Personnel ==
Adapted from TIDAL and comments to HNHH.

- Drake – vocals, songwriting
- Boi-1da – production
- Noel Cadastre – recording, additional drum programming

"0 to 100"

- Boi-1da – production, songwriting
- Vinylz – songwriting
- Frank Dukes – songwriting, sample producer
- Chester Hansen – bass (uncredited; songwriter on sample)

"The Catch Up"

- Nineteen85 – co-production
- 40 – co-production
- James Blake – songwriting, sample producer (uncredited)

== Charts ==
=== Weekly charts ===
Chart (2014)	Peak position
Australia Urban (ARIA)	27
Canada Hot 100 (Billboard)	59
Germany (Deutsche Black Charts)	2
UK Singles (Official Charts)	68
UK Hip Hop/R&B (Official Charts)	7
US Billboard Hot 100	35
US Hot R&B/Hip-Hop Songs (Billboard)	8
US Rhythmic Airplay (Billboard)	5

=== Year-end charts ===
Chart (2014)	Position
US Billboard Hot 100	97
US Hot R&B/Hip-Hop Songs (Billboard)	29
US Rhythmic (Billboard)	37

== Certifications ==
Region	Certification	Certified units/sales
Australia (ARIA)	2× Platinum	140,000^{‡}
Denmark (IFPI Danmark)	Gold	45,000^{‡}
United Kingdom (BPI)	Gold	400,000^{‡}
United States (RIAA)	2× Platinum	2,000,000^{‡}
^{‡} Sales+streaming figures based on certification alone.

== Release history ==
Region	Date	Format	Label	Ref.
United States	July 15, 2014	Digital download	OVO Sound; Young Money; Cash Money; Republic	
United States	August 5, 2014	Rhythmic contemporary radio	OVO Sound; Young Money; Cash Money; Republic	
