= Montana of 300 =

American rapper, singer and songwriter

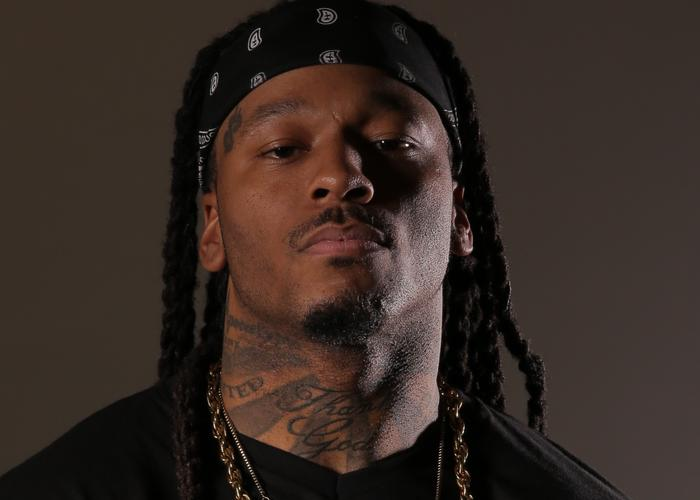

Background information
- Also known as: Montana; Tony
- Born: Walter Anthony Bradford; March 3, 1989 (age 37); Chicago, Illinois, United States
- Origin: Peoria, Illinois
- Genres: Midwestern hip-hop; drill; trap
- Occupations: Rapper; singer; songwriter
- Years active: 2007–present
- Labels: Fly Guy; Entertainment One
- Website: montana300.com

Walter Anthony "Tony" Bradford (born March 3, 1989), better known by his stage name Montana of 300 (or simply Montana), is an American rapper, singer and songwriter from Peoria, Illinois. During high school, he formed the hip-hop group 300, alongside Talley of 300. His debut studio album, Fire in the Church (2016), entered the Billboard 200. His next four albums — Don't Doubt the God (2017), Pray 4 the Devil (2018), A Gun In The Teacher’s Desk (2018), and Views from the General's Helmet (2019) — were each released on May 20; the significance of the date is unknown. After several delays, his sixth album, Rap God (2022) was released and announced as his final.

== Early life ==
Tony Bradford was born on March 3, 1989, in Chicago, Illinois. He has two brothers and three sisters. He started rapping at age 15, and grew up listening to artists such as Tupac, DMX, Lil Wayne, and Jay-Z. Both his parents suffered from serious substance abuse issues, his father from alcohol and his mother from crack cocaine. After witnessing his parents' struggles, Montana ceased using narcotics, not wanting to "fry his brain."

In 2008, Montana, his friend from high school, Montelle Talley (known professionally as "Talley of 300"), as well as several others joined to form the rap group "300". The name for the group was based on the movie of the same name, in which a group of 300 Spartans overcome more than 300,000 Persian Soldiers to hold on to their territory. Montana was particularly inspired by the line, "No Surrender, No Retreat, Only the hard, only the strong, Against all odds".

== Career ==
In 2014, Montana released his first mixtape, titled Cursed with a Blessing. In September 2015, Montana made a cameo appearance in the popular television show, Empire. In December 2015, Montana and Talley of 300 released a collaborative mixtape titled Gunz and Roses. Staples of this tape included "FGE Cypher" and "Mf's Mad".

On May 20, 2016, Montana released his debut studio album, titled Fire in the Church. The 18-track release, which only included features from his Fly Guy Entertainment labelmates and Kevin Gates, was lauded by XXL magazine for its "heat-seeking bars and thought-provoking metaphors". The album peaked at #95 on the Billboard 200.

On February 10, 2017, Montana released a compilation album with his Fly Guy labelmates, titled No Surrender No Retreat.

On February 11, 2025, it was announced that Montana was arrested on multiple charges; such as Criminal Trespassing, Domestic Battery, Resisting Arrest, and Theft.

== Discography ==
=== Albums ===
==== Studio albums ====
List of studio albums, with selected details and chart positions
Title	Album details	Peak chart positions			
Title	Album details	US	US R&B/HH	US Rap	US Ind.
Fire in the Church	Released: May 20, 2016; Label: Fly Guy Entertainment; Format: CD, digital download	95	7	2	11
Don't Doubt the God	Released: May 20, 2017; Label: Fly Guy Entertainment, E1 Music; Format: CD, digital download	—	—	4	22
Pray for the Devil	Released: May 20, 2018; Label: Fly Guy Entertainment, E1 Music; Format: CD, digital download	—	—	3	37
A Gun in the Teachers Desk	Released: November 16, 2018; Label: Fly Guy Entertainment, E1 Music; Format: CD, digital download	—	—	10	—
Views from the General's Helmet	Released: May 20, 2019; Label: Fly Guy Entertainment, E1 Music; Format: CD, digital download	—	—	—	—
Rap God	Released: January 6, 2022; Label: Fly Guy Entertainment, E1 Music; Format: CD, digital download	—	—	—	1

==== Mixtapes ====
List of mixtapes, with selected details
Title	Details
Cursed With a Blessing	Released: December 1, 2014; Label: Fly Guy Entertainment; Format: Digital download
Gunz n Roses (with Talley of 300)	Released: December 2, 2015; Label: TSO Records; Format: Digital download

==== Compilation album ====
Title	Details
No Surrender No Retreat (with Fly Guy Entertainment)	Released: February 10, 2017; Label: Fly Guy Entertainment; Format: CD, digital download

Top flow

Released 2025

=== Singles ===
==== As lead artist ====
List of singles as lead artist, showing year released and album name
Title	Year	Album
"Derrick Rose MVP Song"	2011	Non-album single
"Ice Cream Truck"	2014	Cursed With a Blessing
"Gas Mask" (with Talley of 300)	2015	Gunz n Roses
"Nothing New" (with Talley of 300)	2015	Gunz n Roses
"You Know" (with Talley of 300)	2015	Gunz n Roses
"Mf's Mad, Pt. 2" (featuring Talley of 300)	2016	Fire in the Church
"Land of the Dark"	2016	Fire in the Church
"Here Now"	2016	Fire in the Church
"Wts Now"	2016	Fire in the Church
"Dirty Dancin'"	2017	Don't Doubt the God
"Ugly"	2018	Pray for the Devil
"Chiraq vs. NY"	2018	Pray for the Devil
"Been a Beast"	2018	A Gun in the Teacher's Desk
"Dip-n-Sauce"	2018	A Gun in the Teacher's Desk

==== As featured artist ====
List of singles as featured artist, showing year released and album name
Title	Year	Album
"Bad Combo" (Nasty Nem featuring Montana of 300)	2014	Non-album single
"Black On Black Everything" (Talley Of 300 featuring Montana of 300)	2014	Thanksgiving
"Upstate RockStar" (Locx featuring Montana of 300)	2015	Non-album singles
"Stephen Curry" (J Real featuring Montana of 300)	2015	Non-album singles
"Black Out" (Jax Teller featuring Montana of 300)	2015	Just Another Crazy Kraka
"Like Me" (Jewelz Montalvo featuring Montana of 300, Abbie and Tatiana Carrion)	2016	Non-album singles
"Come Up" (Innocent featuring Montana of 300)	2017	Non-album singles

== Filmography ==
Television series
Year	Title	Role	Notes
2015	Empire	Jamming Prisoner	Episode: "Without a Country"
2017	The Quad	Dreds	Episode: "Pilot"
