= Pop Style =

Single by Drake featuring the Throne (Note: The Throne is a duo composed of Jay-Z and Kanye West. They are only credited on the single version.)

from the album Views
- Released: April 5, 2016
- Recorded: 2015
- Genre: Hip hop
- Length: 3:29
- Label: Young Money; Cash Money
- Songwriters: Aubrey Graham; Kanye West; Shawn Carter; Adam Feeney; Matthew Samuels; Noah "40" Shebib; Rupert Thomas, Jr.
- Producers: Frank Dukes; Seven; Boi-1da; 40

Drake singles chronology
"Come and See Me" (2016)	"Pop Style" and "One Dance" (2016)	"Why You Always Hatin?" (2016)

Jay-Z singles chronology
"Seen It All" (2014)	"Pop Style" (2016)	"All the Way Up (Remix)" (2016)

Kanye West singles chronology
"Famous" (2016)	"Pop Style" (2016)	"Figure It Out" (2016)

"Pop Style" is a song by Canadian rapper Drake, featuring American rappers Kanye West and Jay-Z, collectively credited as the Throne. The song was released alongside "One Dance", as singles promoting Drake's fourth studio album Views, initially for exclusive digital download on iTunes on April 5, 2016. The album version features only Drake with a new verse. The single version was nominated for Best Rap Performance at the 59th Grammy Awards.

== Background ==
The song is a collaboration between Drake and Kanye West and Jay-Z (collectively known as the Throne, a reference to their collaborative album Watch the Throne). It is the first time the three have appeared on the same track. However, the contribution from Jay-Z is limited in the song, with only two lines from Jay-Z making the cut ("They still out to get me, they don't get it/ I can not be gotten, that's a given"). In an extended version of the song the lines by Jay-Z were used as the start of a new verse. Also appearing in the song is Kanye saying "Imma let you finish", referencing his controversial statement during the 2009 MTV Video Music Awards, and the "Perfect" sample (Street Fighter II) used in his seventh studio album, The Life of Pablo. Kanye West has also performed the song live. In the lyrics, Drake mentions Channing Tatum, Justin Timberlake and his song "Rock Your Body".

== Chart performance ==
In the United States, "Pop Style" debuted and peaked at No. 16 on the US Billboard Hot 100 on the chart dating April 23, 2016; it sold 128,000 copies on two days of sales, also debuting atop the US Digital Songs chart. It also debuted at No. 4 on the Hot R&B/Hip-Hop Songs and No. 1 on the R&B/Hip-Hop Digital Songs charts. As of October 2016, it has sold 539,000 copies in the United States.

== Personnel ==
The following are credited as songwriters. Adapted from Jaxsta.

Production

- Sevn Thomas – production, drum programming, arrangement
- Frank Dukes – production, instrumentation
- Boi-1da – additional production, drum programming, bass guitar
- 40 – additional production, bass guitar
- Drake – vocals
- Kanye West – vocals
- Jay-Z – vocals

Technical

- Noel Cadastre – recording
- 40 – recording
- Greg Moffett – assistant engineer
- Harley Arsenault – assistant engineer
- Michael Brooks – assistant mixer
- Tom "Classic" Hardy – assistant mixer

== Charts ==
=== Weekly charts ===
Chart (2016)	Peak position
Australia (ARIA)	44
Canada Hot 100 (Billboard)	19
Czech Republic Singles Digital (ČNS IFPI)	90
France (SNEP)	29
Ireland (IRMA)	58
Italy (FIMI)	93
Netherlands (Single Top 100)	73
New Zealand Heatseekers (Recorded Music NZ)	5
Scottish Singles Sales (Official Charts)	31
Sweden Heatseeker (Sverigetopplistan)	2
UK Singles (Official Charts)	33
UK Hip Hop/R&B (Official Charts)	6
US Billboard Hot 100	16
US Hot R&B/Hip-Hop Songs (Billboard)	4

=== Year-end charts ===
Chart (2016)	Position
Canada (Canadian Hot 100)	76
US Billboard Hot 100	82
US Hot R&B/Hip-Hop Songs (Billboard)	28

== Certifications ==
Region	Certification	Certified units/sales
Australia (ARIA)	Platinum	70,000^{‡}
United Kingdom (BPI)	Gold	400,000^{‡}
United States (RIAA)	2× Platinum	2,000,000^{‡}
^{‡} Sales+streaming figures based on certification alone.
