= Dolerme =

2020 promotional single by Rosalía

Promotional single by Rosalía
- Language: Spanish
- English title: "Hurt Me"
- Released: 24 March 2020
- Genre: Pop; alternative rock
- Length: 2:23
- Label: Columbia; Sony
- Songwriters: Pablo Díaz-Reixa; Rosalía Vila
- Producer: Frank Dukes

Lyric video
- "Dolerme" on YouTube

"Dolerme" (transl. "Hurt Me") is the debut promotional single by Spanish singer and songwriter Rosalía. It was released through Sony and Columbia Records on 24 March 2020. The song release was supported by a lyric video which shows a cartoon picture of the singer and her pet chihuahua lying in a blue bedroom.

== Background ==
The song was a surprise-release with no previous announcement by Rosalía. Instead, the singer took to Instagram to explain that she was in self-isolation due to COVID-19 at the time of the release and that she had lost track of time. She was hoping to make people feel better with the song, the same way making music supports her own mental health. Before the coronavirus pandemic, Rosalía was scheduled to release a "very aggressive and powerful single" alongside an American artist in March but ended up releasing "Dolerme" because she fell it matched more her current mood and the worlds', she told El Hormiguero. The song has not had any radio impact so it must not be classified as a single. Rosalía was spending this phase of quarantine in her manager's house in Miami since she was recording her new album when flights to Europe from the US and vice versa were banned on March 13.

== Composition ==
The song was described as a "mid-tempo ballad" dealing with a "heartbreak", which, being "built on that guitar and keyboard loops, is distinctly pop as well, though Rosalía applies her flamenco tendencies". Lyrically, the track talks about "a fiery on-again, off-again relationship" which is not "helping this whole "isolated" thing", according to Vulture writer Zoe Haylock.

== Critical reception ==
Patrick Johnson of Hypebeast thought that the song "finds Rosalía gracefully searching for balance between her traditional Flamenco roots with a modern, pop-infused vibe" while her vocals are characterized by "faint auto-tune with echoing layers". Suzette Fernandez at Billboard labeled it a "stark departure from her previous material" with Rosalía proving "herself to be a chameleon".

== Credits and personnel ==
Credits adapted from Tidal.

- Rosalía Vila – vocals, songwriting, composer, miscellaneous production
- Frank Dukes – production, composer
- Pablo Díaz-Reixa – songwriting, composer, miscellaneous production
- Chris Athens – master engineering
- Matt Tavares – miscellaneous production
- Manny Marroquin – mixing engineering
- David Rodriguez – recording engineering

== Charts ==
Chart (2020)	Peak position
Spain (PROMUSICAE)	11
Mexico (Mexico Airplay)	19

== Certifications ==
Certifications for "Dolerme"
Region	Certification	Certified units/sales
Mexico (AMPROFON)	Gold	30,000^{‡}
^{‡} Sales+streaming figures based on certification alone.
