= Right Hand (song) =

Single by Drake
- Released: July 31, 2015
- Genre: Hip hop
- Length: 3:10
- Label: Cash Money; Young Money; Republic
- Songwriters: Aubrey Graham; Anderson Hernandez; Tyler Bryant; Adam Feeney; Kaan Gunesberk
- Producers: Vinylz; Frank Dukes; Velous; Gunesberk

Drake singles chronology
"Hotline Bling" (2015)	"Right Hand" (2015)	"Jumpman" (2015)

"Right Hand" is a song by Canadian rapper Drake. It was released as a single digitally on July 31, 2015. Drake posted the song along with "Charged Up" and "Hotline Bling" on his blog. It was produced by Vinylz, Frank Dukes, Velous and Kaan Gunesberk.

== Personnel ==
Adapted from TIDAL.

- Frank Dukes – production, songwriting
- Vinylz – production, songwriting
- Drake – songwriting, vocals
- Kaan Gunesberk – songwriting, backing vocals
- Velous – songwriting

== Charts ==
=== Commercial performance ===
In the United States, "Right Hand" sold 27,000 copies in its first week at digital retailers, spurring a debut at number 29 on the Hot R&B/Hip-Hop Songs chart dated August 22, 2015. Over a month later, a strong surge in digital download sales led to its debut at number 66 on the Billboard Hot 100 dated October 2, 2015; it sold 31,000 copies that week, earning its best sales frame up to that point. It has since peaked at number 58. As of October 2015, the song has sold 230,000 copies in the United States.

=== Weekly charts ===
Chart (2015–2016)	Peak position
Canada (Canadian Hot 100)	72
UK Singles (OCC)	81
US Billboard Hot 100	58
US Hot R&B/Hip-Hop Songs (Billboard)	19

== Certifications and sales ==
Region	Certification	Certified units/sales
Australia (ARIA)	Platinum	70,000^{‡}
United Kingdom (BPI)	Silver	200,000^{‡}
United States (RIAA)	Platinum	1,000,000^{‡}
^{‡} Sales+streaming figures based on certification alone.

== Release history ==
Country	Date	Format	Label
United States	July 31, 2015	Digital download	Cash Money; Republic
