= Slow movement =

Slow movement may refer to:

- Slow movement (music)
- Slow movement (culture)
- Bradykinesia, "slow movement", a symptom of Parkinson's disease
