= Fake Love (Drake song) =

Single by Drake

from the album More Life
- Released: October 29, 2016
- Genre: Hip-hop; R&B
- Length: 3:28 (single version); 3:32 (album version)
- Label: Young Money; Cash Money
- Songwriters: Aubrey Graham; Brittany Hazzard; Anderson Hernandez; Adam Feeney; Gene McFadden; John Whitehead; Leon Huff
- Producers: Vinylz; Frank Dukes

Drake singles chronology
| "Big Amount" (2016) | "Fake Love" (2016) | "Sneakin'" (2016) |

"Fake Love" is a song by Canadian rapper Drake, released as the lead single from his 2017 mixtape, More Life. It was co-written by Drake with Starrah, Vinylz, and Frank Dukes, while the latter two handled the song's production. The song was released for digital download on October 29, 2016, through Young Money Entertainment and Cash Money Records.

== Composition and lyrics ==
"Fake Love" features an R&B beat. Lyrically, it focuses on peers who only appreciate Drake for his success, and would not care for him otherwise, hence the lyric, "fake people showing fake love to me".

The lyrics "That's when they smile in my face/Whole time they wanna take my place" are an interpolation of The O'Jays' song "Back Stabbers".

== Critical reception ==
Sheldon Pearce of Pitchfork compared the song to "Hotline Bling" and called it "infectious and vaguely familiar, with top notes of several songs in the Drake canon".

== Commercial performance ==
As of March 27, 2017, "Fake Love" has sold 784,000 copies in the United States.

== Charts ==
=== Weekly charts ===
| Chart (2016–2017) | Peak position |
|---|---|
| Australia (ARIA) | 16 |
| Australia Urban (ARIA) | 4 |
| Austria (Ö3 Austria Top 40) | 49 |
| Belgium (Ultratip Bubbling Under Flanders) | 3 |
| Belgium (Ultratip Bubbling Under Wallonia) | 5 |
| Canada Hot 100 (Billboard) | 10 |
| Czech Republic Singles Digital (ČNS IFPI) | 28 |
| Denmark (Tracklisten) | 14 |
| Euro Digital Song Sales (Billboard) | 15 |
| France (SNEP) | 79 |
| Germany (GfK) | 54 |
| Ireland (IRMA) | 18 |
| Italy (FIMI) | 55 |
| Netherlands (Dutch Top 40) | 35 |
| Netherlands (Single Top 100) | 19 |
| New Zealand Heatseekers (Recorded Music NZ) | 3 |
| Norway (VG-lista) | 40 |
| Portugal (AFP) | 14 |
| Scottish Singles Sales (Official Charts) | 32 |
| Slovakia Singles Digital (ČNS IFPI) | 27 |
| Spain (Promusicae) | 73 |
| Sweden (Sverigetopplistan) | 31 |
| Switzerland (Schweizer Hitparade) | 27 |
| UK Hip Hop/R&B (Official Charts) | 1 |
| UK Singles (Official Charts) | 10 |
| US Billboard Hot 100 | 8 |
| US Hot R&B/Hip-Hop Songs (Billboard) | 4 |
| US Pop Airplay (Billboard) | 16 |
| US Rhythmic Airplay (Billboard) | 1 |

=== Year-end charts ===
| Chart (2016) | Position |
|---|---|
| Australia Urban (ARIA) | 17 |

| Chart (2017) | Position |
|---|---|
| Canada (Canadian Hot 100) | 49 |
| Portugal (AFP) | 71 |
| UK Singles (Official Charts Company) | 91 |
| US Billboard Hot 100 | 37 |
| US Hot R&B/Hip-Hop Songs (Billboard) | 18 |
| US Rhythmic (Billboard) | 5 |

== Certifications ==
| Region | Certification | Certified units/sales |
|---|---|---|
| Australia (ARIA) | 4× Platinum | 280,000^{‡} |
| Brazil (Pro-Música Brasil) | Platinum | 60,000^{‡} |
| Denmark (IFPI Danmark) | Platinum | 90,000^{‡} |
| France (SNEP) | Gold | 66,666^{‡} |
| Germany (BVMI) | Gold | 200,000^{‡} |
| Italy (FIMI) | Platinum | 50,000^{‡} |
| Portugal (AFP) | Platinum | 10,000^{‡} |
| United Kingdom (BPI) | 2× Platinum | 1,200,000^{‡} |
| United States (RIAA) | 6× Platinum | 6,000,000^{‡} |
^{‡} Sales+streaming figures based on certification alone.
