= Pray for Me (The Weeknd and Kendrick Lamar song) =

Single by the Weeknd and Kendrick Lamar

from the album Black Panther: The Album
- Released: February 2, 2018
- Genre: Pop rap
- Length: 3:31: 2:45 (short version)
- Label: Top Dawg; Aftermath; Interscope
- Songwriters: Abel Tesfaye; Kendrick Duckworth; Adam Feeney; Martin McKinney
- Producers: Doc McKinney; Frank Dukes

The Weeknd singles chronology
"Secrets" (2017)	"Pray for Me" (2018)	"Call Out My Name" (2018)

Kendrick Lamar singles chronology
"King's Dead" (2018)	"Pray for Me" (2018)	"Dedication" (2018)

Music video
- "Pray for Me (Lyric Video)" on YouTube

"Pray for Me" is a song by the Canadian singer-songwriter the Weeknd and the American rapper Kendrick Lamar from the soundtrack album of the Marvel Studios superhero film Black Panther. The song was released by Top Dawg Entertainment, Aftermath Entertainment, and Interscope Records on February 2, 2018, as the album's third and final single. It serves as the second overall collaboration between the two artists. The song appears in the film during the scene where the titular hero along with his allies, Nakia and Okoye, enter a secret casino in Busan.

== Background and release ==
The Weeknd first hinted at his involvement with the Black Panther soundtrack album with an Instagram post that he made on January 19, 2018, which contained an illustration of the Marvel superhero Black Panther perched on a tree in front of the moon. On January 26, 2018, the Weeknd then further hinted at his involvement with the soundtrack when he uploaded an official trailer for the Black Panther film to his Instagram account. Then on January 31, 2018, Lamar confirmed the Weeknd's involvement with the soundtrack when he uploaded to his Twitter account the complete tracklist of the soundtrack, which contained the song "Pray for Me". On February 1, 2018, the Weeknd uploaded to his Twitter account a video teasing the release date for "Pray for Me" as the soundtrack's third single.

== Composition ==
"Pray for Me" is composed in the key of E minor.

== Reception ==
Alex Robert Ross of Noisey praised the song, calling it "short, punchy, and self-lacerating."

== Commercial performance ==
"Pray For Me" met a global success but less than the Weeknd's previous singles. It reached the top ten in Australia, Denmark, Finland, Greece, Lebanon, Norway, Portugal and Sweden, top twenty in Ireland, New Zealand, Scotland and United Kingdom, top thirty in Germany, the Flemish region of Belgium, the Netherlands and Switzerland, top forty in Austria, Hungary and Slovakia and top fifty in France. It peaked at number seven on US Billboard Hot 100.

== Copyright infringement lawsuit ==
In February 2020, Tesfaye and Lamar were sued by now-split American experimental rock band Yeasayer for alleged plagiarism due to vocal similarities with their 2007 song "Sunrise". According to the lawsuit, the part allegedly stolen from the song includes "the recording of a distinctive choral performance, which Plaintiffs [Yeasayer] created and recorded using their own voices". Furthermore, Yeasayer claims that "Defendants extracted Plaintiffs' choral performance from a recording of 'Sunrise,' slightly modified it, including, on information and belief, via postprocessing to alter its pitch, among other qualities" and then subsequently used the modified audio in their own song. Both Tesfaye and Lamar have denied the accusation. The lawsuit later reached its conclusion in July 2020, after Yeasayer dropped it.

== Credits and personnel ==
Credits and personnel adapted from digital booklet.

- Kendrick Lamar – songwriting, lead vocals
- The Weeknd – songwriting, lead vocals
- Frank Dukes – songwriting, production
- Doc McKinney – songwriting, production, recording
- Beatriz Artola – recording
- Shin Kamiyama – recording
- Mike Sonier – recording
- Barry McCready – recording assistance
- Jaycen Joshua – mixing
- David Nakaji – mixing assistance
- Mike Bozzi – mastering
- Chris Athens – mastering

== Charts ==
=== Weekly charts ===
Chart (2018)	Peak position
Australia (ARIA)	9
Austria (Ö3 Austria Top 40)	32
Belgium (Ultratop 50 Flanders)	22
Belgium (Ultratop 50 Wallonia)	39
Canada Hot 100 (Billboard)	5
Canada CHR/Top 40 (Billboard)	1
Canada Hot AC (Billboard)	16
Colombia (National-Report)	63
Czech Republic Airplay (ČNS IFPI)	57
Denmark (Tracklisten)	6
Euro Digital Song Sales (Billboard)	14
Ecuador (National-Report)	95
Finland (Suomen virallinen lista)	9
France (SNEP)	44
Germany (GfK)	24
Greece International (IFPI)	3
Hungary (Single Top 40)	36
Hungary (Stream Top 40)	10
Ireland (IRMA)	12
Italy (FIMI)	72
Lebanon (OLT20)	2
Mexico Airplay (Billboard)	34
Netherlands (Dutch Top 40)	14
Netherlands (Single Top 100)	22
New Zealand (Recorded Music NZ)	12
Norway (VG-lista)	6
Portugal (AFP)	10
Scotland Singles (OCC)	19
Slovakia Airplay (ČNS IFPI)	37
Spain (Promusicae)	84
Sweden (Sverigetopplistan)	4
Switzerland (Schweizer Hitparade)	21
UK Singles (OCC)	11
UK Hip Hop/R&B (OCC)	5
US Billboard Hot 100	7
US Adult Pop Airplay (Billboard)	31
US Dance Club Songs (Billboard)	47
US Dance/Mix Show Airplay (Billboard)	4
US Hot R&B/Hip-Hop Songs (Billboard)	4
US Pop Airplay (Billboard)	3
US R&B/Hip-Hop Airplay (Billboard)	19
US Rhythmic Airplay (Billboard)	1

=== Year-end charts ===
Chart (2018)	Position
Australia (ARIA)	71
Canada (Canadian Hot 100)	33
Denmark (Tracklisten)	75
Iceland (Plötutíóindi)	16
Netherlands (Dutch Top 40)	81
Portugal (AFP)	107
US Billboard Hot 100	40
US Dance/Mix Show Airplay (Billboard)	24
US Hot R&B/Hip-Hop Songs (Billboard)	19
US Mainstream Top 40 (Billboard)	23
US Rhythmic (Billboard)	8

== Certifications ==
Region	Certification	Certified units/sales
Australia (ARIA)	4× Platinum	280,000^{‡}
Austria (IFPI Austria)	Gold	15,000^{‡}
Brazil (Pro-Música Brasil)	Diamond	160,000^{‡}
Canada (Music Canada)	5× Platinum	400,000^{‡}
Denmark (IFPI Danmark)	Platinum	90,000^{‡}
France (SNEP)	Diamond	333,333^{‡}
Germany (BVMI)	Gold	200,000^{‡}
Italy (FIMI)	Gold	50,000^{‡}
New Zealand (RMNZ)	2× Platinum	60,000^{‡}
Poland (ZPAV)	Platinum	50,000^{‡}
Spain (Promusicae)	Gold	30,000^{‡}
United Kingdom (BPI)	Platinum	600,000^{‡}
United States (RIAA)	2× Platinum	2,000,000^{‡}
Streaming
Greece (IFPI Greece)	Platinum	2,000,000^{†}
Sweden (GLF)	Platinum	8,000,000^{†}
^{‡} Sales+streaming figures based on certification alone.^{†} Streaming-only figures based on certification alone.

== Release history ==
Region	Date	Format	Label(s)	Ref.
United States	February 2, 2018	Digital download; streaming	Top Dawg; Aftermath; Interscope	
United Kingdom	February 2, 2018	Rhythmic contemporary	Top Dawg; XO; Republic; Interscope	
United States	February 6, 2018	Rhythmic contemporary	Top Dawg; XO; Republic; Interscope	
United States	February 6, 2018	Contemporary hit radio	Top Dawg; XO; Republic; Interscope	
United Kingdom	February 9, 2018	Contemporary hit radio	Top Dawg; XO; Republic; Interscope	
Italy	March 2, 2018	Contemporary hit radio	Universal	
