= Kaan Güneşberk =

Canadian musician, songwriter, and composer

Kaan Gunesberk
- Born: Kaan Güneşberk; Ottawa, Ontario
- Occupations: Musician; songwriter; session musician
- Instruments: Vocals; keyboards; guitar; bass guitar; saxophone
- Years active: 2013–present

Kaan Güneşberk, commonly anglicized Kaan Gunesberk, is a Canadian musician, songwriter, and composer. He is best known as a close collaborator of producer Frank Dukes, with whom he has penned hits for Post Malone ("Better Now," "Circles") and Camila Cabello ("Havana"). Among other awards, he was nominated for the Grammy Award for Song of the Year in 2020 for co-writing "Circles".

== Biography ==
Güneşberk was raised in Ottawa, Ontario and attended the arts magnet school Canterbury High School. He attended the jazz program at University of Toronto. In Toronto, he formed the experimental electronic band Kilmanjaro. The band was active between 2012 and 2018, releasing their debut album in 2017. He is part of a number of other Toronto-based music projects.

Güneşberk began collaborating with Frank Dukes early in his professional career. His first major songwriting placement was on the 2015 Drake single "Right Hand" on which Güneşberk also sings background vocals. During the rest of the decade, Güneşberk would closely collaborate with Dukes, working in the studio with him and artists Post Malone and Camila Cabello, among others. He has also contributed to tracks for Frank Ocean, Zayn Malik, Aminé, and Lorde. He has Turkish ancestry.

== Discography ==
Solo discography

- Selina/Pull Start Push Stop (A/B) (2019)
- The Realist (Single) (2020)
- Does Anybody Really Know (2020)
- New World Volition [still dope in 2046] (Mixtape) (2020)

With Kilmanjaro

- Kilmanjaro EP (2014)
- A Place Unknown To All You Ever Say (2017)

With Owen Wilson

- EP (2015)
- EP II (2016)
- Computor EP (2017)

With Elegance

- EP (2016)

== Songwriting discography ==
Selected credits, sourced from SOCAN and Jaxsta. Songwriting credit unless otherwise noted.

- Drake – "Right Hand" single (2015); writer, producer, backing vocals
- Estan – The Vanity Of Reason (2015); saxophone
- James Vincent McMorrow – "I Lie Awake Every Night" from We Move (2016); bass, electric guitar, background vocals
- Mac Miller – "Planet God Damn" from The Divine Feminine (2016)
- Mac Miller – "We" from The Divine Feminine (2016)
- Post Malone – "Deja Vu" (featuring Justin Bieber) from Stoney (2016); writing, background vocals
- Aminé – "Sundays" from Good for You (2017)
- Ben Stevenson – "Honeycola" from Cara Cara (2017)
- Beachtown Exile – Good Night E.P. (2017); producer, instrumentation, backup vocals
- Huncho Jack (Travis Scott & Quavo) – "Motorcycle Patches" from Huncho Jack, Jack Huncho (2017); also synth and production
- Matty – Déjàvu (2018); instrumentation, backing vocals
- ZAYN – "Still Got Time" (featuring PartyNextDoor) (uncredited)
- Calvin Love – Highway Dancer (2018); producer, instrumentation, backing vocals
- Emmett O'Reilly – EP1 (2018); bass, backing vocals
- Katie McBride – "N.B.S.L." from World of Dreams (2018); background vocals
- Post Malone – "Better Now" from Beerbongs & Bentleys (2018)
- Jerry Paper – "Your Cocoon" from Like A Baby (2018); keys
- Jerry Paper – "Everything Borrowed" from Like A Baby (2018); keys
- Camila Cabello – "All These Years" from Camila (2018); also keys, guitar
- Camila Cabello – "Havana" (featuring Young Thug) from Camila (2018); also keys
- Camila Cabello – "Inside Out" from Camila (2018); also piano, vibraphone
- Camila Cabello – "Into It" from Camila (2018); also synth
- Camila Cabello – "Havana" (remix) (with Daddy Yankee) from Camila (2018)
- Language Arts – "Luckiness (Remix)" (2018); remix artist
- Travis Scott – "Wake Up" from Astroworld (2018)
- Matty – "How Can He Be" from Déjàvu (2018)
- Matty – "I'll Gladly Place Myself Below You" from Déjàvu (2018)
- Matty – "Clear" from Déjàvu (2018)
- Matty – "Nothing Yet" from Déjàvu (2018)
- Matty – "Butter" from Déjàvu (2018)
- Mozzy, Sjava, REASON – "Seasons" from Black Panther: The Album (2018); intro vocals and piano
- Calvin Love – "Dreams keep Callin'" from Highway Dancer (2018); producer
- Calvin Love – "What is Reality?" from Highway Dancer (2018); producer
- Chris Brown – "Need a Stack" (featuring Lil Wayne and Joyner Lucas) from Indigo (2019)
- Stormzy – "Handsome" from Heavy is the Head (2019)
- Kevin Garrett – "Warn" from Hoax (2019)
- Rayland Baxster – "We" from Good Mmornin (2019)
- Post Malone – "A Thousand Bad Times" from Hollywood's Bleeding (2019); also programming
- Post Malone – "Circles" from Hollywood's Bleeding (2019); also guitar
- Post Malone – "Take What You Want" (feat. Ozzy Osbourne & Travis Scott) from Hollywood's Bleeding (2019); programming
- Stormzy – "Handsome" from Heavy is the Head (2019)
- Mind Bath – "Pray" single (2020)
- G-Eazy – "Love You Like You Do" from The Beautiful & Damned (Deluxe Edition) (2020)
- The Weeknd – "Alone Again" from After Hours (2020)
- Shawn Mendes – "Monster" (with Justin Bieber) from Wonder (2020); additional producer credit
- Ben Stevenson – "Saturn in Blue" from Whatever & Ever (2021)
- Ben Stevenson – "Too Many Moons" from Whatever & Ever (2021)
- Ben Stevenson – "New Moon/Purple & Gold" from Whatever & Ever (2021)
- Ben Stevenson – "Burning for You" from Whatever & Ever (2021)

== Awards and nominations ==
=== Grammy Awards ===
Year	Award	Nominated work	Result
2019	Album of the Year	Beerbongs & Bentleys (as songwriter)	Nominated
2019	Best Rap Album	Astroworld (as songwriter)	Nominated
2019	Best Pop Vocal Album	Camila (as songwriter)	Nominated
2021	Album of the Year	Hollywood's Bleeding (as songwriter)	Nominated
2021	Song of the Year	"Circles" (as songwriter)	Nominated
