= Splashin =

Single by Rich The Kid

from the album The World Is Yours 2
- Released: December 3, 2018
- Genre: Hip hop; trap
- Length: 2:58
- Label: Interscope
- Songwriters: Dimitri Roger; Grant Dickinson; Adam Feeney
- Producers: Lab Cook; Frank Dukes

Rich The Kid singles chronology
"Mo Paper" (2018)	"Splashin" (2018)	"4 Phones" (2019)

Music video
- "Splashin" on YouTube

"Splashin" is a song by American rapper Rich the Kid. It was released on December 3, 2018, as the lead single from his second studio album The World Is Yours 2. The song peaked at number 80 on the Billboard Hot 100.

== Critical reception ==
The song received generally positive reviews. Aron A. of HotNewHipHop called the track's instrumental "lurky" and "bass-heavy". Trent Fitzgerald of XXL said that the track "should have the clubs bumping throughout the holiday season". Torsten Ingvaldsen of Hypebeast called the track "menacing".

== Music video ==
The music video for the track was released on January 8, 2019. Rich the Kid himself stated that the video was inspired by Missy Elliott in an interview with Billboard.

== Charts ==
Chart (2018–2019)	Peak position
Canada (Canadian Hot 100)	59
New Zealand Hot Singles (RMNZ)	21
US Billboard Hot 100	80

== Certifications ==
Region	Certification	Certified units/sales
United States (RIAA)	Platinum	1,000,000^{‡}
^{‡} Sales+streaming figures based on certification alone.
