= I Forgot That You Existed =

2019 song by Taylor Swift

Song by Taylor Swift

from the album Lover
- Released: August 23, 2019
- Studio: Electric Feel (Los Angeles)
- Genre: Bubblegum pop; R&B; electropop; tropical house
- Length: 2:50
- Label: Republic
- Songwriters: Taylor Swift; Louis Bell; Adam King Feeney
- Producers: Taylor Swift; Louis Bell; Frank Dukes

Audio video
- "I Forgot That You Existed" on YouTube

"I Forgot That You Existed" is a song by the American singer-songwriter Taylor Swift from her seventh studio album, Lover (2019). She wrote and produced the track with Louis Bell and Frank Dukes. "I Forgot That You Existed" is a bubblegum pop, R&B, electropop, and tropical house song that features a pop rap beat, a minimalist production, and lyrics about moving on and feeling indifferent to past pain.

Some music critics praised the song for its sharp lyricism and refreshing nature, while others criticized its concept as confusing. Commercially, "I Forgot That You Existed" reached number 28 on the US Billboard Hot 100 and the top 40 on the national charts of Australia, Canada, and Singapore. It was certified platinum in Australia, Brazil, and New Zealand. Swift performed the track live twice on her sixth concert tour, the Eras Tour (2023–2024).

== Background and release ==
Taylor Swift conceived her seventh studio album, Lover, as a "love letter to love" that explores the different emotions stirred by love. It was influenced by the connections she experienced with her fans during her Reputation Stadium Tour (2018), which helped her recalibrate her personal life and artistic direction. Republic Records released Lover on August 23, 2019; it was Swift's first album under the label after she ended her previous contract with Big Machine Records. "I Forgot That You Existed" was released as Lover's opening track. A voice memo that contains an unfinished demo of the song, dubbed "piano/vocal", was included in the physical deluxe edition of the album.

Swift performed "I Forgot That You Existed" as a "surprise" song on acoustic guitar twice on her sixth concert tour, the Eras Tour (2023–2024). She played it for the first time at the first show in Mexico City on August 24, 2023. She performed "I Forgot That You Existed" as part of a mashup with her 2017 song "This Is Why We Can't Have Nice Things" at the Cardiff show on June 18, 2024.

== Production and composition ==
"I Forgot That You Existed" was the first track written for Lover, picked as the opening track to complete "the cycle of grieving" explored in Swift's previous album, Reputation (2017), and signify a state of indifference after the end of any cycle that involves negative emotions. She wrote and produced the track with Louis Bell and Frank Dukes, motivated by their work with Camila Cabello; she wanted the production to be as simple as the feeling of indifference itself. Bell recorded "I Forgot That You Existed" at Electric Feel Studios in Los Angeles, assisted by Grant Strumwasser. It was mixed by Serban Ghenea at Mixstar Studios in Virginia Beach, Virginia; mastered by Randy Merrill at Sterling Sound Studios in New York; programmed by Bell and Dukes; and engineered for mix by John Hanes. Musicians who played instruments for the track include Bell (keyboards), Serafin Aguilar (trumpet), David Urquidi (saxophone), and Steve Hughes (trombone); Joe Harrison and Dukes played guitar.

"I Forgot That You Existed" is 2 minutes and 50 seconds long. Music journalists identified it as a bubblegum pop, R&B, electropop and tropical house song with auto-tuned vocal performance. It features a bouncy and minimalist production consisting of light, syncopated high-pitched piano chords, "rumbling" bass, and finger snaps that accentuate the second and fourth beat of each bar to form a pop rap feel. The song incorporates themes of overcoming the past and finding peace, serving as a transition from the dark themes of Reputation. It explores the idea of creating enough distance from difficult times so they gradually fade from memory. The lyrics feature a reference to Reputation ("I forgot that you got out some popcorn as soon as my rep starting going down, down, down") and Drake's 2018 single "In My Feelings" ("In my feelings more than Drake"). Swift employs spoken word deliveries and performs a sinister laugh in the final chorus.

== Critical reception ==
Some music critics praised "I Forgot That You Existed" for its airy quality and sharp lyricism. Robert Christgau, in his "Consumer Guide" column, described the track as "mean yet hopeful", The Observer's Kitty Empire dubbed it a "breezy kiss-off", and Time's Raisa Bruner referred to it as "bright, light, and bubbly". Craig Jenkins of Vulture thought that it combined the sharp and biting lyricism of Swift's earlier songs, such as "Picture to Burn" (2008) and "Mean" (2011), with the modern production of her later works. He believed it was successful in the context of taking her music in a new direction while still maintaining a connection to her previous work. Deborah Krieger of PopMatters similarly considered it a great transition from the bitterness of Reputation to the more accepting attitude towards life and relationships of Lover. Annie Zaleski from The A.V. Club said that Swift was charmingly nonchalant as she casually sang the line "I forgot that you existed / It isn't love, it isn't hate, it's just indifference".

Other critics criticized the concept as confusing and irrelevant. NME's Nick Levine believed that Swift undermined her message by writing a song about someone she is meant to forget, and Slate's Carl Wilson deemed it a song "whose existence disproves its central claim". Miranda Wollen from Paste described the track as disappointing and remarked that it failed to showcase Swift's lyrical and musical abilities. Sal Cinquemani of Slant Magazine considered it a diss track and a toned-down version of her songs "Bad Blood" (2015) and "This Is Why We Can't Have Nice Things" (2017), and Mikael Wood of Los Angeles Times dubbed it "an unwelcome leftover from 2017's revenge-minded Reputation" and placed it at number sixteen in a ranking of Lover's eighteen tracks. Vulture's Nate Jones placed "I Forgot That You Existed" at number 81 while ranking Swift's 245 songs, and Rolling Stone's Rob Sheffield named it her 231st best song in a 2025 ranking of her discography, finding it to be closer to "reminding" than forgetting.

== Commercial performance ==
"I Forgot That You Existed" reached number three on the New Zealand Hot Singles chart and number five on the US Rolling Stone Top 100 chart. On the week ending September 7, 2019, it debuted at number 28 on the US Billboard Hot 100 and number 29 on the Canadian Hot 100. In the United Kingdom, the track peaked at number 39 on the Audio Streaming chart and number 82 on both the Singles Downloads and Singles Sales charts. "I Forgot That You Existed" additionally reached the national charts of Singapore (17), Australia (24), Sweden (50), and Scotland (71). It was certified platinum in Australia, Brazil, and New Zealand.

== Personnel ==
Credits are adapted from the liner notes of Lover.

- Taylor Swift – vocals, songwriter, producer
- Louis Bell – songwriter, producer, recording engineer, programmer, keyboards
- Frank Dukes – songwriter, producer, programmer, guitar
- Grant Strumwasser – assistant recording engineer
- Serban Ghenea – mixer
- John Hanes – engineer for mix
- Randy Merrill – mastering engineer
- Joe Harrison – guitar
- Serafin Aguilar – trumpet
- David Urquidi – saxophone
- Steve Hughes – trombone

== Charts ==
Chart performance for "I Forgot That You Existed"
Chart (2019)	Peak position
Australia (ARIA)	24
Canada Hot 100 (Billboard)	29
New Zealand Hot Singles (RMNZ)	3
Scotland Singles (Official Charts)	71
Singapore (RIAS)	17
Sweden (Sverigetopplistan)	50
UK Audio Streaming (Official Charts)	39
UK Singles Downloads (Official Charts)	82
UK Singles Sales (OCC)	82
US Billboard Hot 100	28
US Rolling Stone Top 100	5

== Certifications ==
Certifications for "I Forgot That You Existed"
Region	Certification	Certified units/sales
Australia (ARIA)	Platinum	70,000^{‡}
Brazil (Pro-Música Brasil)	Platinum	40,000^{‡}
New Zealand (RMNZ)	Platinum	30,000^{‡}
United Kingdom (BPI)	Silver	200,000^{‡}
^{‡} Sales+streaming figures based on certification alone.
