= Frank Dukes =

Canadian record producer

Adam Feeney
- Also known as: Ging fka Frank Dukes
- Born: Adam King Feeney; September 12, 1983 (age 43); Toronto, Ontario, Canada
- Genres: Hip-hop; R&B; pop
- Occupations: Record producer; songwriter; disc jockey
- Years active: 2000–2021 (as Frank Dukes); 2021–present (as Ging)
- Label: Sony Publishing
- Website: kingswaymusiclibrary.com ghostoffrankdukes.com

Adam King Feeney (born September 12, 1983), better known as Ging and by his former stage name Frank Dukes, is a Canadian record producer. He has worked with artists including Lorde, Camila Cabello, Post Malone, and The Weeknd. Following a two decade production career, he retired as Frank Dukes in 2021 to pursue his own music and art as Ging; he released his debut solo album We're Here, My Dear in 2022.

In his early career, Feeney established himself as a producer by working with a number of members of Wu-Tang Clan and G-Unit as well as young Toronto talent like BadBadNotGood. He came to prominence in the 2010s as a composer and beatmaker whose work was utilized by prominent record producers to sample in their own productions; many of his samples have been used in songs for major artists including Drake (with Feeneys' major placement, "0 to 100"), Travis Scott, Taylor Swift, and Kanye West, with some drawing from the Kingsway Music Library, a popular sample library which he has run since 2011. Dukes has been awarded Songwriter of the Year by SOCAN four times and has received similar honors from BMI, the Juno Awards, Variety, and Jaxsta.

== Early life ==
Adam King Feeney was born on September 12, 1983, in Toronto, Ontario, Canada, and was raised in the city's northern suburb of Thornhill. His first exposure to creating music was piano lessons at age five; however, he quit lessons after three years due to losing interest in it. He later taught himself to play guitar, bass and drums.

As a teenager, he spent a lot of time skateboarding and gained more interest in music, particularly New York hip-hop, becoming a DJ at 14 years old. In 1999, at age 16, Feeney began collecting records from the 1960s and 1970s in an effort to understand how they were made. This habit got him into record production and he bought an MPC the following year. He graduated from St. Robert Catholic High School in Thornhill in 2001. Feeney has stated that he had no intention to make music his profession.

== Career ==
=== 2000s: Early career and first placements ===
Feeney began producing music seriously in the early 2000s. He chose the stage name Frank Dukes as a teenager, inspired by the character of Frank Dux in the martial arts film Bloodsport, and competed in a number of local DJ contents. His first production credit was a 2003 remix for Philadelphia rapper Hezekiah and he later had his first paid placement with a Toronto artist named General Too Smooth.

In 2005, he connected with Toronto-based music manager Mo' Jointz who found Duke placements with Toronto and New York-area hip-hop artists, including Slaughterhouse's Joell Ortiz, Kool G Rap, and Choclair. Feeney was one of the first producers to work with Drake, producing the track "Money" off his debut mixtape Room for Improvement, released in 2006. Feeney's relationship with producer Boi-1da, who would become one of the in-house producers for Drake's OVO Sound label, has led to many collaborations for Drake since this time.

In 2008 and 2009, he took part in the Red Bull Big Tune producer competition; at these events, he connected with a number of artists and their A&R, most notably G-Unit, Danny Brown, and Wu-Tang Clan's Ghostface Killah. In the late 2000s, Feeney would produce a number of tracks for G-Unit rappers Lloyd Banks and 50 Cent. This included his first paid placement for a major artist, the song "Sooner or Later (Die 1 Day)" on Banks' third studio album H.F.M. 2 (The Hunger for More 2), for which Feeney was $5,000 paid in 2008, among other tracks released years later.

=== 2010s: Sample innovator and acclaim ===
Creative relationships and album production

At the end of the 2000s, Feeney connected with Wu-Tang member Ghostface Killah, producing three tracks for his 2010 album Apollo Kids. The two met after Feeney won the Red Bull Big Tune championship in 2009; Feeney had also given Ghost a beat tape the previous year. Feeney performed as his and Cappadonna's tour DJ; active as a DJ in Toronto, Feeney also played sets during their tour as well as at the 2010 CMJ Music Marathon in New York City.

This relationship led to a series of Wu-Tang-related collaborations over the following five years, including producing more than half the tracks for the RZA-produced The Man with the Iron Fists album in 2012. He also worked on his own unreleased album, collaborating with Danny Brown and Willie the Kid, among others. During the same period, Feeney met the Canadian hip-hop and jazz group BadBadNotGood at their first live show in 2011. Feeney and the group became close collaborators, even sharing a studio for many years; the band members play on many of the samples Feeney produced during the decade and, in turn, Feeney produced their first original album III, released in 2014. Feeney' work with Ghostface and BBNG culminated in their shared 2015 record, Sour Soul.

Kingsway Music Library and sample composition

During the first half of the decade, Feeney began writing music that he could use and manipulate as samples in his own work, much like the traditional record sampling he took part in as a hip-hop producer. Inspired in part by his experiences working in 2010/2011 with the Menahan Street Band, a contemporary funk and soul ensemble that employ vintage recording techniques (and achieve the 1960s/1970s sound and style so often sought after in hip-hop samples), Feeney began recording his compositions similarly, using vintage and analog equipment. Observing the sample clearance issues and poor royalty splits he experienced while working with 50 Cent and Ghostface, Feeney had the idea of using his body of work as samples for other record producers to use, much like the traditional library music model, and began sharing his work with the likes of Vinylz, DJ Dahi, and Boi-1da; beginning in 2013, he packaged a portion of his compositions into various volumes for a collection titled Kingsway Music Library which he sells with the clearance of his samples guaranteed.

This sample production work created acclaim for Feeney in 2014 when a composition he wrote was given to Boi-1da and flipped into the Drake single "0 to 100." From this point forward, he was inspired to grow Kingsway Music Library into an established platform for original music for sampling. He continues to distribute a limited amount of his music this way and invites up-and-coming musicians to collaborate or contribute whole volumes to his platform. In 2019, he spearheaded a collaboration between Kingsway Music Library and Toronto's Regent Park School of Music. Called Parkscapes, all tracks are performed by students of the music program, and all proceeds, including licensing and royalty payments, help fund the school's programs. As of 2021, Feeney has personally released fifteen volumes of music through Kingsway.

His compositions, including those designated for Kingsway Music, have led to him working with record producers such as Boi-1da, Metro Boomin, Vinylz, DJ Dahi, and more, landing him prominent placements for Kanye West, Mac Miller, Drake, Eminem, Jeremih, Tory Lanez and Rihanna, among others.

Hitmaker

Feeney began growing in notability in 2013/2014 and started working more often with major artists in the studio. He met producer Louis Bell and Post Malone in 2015–2016 and worked on tracks for Post Malone's debut album Stoney (including "Congratulations"); Feeney also worked extensively on Post's 2019 album Hollywood's Bleeding. In 2017, he produced a string of singles for Frank Ocean and Blonded Radio ("Chanel", "Biking", "Lens").

In 2018, three albums that Feeney executive produced were released: the debut solo album of frequent collaborator Matty from BadBadNotGood; The Weeknd's My Dear Melancholy EP, which included the single "Call Out My Name"; and Camila Cabello's debut album Camila. Feeney met Cabello in November 2016, beginning what would be her debut album. Notably, he produced her wildly successful single "Havana." During this period until around 2020, he was represented by Electric Feel Management.

In total, Feeney was a credited producer or songwriter on over 300 tracks during the decade, including multiple tracks for artists Mac Miller, Amine, Drake, Lorde, and Travis Scott, among others. By the end of the decade, he was generally considered one of the top producers/songwriters; he was also named or nominated as Songwriter of the Year by multiple music industry organizations including BMI, SOCAN, the Juno Awards, and the iHeartRadio Music Awards.

=== 2020s: New ventures as Ging ===
Into the 2020s, Feeney continued to work with artists like Rosalía and The Weeknd in addition to producing a number of tracks for Don Toliver and Shawn Mendes. Throughout 2020, he worked with Canadian artist Mustafa (who had previously co-written a number of pop hits with Feeney) on his debut album When Smoke Rises, released May 2021; the album was short-listed for Canada's 2021 Polaris Music Prize. His collaborations with Rosalía were released in March 2022 on her album Motomami. In March 2022, he was named the world's fifth most successful producer by Jaxsta, which considered a number of factors in their metric for the previous twelve months. He followed Jack Antonoff, Louis Bell, Mike Dean, and Finneas.

In September 2021, he partnered with Tracklib on which he distributes hundreds of masters and stems. The following month, Feeney announced The Prince, a signature synths plug-in, created with the software company Cradle.

On November 16, 2021, Feeney released his beat tape The Way of Ging. The album was released as NFTs and available to stream on SoundCloud for one week; it was later released on streaming services. Three days later, he announced his retirement as Frank Feeney on social media. He indicated that he would continue working on new music projects under the name of Ging (a variation of his middle name King). Since that time, he has released generative music and art and has been vocal about artistic innovation like the use of Web3. In 2022, he began releasing and performing his original studio music.

His debut album We're Here, My Dear was released in November 2022.

== Style ==
During his early career, Feeney worked within the East Coast hip-hop and boom bap sound, with some contemporary and progressive influences. In the early 2010s, he embraced a more retro analog sound which has since evolved into his oft-imitated eclectic and effects-heavy style. SPIN noted that Feeney' production aesthetic is informed by 'shimmering pop nostalgia' and the 'luxurious hollows' of the New Toronto sound and inspired by disparate genres. On his writing style, Ryan Tedder observed, "Frank Feeney likes weird chord progressions. He doesn't like anything to sound clean or normal."

Feeney is known for achieving his sound through live instrumentation and analog equipment. To achieve this, he often collaborates with an informal group of Toronto-based musicians and songwriters which includes Mustafa Ahmed, Kaan Güneşberk, and the members of instrumental group BadBadNotGood; Feeney and the band shared an analog recording studio in Toronto for much of the 2010s. At times, he has also written music for other artists with fellow Torontonians Daniel Caesar, River Tiber, and Charlotte Day Wilson, as well as with New York-based retro-soul musicians Thomas Brenneck and Homer Steinwiess; of note, Feeney and Steinweiss formed a short-lived production duo under the name Silver & Gold and worked with a number of New York soul and funk artists in the early 2010s. Outside of this group, Feeney has frequently collaborated with producers Louis Bell, Boi-1da, Vinylz, and Metro Boomin, among others.

== Personal life ==
Feeney has two sons. He resides in Los Angeles, California, having moved from Mississauga, Ontario.

== Discography ==
- We're Here, My Dear (2022)

=== Notable production credits ===
Singles certified RIAA Platinum

- Drake – "0 to 100 / The Catch Up" (2014)
- Jeremih – "Planez" feat. J. Cole (2015)
- Drake & Future – "Diamonds Dancing" (2015)
- Drake – "10 Bands" (2015)
- Drake – "Right Hand" (2015)
- Rihanna – "Needed Me" (2016)
- Kanye West – "Real Friends" (2016)
- J. Cole – "Immortal" (2016)
- Drake – "Pop Style" (2016)
- Young Thug & Travis Scott – "Pick Up the Phone" (2016)
- Post Malone – "Deja Vu" feat. Justin Bieber (2016)
- Post Malone – "Congratulations" (2016)
- Drake – "Fake Love" (2016)
- Frank Ocean – "Chanel" (2017)
- Drake – "Blem" (2017)
- Lorde – "Green Light"
- Lorde –"Homemade Dynamite" (Remix) feat. Khalid, Post Malone and SZA (2017)
- Romeo Santos – "Imitadora" (2017)
- Camila Cabello – "Havana" (2017)
- Camila Cabello – "Never Be the Same" (2017)
- Kendrick Lamar & The Weeknd – "Pray for Me" (2017)
- Cardi B – "Be Careful" (2018)
- The Weeknd – "Call Out My Name" (2018)
- The Weeknd – "Wasted Times" (2018)
- Rich the Kid – "Splashin" (2018)
- Post Malone – "Better Now" (2018)
- Post Malone – "Spoil My Night" feat. Swae Lee (2018)
- Post Malone – "Rich & Sad" (2018)
- Post Malone – "Wow" (2018)
- Post Malone – "Circles" (2019)
- Rosalía & J Balvin – "Con Altura" feat. El Guincho (2019)
- Jonas Brothers – "Sucker" (2019)
- Ramage – "Ya Lil" feat. Nicki Minaj (2019)
- Taylor Swift - “I Forgot That You Existed” (2019)
- Camila Cabello – "My Oh My" feat. DaBaby (2020)

Albums executive produced

- BadBadNotGood – III (2014)
- BadBadNotGood & Ghostface Killah – Sour Soul (2015)
- Camila Cabello – Camila (2018); peaked at No. 1 (US Billboard 200)
- The Weeknd – My Dear Melancholy (2018); peaked at No. 1 (US Billboard 200)
- Matty (of BadBadNotGood) – Déjàvu (2018)
- Mustafa – When Smoke Rises (2021)

== Awards and nominations ==
=== ASCAP Awards ===
ASCAP hosts a series of annual awards which honor achievement in American songwriting, composition, and publishing. Feeney has received honors at ASCAP's Pop Music, Latin, and Rhythm & Soul Awards ceremonies.

Year	Ceremony	Category	Work	Result	Ref(s)
2015	Rhythm & Soul Awards	Award Winning R&B/Hip-Hop Songs	"0 to 100 / The Catch Up" (Drake)	Won	
2016	Rhythm & Soul Awards	Award Winning R&B/Hip-Hop Songs	"Planez" (Jeremih Featuring J. Cole)	Won	
2017	Pop Music Awards	Award Winning Songs	"Needed Me" (Rihanna)	Won	
2017	Rhythm & Soul Awards	Top R&B/Hip-Hop Song	"Needed Me" (Rihanna)	Won	
2018	Rhythm & Soul Awards	Award Winning R&B/Hip-Hop Songs	"Needed Me" (Rihanna)	Won	
2018	Rhythm & Soul Awards	Award Winning R&B/Hip-Hop Songs	"Sex with Me" (Rihanna)	Won	
2018	Rhythm & Soul Awards	Award Winning R&B/Hip-Hop Songs	"Fake Love" (Drake)	Won	
2018	Rhythm & Soul Awards	Award Winning Rap Songs	"Fake Love" (Drake)	Won	
2018	Pop Music Awards	Award Winning Songs	"Fake Love" (Drake)	Won	
2019	Rhythm & Soul Awards	Award Winning R&B/Hip-Hop Songs	"Broken Clocks" (SZA)	Won	
2020	Latin Music Awards	Award Winning Songs	"Yo X Ti, Tú X Mi" (Rosalía)	Won	

=== BMI Awards ===
BMI hosts a series of annual awards which honor achievements by songwriters, composers, and publishers, based on tracks performance time. Feeney has received honors at ASCAP's Pop, R&B/Hip-Hop, and London Awards ceremonies.

Year	Ceremony	Category	Work	Result	Ref(s)
2018	R&B/Hip-Hop Awards	Award Winning Songs	"Congratulations" (Post Malone)	Won	
2019	Pop Awards	Songwriter of the Year (Note: Shared four ways)		Won	
2019	Pop Awards	Award Winning Songs	"Havana" (Camila Cabello)	Won	
2019	Pop Awards	Award Winning Songs	"Never Be the Same" (Camila Cabello)	Won	
2019	Pop Awards	Award Winning Songs	"Better Now" (Post Malone)	Won	
2019	R&B/Hip-Hop Awards	Award Winning Songs	"Better Now" (Post Malone)	Won	
2019	R&B/Hip-Hop Awards	Award Winning Songs	"Be Careful" (Cardi B)	Won	
2019	R&B/Hip-Hop Awards	Award Winning Songs	"Pray for Me" (The Weeknd & Kendrick Lamar)	Won	
2020	Pop Awards	Award Winning Songs	"Sucker" (Jonas Brothers)	Won	
2020	Pop Awards	Award Winning Songs	"Wow" (Post Malone)	Won	
2020	R&B/Hip-Hop Awards	Award Winning Songs	"Wow" (Post Malone)	Won	
2020	London Awards	Award Winning Songs	"Never Be the Same" (Camila Cabello)	Won	
2020	London Awards	Song of the Year	"Never Be the Same" (Camila Cabello)	Won	
2021	Latin Awards	Most-Performed Songs	"Con Altura" (Rosalía & J Balvin)	Won	
2021	Latin Awards	Most-Performed Songs	"Yo X Ti, Tu X Mi" (Rosalía & Ozuna)	Won	
2021	Pop Awards	Most-Performed Songs	"My Oh My" (Camila Cabello feat. DaBaby)	Won	

=== Grammy Awards ===
Feeney' work has been included in the Grammy Award nominations every year since 2015. From 32 nominations, he has won four awards; all of his wins are for track production credits on an awarded album. The following works are for his role as producer unless otherwise noted.

Year	Category	Nominated Work	Result	Notes	Ref(s)
2015	Best Rap Album	The Marshall Mathers LP 2 (Eminem)	Won	Produced "Groundhog Day"^{[a]}	
2015	Best Rap Album	Oxymoron (Schoolboy Q)	Nominated	Co-produced "Grooveline Pt. 2"^{[a]}	
2015	Best Rap Song	"0 to 100 / The Catch Up" (Drake)	Nominated	Producer	
2015	Best Rap Performance	"0 to 100 / The Catch Up" (Drake)	Nominated	Producer^{[a]}	
2016	Best Rap Album	If You're Reading This It's Too Late (Drake)	Nominated	Produced 3 tracks^{[a]}	
2016	Best R&B Performance	"Planez" (Jeremih)	Nominated	Producer^{[a]}	
2017	Album of the Year	Views (Drake)	Nominated	Produced track "Pop Style"^{[a]}	
2017	Best Rap Album	Views (Drake)	Nominated	Produced track "Pop Style"^{[a]}	
2017	Best Rap Album	The Life of Pablo (Kanye West)	Nominated	Produced track "Real Friends"^{[a]}	
2017	Best Rap Album	Major Key (DJ Khaled)	Nominated	Produced track "Work For It"^{[a]}	
2017	Best Rap Album	Blank Face LP (Schoolboy Q)	Nominated	Produced track "Overtime"	
2017	Best Urban Contemporary Album	ANTI (Rihanna)	Nominated	Produced 2 tracks^{[a]}	
2017	Best Rap Performance	"Pop Style" (Drake)	Nominated	Producer^{[a]}	
2018	Album of the Year	Melodrama (Lorde)	Nominated	Produced 5 tracks^{[a]}	
2018	Best Urban Contemporary Album	Starboy (The Weeknd)	Won	Produced track "Attention"^{[a]}	
2019	Album of the Year	Beerbongs & Bentleys (Post Malone)	Nominated	Produced 3 tracks^{[a]}	
2019	Album of the Year	Black Panther	Nominated	Produced 2 tracks^{[a]}	
2019	Album of the Year	Invasion of Privacy (Cardi B)	Nominated	Produced track "Be Careful"^{[a]}	
2019	Best Rap Album	Invasion of Privacy (Cardi B)	Won	Produced track "Be Careful"^{[a]}	
2019	Best Rap Album	Astroworld (Travis Scott)	Nominated	Produced 3 tracks	
2019	Best Pop Vocal Album	Camila (Camila Cabello)	Nominated	Album producer	
2019	Best Pop Solo Performance	"Havana (Live)" (Camila Cabello)	Nominated	Producer^{[a]}	
2019	Best Pop Solo Performance	"Better Now" (Post Malone)	Nominated	Producer^{[a]}	
2019	Best Rap Performance	"Be Careful" (Cardi B)	Nominated	Producer^{[a]}	
2020	Best Pop Vocal Album	Lover (Taylor Swift)	Nominated	Produced 3 tracks^{[a]}	
2020	Best Pop Duo/Group Performance	"Sucker" (Jonas Brothers)	Nominated	Producer^{[a]}	
2021	Album of the Year	Hollywood's Bleeding (Post Malone)	Nominated	Album producer, songwriter	
2021	Song of the Year	"Circles" (Post Malone)	Nominated	Songwriter	
2021	Record of the Year	"Circles" (Post Malone)	Nominated	Producer	
2022	Best Rap Album	The Off-Season (J. Cole)	Nominated	Produced track "Let Go My Hand"	
2023	Best Reggae Album	Gifted (Koffee)	Nominated	Produced track "Gifted"	
2023	Best Latin Rock or Alternative Album	Motomami (Rosalía)	Won	Produced 4 tracks	

^{^[a]}Grammy Certificate-eligible contributions as per award category specifications on contribution playing time.

=== iHeartRadio Music Awards ===
The iHeartRadio Music Awards is an annual awards that honors music played across American radio.

Year	Category	Work	Result	Notes	Ref(s)
2019	Producer of the Year		Nominated		
2019	Songwriter of the Year		Won		
2020	Songwriter of the Year		Nominated		
2021	Producer of the Year		Nominated		

=== Juno Awards ===
The Juno Awards are Canada's most popular music industry awards. As per Juno regulations, performing producers and songwriters do not receive honors for their nominated work. As such, Feeney has one nomination.

Year	Category	Work	Result	Notes	Ref(s)
2019	Songwriter of the Year		Nominated	"Be Careful", "Better Now", "Call Out My Name"	

=== Latin Grammy Awards ===
Feeney has received six nominations and three awards at the Latin Grammy Awards.

Year	Category	Work	Result	Notes	Ref(s)
2018	Best Contemporary Tropical Album	Golden (Romeo Santos)	Nominated	Produced "Imitadora"^{[a]}	
2019	Best Urban Song	"Con Altura" (Rosalía & J Balvin)	Won	Songwriter	
2020	Best Pop/Rock Song	"Dolerme" (Rosalía)	Nominated	Songwriter	
2022	Record of the Year	"La Fama" (Rosalía feat. The Weeknd)	Nominated	Producer	
2022	Album of the Year	Motomami (Rosalía)	Won	Producer and songwriter	
2022	Best Alternative Music Album	Motomami (Rosalía)	Won	Producer and songwriter	

=== Red Bull Big Tune ===
The Red Bull Big Tune competition is an annual series in which hip-hop producers battle head-to-head, much like DJ competitions. Feeney competed from 2007 to 2009, at which point he was crowned the national champion.

- 2008: Red Bull Big Tune – Detroit Runner Up
- 2008: Red Bull Big Tune Finals Runner Up
- 2009: Red Bull Big Tune – Detroit Runner Up
- 2009: Red Bull Big Tune Finals Champion

=== SOCAN Awards ===
The SOCAN Awards are Canadian music industry awards, honoring achievement of its members in songwriting, composing, and publishing. Feeney has thrice been awarded Songwriter of the Year.

Year	Category	Nominated Work	Result	Ref(s)
2018	Songwriter of the Year – Producer		Won	
2018	Rap Music Awards	"Fake Love" (Drake)	Won	
2018	Rap Music Awards	"Congratulations" (Post Malone)	Won	
2018	Pop Music Awards	"Havana" (Camila Cabello)	Won	
2019	Songwriter of the Year – Producer		Won	
2019	Pop Music Awards	"Better Now" (Post Malone)	Won	
2019	Pop Music Awards	"Pray for Me" (The Weeknd & Kendrick Lamar)	Won	
2020	Songwriter of the Year – Producer		Won	
2020	Pop Music Awards	"Sucker" (Jonas Brothers)	Won	
2020	Pop Music Awards	"Wow" (Post Malone)	Won	
2021	Songwriter of the Year – Producer		Won	
2021	Pop Music Awards	"My Oh My" (Camila Cabello feat. DaBaby)	Won	
2021	Pop Music Awards	"Monster" (Shawn Mendes & Justin Bieber)	Won	

=== Other accolades ===
Year	Ceremony	Category	Work	Result	Ref(s)
2016	Soul Train Music Awards	The Ashford And Simpson Songwriter's Award	"Needed Me" (Rihanna)	Nominated	
2017	Spotify's Secret Genius Awards	Secret Genius: Hip-Hop (Note: Considered works: "Fake Love", "Congratulations")	Himself	Nominated	
2018	Spotify's Secret Genius Awards	Producer of the Year (Note: Considered works: "Havana", "Never Be the Same", "Better Now")	Himself	Nominated	
2018	Spotify's Secret Genius Awards	Secret Genius: Social Message	"Pray For Me" (The Weeknd & Kendrick Lamar)	Nominated	
2018	Soul Train Music Awards	The Ashford And Simpson Songwriter's Award	"Broken Clocks" (SZA)	Nominated	
2018	Black Reel Awards	Best Original or Adapted Song	"Pray for Me" (Black Panther)	Nominated	
2018	Variety's Hitmakers	Producer-Songwriter	Himself	Won	
2019	APRA Awards	International Work of the Year	"Havana" (Camila Cabello)	Nominated	
2019	Variety's Hitmakers	Producer-Songwriter	Himself	Won	
2022	The Jaxsta Honors List	World's Most Successful Producers	Himself	5th	
