= Jarren Benton discography =

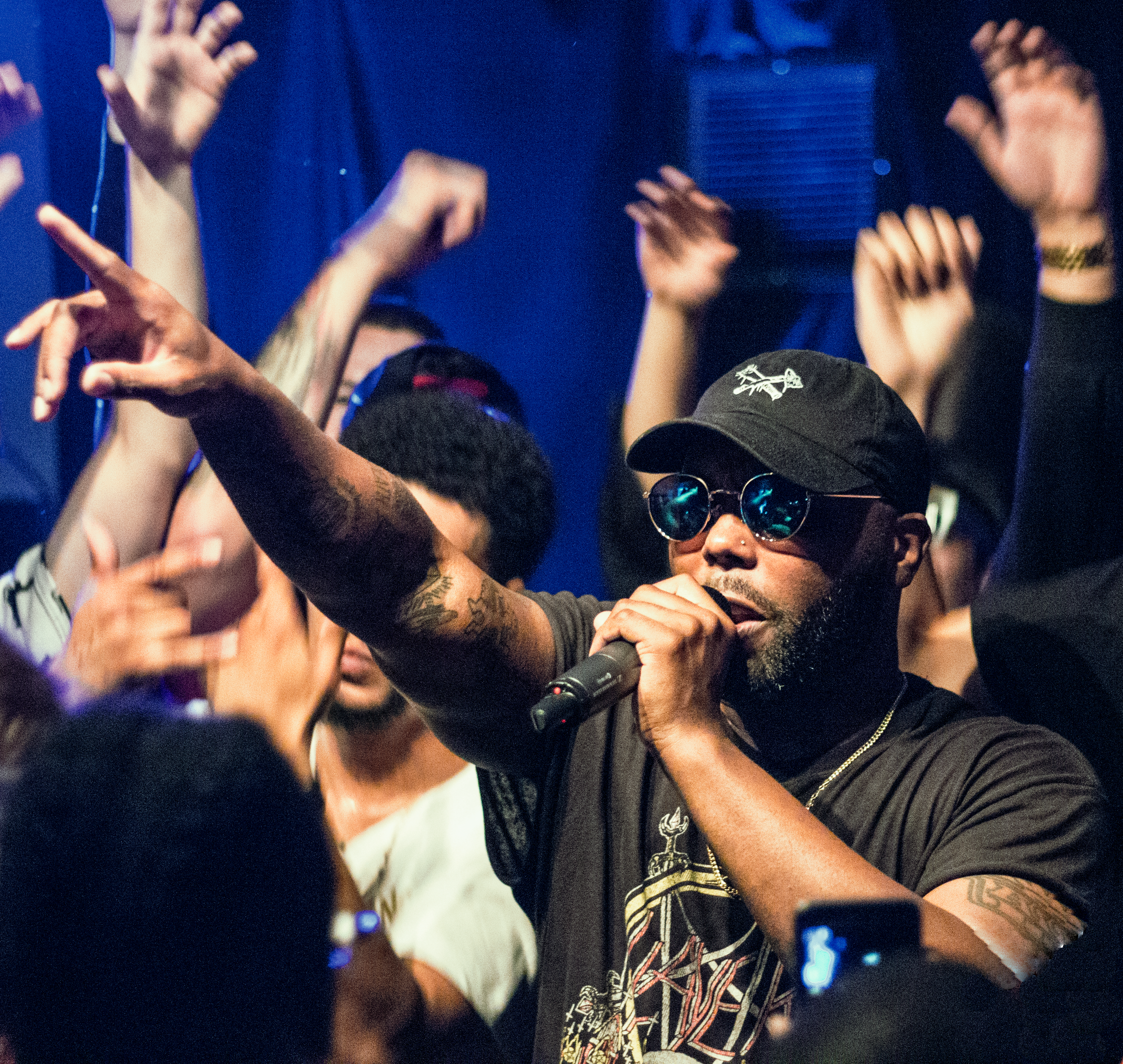
- Benton performing in June 2017
- Studio albums: 4
- EPs: 2
- Singles: 62
- Collaborative albums: 1
- Mixtapes: 3

The discography of American rapper and songwriter Jarren Benton consists of four studio albums, one collaboration album, three mixtapes, two extended plays and 62 singles (including 28 singles as a featured artist).

== Albums ==
=== Studio albums ===
List of studio albums, with selected chart positions and details
Title	Album details	Peak chart positions			
Title	Album details	US	US Heat	US R&B/HH	US Rap
My Grandma's Basement	Released: June 11, 2013; Label: Funk Volume; Format: CD, digital download	152	4	16	12
Slow Motion Vol. 2	Released: July 22, 2016; Label: Benton Enterprises; Formats: CD, digital download	—	20	43	—
The Mink Coat Killa	Released: June 23, 2017; Label: Benton Enterprises; Formats: CD, digital download	—	—	—	—
Yuck Fou	Released: July 27, 2018; Label: Roc Nation; Formats: CD, digital download	—	—	—	—

=== Collaborative albums ===
List of collaborative studio albums, with selected details
Title	Album details
One Week Notice (as part of One Week Notice)	Released: January 5, 2018; Label: StillMovin; Formats: digital download

=== Mixtapes ===
List of mixtapes, with selected details
Title	Mixtape details
The Beatgods Present... Jarren Benton: The Mixtape	Released: August 5, 2009; Label: Self-released; Formats: Digital download
Huffing Glue with Hasselhoff	Released: January 25, 2011; Label: Self-released; Formats: Digital download
Freebasing with Kevin Bacon	Released: June 28, 2012; Label: Funk Volume; Formats: Digital download

== Extended plays ==
List of extended plays, with selected chart positions and details
Title	Album details	Peak chart positions			
Title	Album details	US	US Heat	US R&B/HH	US Rap
Slow Motion	Released: January 27, 2015; Label: Funk Volume, Warner Records; Format: CD, digital download	168	1	15	10
The Mink Coat Killa (The Lost 4)	Released: May 1, 2020; Label: Benton Enterprises; Format: Digital download, streaming	—	—	—	—

== Singles ==
=== As lead artist ===
List of singles as lead artist, showing year released and album name
Title	Year	Album
"Skitzo"	2011	Freebasing With Kevin Bacon
"Funk Volume 2013" (with Hopsin, Dizzy Wright, DJ Hoppa and SwizZz)	2013	Non-album single
"Razor Blades and Steak Knives" (featuring Hemi)	2013	My Grandma's Basement
"Gimmie the Loot"	2014	Non-album single
"Plan A" (with Futuristic and Chris Webby)	2014	Traveling Local
"Free Meal" (with Hopsin and Dizzy Wright)	2015	Non-album single
"Anarchy" (featuring EarthGang)	2016	Slow Motion Vol. 2
"Tec In The Church" (featuring Locksmith and Joyner Lucas)	2016	Slow Motion Vol. 2
"Scared" (featuring OnCue and Big Rube)	2016	Slow Motion Vol. 2
"C.R.E.A.M. '17" (featuring Nick Grant)	2017	The Mink Coat Killa
"Again" (featuring Aleon Craft)	2017	The Mink Coat Killa
"Money Bag" (with Kato or Jay Park)	2017	Yuck Fou
"Used To" (with Emilio Rojas and Rexx Life Raj)	2018	Non-album single
"Don't Need You" (featuring Hopsin)	2018	Yuck Fou
"Bang on Em" (with Aaron Cohen)	2019	Raw Every Day
"Yeezy 350" (with Aaron Cohen)	2019	Raw Every Day
"Easy" (with Bobby Saint and Emilio Rojas)	2019	Non-album singles
"Let Em Know" (with Mark Battles and Trizz)	2019	Non-album singles
"Wasabi" (featuring J Plaza)	2019	Non-album singles
"Holy Water"	2020	Non-album singles
"Die a Legend" (featuring Coolassppl)	2020	Non-album singles
"Origami" (with Okay! Kenji)	2020	Non-album singles
"Church"	2020	Non-album singles
"The Old Me" (featuring Shaolin G)	2020	Non-album singles
"No X's & O's"	2020	Non-album singles
"Burn It Down" (with DJ Hoppa featuring Demrick)	2020	Non-album singles
"Savage in the Sanctuary" (with SwizZz)	2020	Non-album singles
"Kilos" (with GAWNE)	2020	Non-album singles
"Disobey" (with Dizzy Wright)	2020	Non-album singles
"Watermelon Fried Chicken" (featuring Elz Jenkins and Oba Rowland)	2020	Non-album singles
"Black Rob"	2020	Non-album singles
"Andre 3K's"	2020	Non-album singles
"Snakes in the Yard"	2020	Non-album singles
"As You Are"	2020	Non-album singles

=== As featured artist ===
List of singles as a featured artist, showing year released and album name
Title	Year	Album
"This Is Hip Hop (Like Yeah)" (DJ Eddie F and Erick Sermon featuring Jarren Benton)	2009	Non-album singles
"Ham!" (Kato on the Track featuring Jarren Benton, Spittzwell and 4-IZE)	2010	Non-album singles
"Don't Mind If I Do" (Futuristic featuring Dizzy Wright and Jarren Benton)	2012	Chasing Down a Dream
"M.C.C.H." (Kato on the Track featuring Jarren Benton)	2013	Non-album singles
"Underground Hits (Remix)" (R.A. the Rugged Man featuring Hopsin and Jarren Benton)	2013	Non-album singles
"Independent" (Big Boyz featuring Jarren Benton and Stevie Stone)	2013	#Subfu
"Let Me in the Game" (Futuristic featuring Jarren Benton, Irv da Phenom and VI Seconds)	2013	Non-album singles
"Nada" (Sho Beaz featuring Stevie Stone, Jarren Benton, Ces Cru and Kato)	2013	Non-album singles
"No Idea" (Nappy Roots featuring Jarren Benton)	2014	Non-album singles
"Drunk Drivin'" (Big J featuring Jarren Benton)	2015	Non-album singles
"No Chill" (Tunk featuring Jarren Benton and DrazaH Backwards)	2015	Non-album singles
"Hustler's Insomnia" (The Kid featuring Jarren Benton)	2015	Non-album singles
"Tazer" (Lexa Terrestrial featuring Jarren Benton)	2016	LeX-Files
"One Mo' Gain" (Kato on the Track featuring Jack Harlow, Smoov Wooz and Jarren Benton)	2016	Non-album Singles
"Suicide Squade" (Chris Webby featuring Locksmith and Jarren Benton)	2016	Non-album Singles
"Up to No Good" (Mike Bars featuring Jarren Benton)	2016	Desperate Measures
"Up to No Good" (Chris Webby featuring Jarren Benton)	2016	Non-album singles
"End Game" (Kydd featuring Jarren Benton)	2017	Non-album singles
"What They Say" (Sonny Bamboo featuring Jarren Benton)	2018	Vida
"Jiu Jitsu" (Elz Jenkins featuring Jarren Benton and Reese LaFlare)	2018	Non-album singles
"I Will, Pt. 2" (Oba Rowland featuring Jarren Benton)	2018	Non-album singles
"Elm Street" (Goldyard featuring Fabo, Jarren Benton and Frko)	2019	Non-album singles
"Mayhem" (VonSavage featuring Jarren Benton, Stevee Hutch and King Pete)	2019	Non-album singles
"Shapeshift" (Aaron Cohen featuring Jarren Benton)	2019	Raw Every Day
"Know My Name" (Psychon featuring Jarren Benton)	2019	Non-album singles
"Nerd Sandwich" (Comic Book Killaz featuring Jarren Benton)	2019	Non-album singles
"100 Bills" (J.M.P featuring Jarren Benton)	2020	Non-album singles
^{"Be Here"}^{(David Jax Featuring Jarren Benton)}	2021	Be Careful What You Wish For

== Guest appearances ==
List of non-single guest appearances, with other performing artists, showing year released and album name
Title	Year	Other artist(s)	Album
"Hotel Stripper"	2012	Dizzy Wright	The First Agreement
"Shotgun Kisses"	2012	Dizzy Wright, Irv da Phenom	The First Agreement
"Y.B.W. (Young Black and Winning)" (Remix)	2013	Irv da Phenom, Dizzy Wright	Los Kangeles LP
"1 O'Clock Jump"	2013	Stevie Stone	2 Birds 1 Stone
"Step Yo Game Up"	2013	Dizzy Wright, Tory Lanez	The Golden Age
"Insanity"	2013	Kasland	Devil's Delight
"YDGI"	2013	verbal PHANTOM	THEO
"Meditation Obliteration"	2013	Bloodstepp	Bass and Bubblegum
"Who's There"	2013	Hopsin, Dizzy Wright	Knock Madness
"Get Your Weight Up"	2014	Goldyard	Fuck Culture E.P.
"Meditation Obliteration (Bent(on) Destruction Remix)"	2014	Bloodstepp, KD The Stranger	Grand Theft Ufo: Floppy Disk Edition
"Hundred Percent Legit (Gmix)"	2014	Knifer, WC	Hundred Percent Legit (Gmix)
"Rage"	2014	The Dillinger Escape Plan	Converse CONS Compilation - CONS EP Vol. 2
"Ohh Noo"	2014	Chris Webby, Tech N9ne	Chemically Imbalanced
"Don't Know"	2014	Jon Dubb	The Leilana May Project
"Explain Myself"	2015	Dizzy Wright, SwizZz, Hopsin	The Growing Process
"Ramona"	2015	Hopsin	Pound Syndrome
"Jack Move"	2015	Erick Sermon	E.S.P. (Erick Sermon's Perception)
"Joe Jackson / Consigliere"	2015	Twisted Insane	Voodoo
"Flags Fly High"	2015	Serial Killers	The Murder Show
"Infamous"	2016	CHVSE	Mind Over Matter
"Outta My Brain"	2016	Bernz	See You On The Other Side
"Bulletproof"	2016	Wax, Sahtyre	The Cookout Chronicles
"Be Afraid"	2018	Elz Jenkins	Dealer's Day Off
"Sometimes"	2018	Chris Webby	Next Wednesday
"Keep It 100"	2019	Dizzy Wright	Nobody Cares, Work Harder
"Work of Art"	2020	Jon Connor, DJ Paul, Locksmith	S.O.S.
"Game F*cked Up"	2020	Chris Webby	28 Wednesdays Later
"Def Jam Vendetta"	2021	Chris Webby	Still Wednesday
