= Futuristic discography =

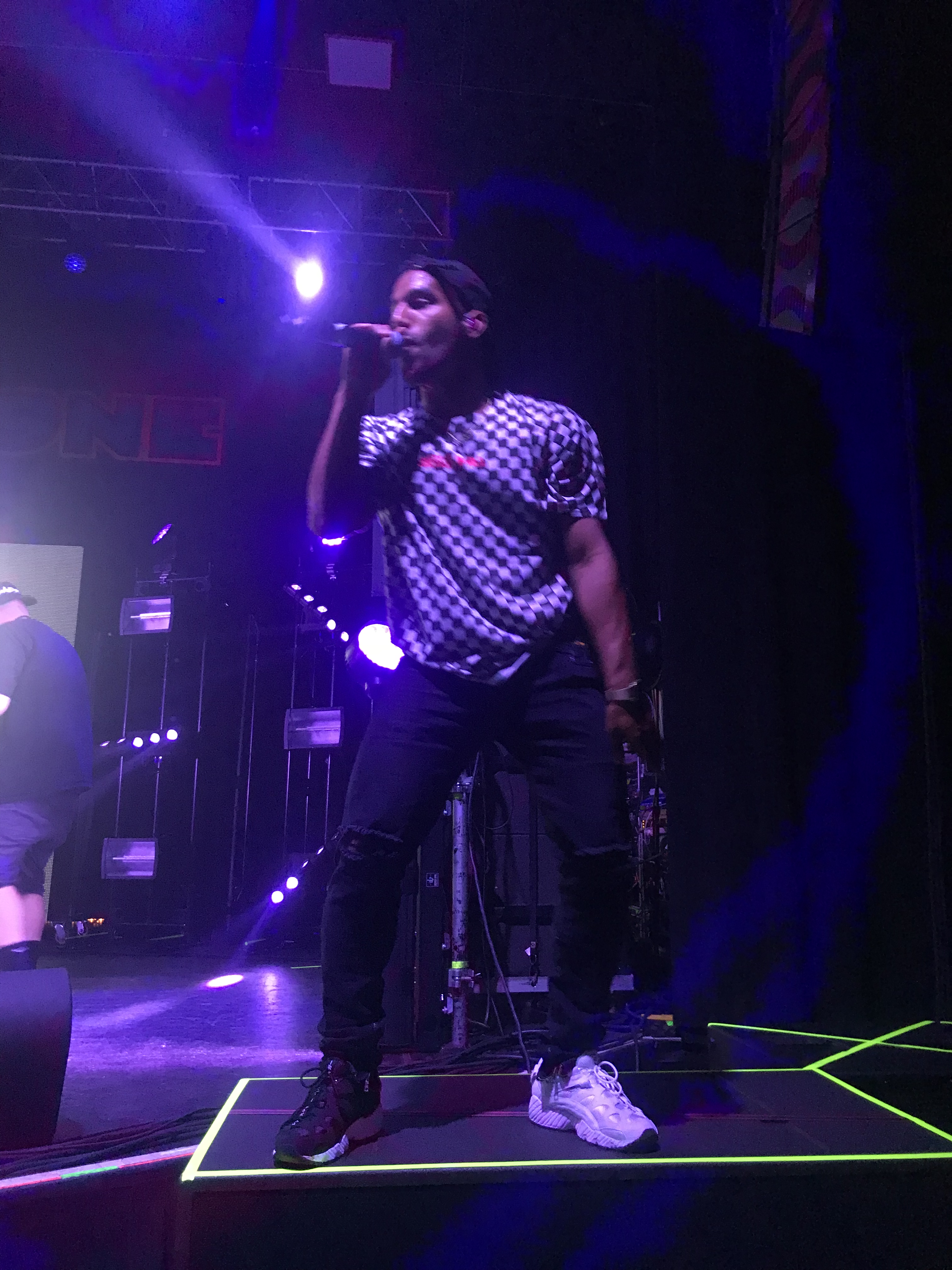
- Futuristic performing at the Independent Grind Tour in 2018
- Studio albums: 14
- EPs: 3
- Singles: 130
- Collaborative albums: 2

The discography of American rapper, singer and songwriter Futuristic consists of fourteen studio albums, two collaboration albums, three extended plays and 130 singles (including 29 singles as a featured artist).

== Albums ==
=== Studio albums ===
List of studio albums, with selected chart positions and details
Title	Album details	Peak chart positions					
Title	Album details	US	US Heat	US R&B/HH	US Rap	BEL (FL)	NZ Heat
Dream Big	Released: February 6, 2012; Label: self-released; Format: Digital download	—	—	—	—	—	—
Chasing Down a Dream	Released: February 19, 2013; Label: self-released; Formats: CD, digital download	—	—	—	—	—	—
Traveling Local	Released: June 9, 2014; Label: self-released; Formats: CD, digital download	—	—	—	—	—	—
The Rise	Released: May 12, 2015; Label: self-released; Formats: CD, digital download, streaming	139	3	13	10	—	—
As Seen on the Internet	Released: August 26, 2016; Label: self-released; Formats: CD, digital download, streaming	116	—	10	8	200	10
Blessings	Released: December 25, 2017; Label: self-released; Formats: CD, digital download, streaming	—	—	—	—	—	—
I Am...	Released: July 12, 2019; Label: self-released; Formats: CD, digital download, streaming	—	—	—	—	—	—
Zachary Lewis	Released: September 1, 2019; Label: self-released; Formats: CD, digital download, streaming	—	—	—	—	—	—
Still on the Rise	Released: May 12, 2020; Label: self-released; Formats: CD, digital download, streaming	—	—	—	—	—	—
Featuristic	Released: September 23, 2020; Label: self-released; Formats: CD, digital download, streaming	—	—	—	—	—	—
Don't Wanna Be Famous	Released: December 31, 2021; Label: self-released; Formats: CD, digital download, streaming	—	—	—	—	—	—
Never 2 Late	Released: January 20, 2023; Label: self-released; Formats: CD, digital download, streaming	—	—	—	—	—	—
We Made It	Released: May 26, 2023; Label: self-released; Formats: CD, digital download, streaming	—	—	—	—	—	—
Ikigai	Released: June 21, 2024; Label: self-released; Formats: CD, digital download, streaming	—	—	—	—	—	—
Finally Found	Released: April 18, 2025; Label: self-released; Formats: CD, digital download, streaming	—	—	—	—	—	—
"—" denotes a recording that did not chart or was not released in that territory.

=== Collaborative albums ===
List of collaborative studio albums, with selected chart positions and details
Title	Album details	Peaks		
Title	Album details	US	US R&B/HH	US Rap
Coast 2 Coast (with Devvon Terrell)	Released: December 25, 2015; Label: self-released; Formats: CD, digital download, streaming	82	12	10
I Know What You're Thinking... (with Michael Minelli)	Released: April 7, 2021; Label: self-released; Formats: CD, digital download, streaming	—	—	—

== Extended plays ==
List of extended plays, with selected details
Title	EP details
T.G.I.F	Released: September 6, 2013; Label: self-released; Format: Digital download
What More Could You Ask for?	Released: November 24, 2017; Label: self-released; Format: CD, digital download, streaming
Songs About Girls	Released: February 14, 2018; Label: self-released; Format: Digital download, streaming

== Singles ==
=== As lead artist ===
List of singles as lead artist, showing year released and album name
Title	Year	Album
"Don't Mind If I Do" (featuring Dizzy Wright and Jarren Benton)	2012	Chasing Down A Dream
"Let Me in the Game" (featuring Jarren Benton, Irv da Phenom and VI Seconds)	2013	Non-album single
"I Guess I'll Smoke" (featuring Dizzy Wright and Layzie Bone)	2014	Traveling Local
"Dirty Chucks"	2014	Traveling Local
"Plan A" (with Jarren Benton and Chris Webby)	2014	Traveling Local
"In the Zone" (featuring Collins, J Rob the Chief and Devvon Terrell)	2014	Traveling Local
"Legend in the Making"	2014	Non-album single
"No Way"	2014	The Rise
"Watch Yo Mouth" (featuring Sam Lachow)	2015	Non-album single
"The Greatest"	2015	The Rise
"Feelings and Liquor" (with Devvon Terrell, Huey Mack and Cam Meekins)	2015	Non-album singles
"Billion Dollars" (with Devvon Terrell featuring OCD: Moosh & Twist)	2015	Non-album singles
"I Want It All" (with Devvon Terrell)	2015	Coast 2 Coast
"Wassup" (featuring Beez)	2016	Non-album singles
"Back Then"	2016	Non-album singles
"All I Do Is Rap"	2016	Non-album singles
"Wave"	2017	Songs About Girls
"Epiphany" (featuring NF)	2017	Blessings
"Happy Dance"	2017	Non-album singles
"Everyday Is My Birthday"	2017	Non-album singles
"Real You"	2017	Non-album singles
"Somewhere in the Middle"	2017	Non-album singles
"Get It Together"	2017	Blessings
"Forget That's It Over"	2017	Songs About Girls
"What More Could You Ask for?"	2017	What More Could You Ask for?
"Talk" (featuring Tech N9ne and Devvon Terrell)	2017	Blessings
"Nobody Else"	2018	Non-album singles
"Goals"	2018	Non-album singles
"Take a Ride"	2018	Non-album singles
"Lil Bit"	2018	Non-album singles
"All Barz"	2018	Non-album singles
"Easy Peasy" (with Akt Aktion and Nubs)	2018	Non-album singles
"That's That"	2019	I Am...
"Main Homie"	2019	Zachary Lewis
"Feel Me"	2019	Non-album singles
"Hibachi"	2019	Non-album singles
"Fire"	2019	Non-album singles
"Somethin Real" (featuring Kira Kosarin and Sik World)	2019	Non-album singles
"Don’t Nobody Have to Know"	2019	Non-album singles
"Nu Nu"	2019	Non-album singles
"Top 10" (with gianni & kyle)	2019	I Am...
"48 Hours"	2019	I Am...
"Up"	2019	I Am...
"Boomin" (with Moosh & Twist)	2019	Non-album single
"Let Down" (with Ekoh)	2019	The De2our
"Poison" (with Matthew Tuck)	2019	Non-album singles
"Dreaming2" (with Mark Battles and Chuuwee featuring Tory Lanez)	2019	Non-album singles
"Star Gazing" (with Bingx)	2019	Non-album singles
"Sorry for Y'all"	2020	Still on the Rise
"Mira" (with Emilio Rojas and Nate Brush)	2020	Non-album singles
"Finally Met You"	2020	Non-album singles
"Wishawoods"	2020	Still on the Rise
"Motion"	2020	Still on the Rise
"Champion"	2020	Still on the Rise
"Take My Love Away" (with Michael Minelli)	2020	Pass the Wine
"The Sweet Life" (with Kode Break)	2020	Non-album singles
"Die Proud" (with Lucid)	2020	Non-album singles
"Nervous" (with CHVSE)	2020	Non-album singles
"Pull Up" (featuring Kap G)	2020	Still on the Rise
"Like This" (with Rittz)	2020	Still on the Rise
"OG Now" (with Chris Webby)	2020	Still on the Rise
"Hopeless" (with CJ Johnson and Seth Bishop)	2020	Non-album singles
"Pages Turning" (with AKT Aktion and SwizZz featuring The Kaleidoscope Kid)	2020	Non-album singles
"Acting Up" (with Kris King)	2020	All Authentic
"Cool AF" (with Jzac)	2020	Featuristic
"I.O.F.W.R." (with Justina Valentine and Mark Battles)	2020	Featuristic
"Put the Breaks on Me" (with Michael Minelli)	2020	Pass the Wine
"Skid Row" (with Ekoh and Jarren Benton)	2020	Featuristic
"Now or Never" (Note: Only the remix version appears on the album.) (with Crypt)	2020	Featuristic
"Michael Jordan" (with Gawne)	2020	Featuristic
"Come Home" (with 24hrs and YBN Almighty Jay)	2020	Featuristic
"Zenith" (with Anickan featuring Chris Rivers)	2020	Sprpwr: Dark
"Options" (with Locksmith and Ekoh)	2020	Non-album single
"2K" (with Michael Minelli)	2020	I Know What You're Thinking
"Ghost" (with Michael Minelli)	2021	I Know What You're Thinking
"Gone" (with Michael Minelli)	2021	I Know What You're Thinking
"Waste Your Time" (with Michael Minelli)	2021	I Know What You're Thinking
"Know Me" (with Michael Minelli)	2021	I Know What You're Thinking
"Built Different" (with Michael Minelli)	2021	I Know What You're Thinking
"Ain't Sayin'" (with Michael Minelli)	2021	I Know What You're Thinking
"Oh Yea" (with Michael Minelli featuring Charles Infamous)	2021	I Know What You're Thinking
"Bad Decisions" (with Michael Minelli)	2021	I Know What You're Thinking
"Pogo" (featuring GROUPCHAT, Formulah and Mario Sterling)	2021	Non-album single
"Don't Wanna Be Famous" (with Poetics)	2021	Don't Wanna Be Famous
"Hol Up" (with Chris Rivers)	2021	Don't Wanna Be Famous
"Anxious"	2021	Don't Wanna Be Famous
"Make Me Wanna"	2021	Don't Wanna Be Famous
"Who's That" (with Abhi the Nomad)	2021	Don't Wanna Be Famous
"Sedona" (with Alyssa Gutirrez)	2021	Don't Wanna Be Famous
"Sedona" (with Alyssa Gutirrez)	2021	Don't Wanna Be Famous
"I Guess I'll Smoke Again" (with Dizzy Wright and Berner featuring Durand the Rapper and Boboy Watson)	2022	Non-album singles
"I Don't Really Care"	2022	Non-album singles
"Gucci"	2022	Never 2 Late
"Highs & Lows"	2022	Never 2 Late
"Dead To Me" (with Loveless)	2022	Never 2 Late
"Hate Me Now" (with Ryan Oakes)	2022	Never 2 Late
"How Could You" (with Magnolia Park)	2022	Never 2 Late
"Drinkin & Drivin"	2022	Never 2 Late
"True Colors" (with Tech N9ne)	2022	Never 2 Late
"Billie Eilish" (with The Color 8 and This Modern)	2022	Non-album singles
"Unholy" (featuring The Color 8)	2022	Non-album singles
"Poland" (with The Color 8 and This Modern)	2022	Non-album singles
"Tell Me Anything"	2022	Never 2 Late
"Ashley's Song"	2022	Never 2 Late
"Aint Taking Me Back"	2022	Never 2 Late
"Hey"	2022	Never 2 Late
"Hell Ya"	2022	Never 2 Late

=== As featured artist ===
List of singles as a featured artist, with selected chart positions, showing year released and album name
Title	Year	Peak chart positions			Album
Title	Year	US	US Adult	CAN	Album
"No Touching" (Oobergeek featuring Futuristic and Krizz Kaliko)	2013	—	—	—	non-album singles
"Goin Thru It" (Sean Brown featuring Futuristic)	2014	—	—	—	non-album singles
"Get It" (Akt Aktion featuring Futuristic, Chamillionaire and Kutt Calhoun)	2014	—	—	—	non-album singles
"Hollywood" (TJ Hickey featuring Futuristic)	2014	—	—	—	non-album singles
"What I'm Talkin' Bout" (Sam King featuring Futuristic)	2014	—	—	—	non-album singles
"I'm the Realest" (Mill Bill featuring Futuristic)	2015	—	—	—	non-album singles
"Hold Each Other" (A Great Big World featuring Futuristic)	2015	99	12	69	When the Morning Comes
"Flex On U" (Dylan Reese featuring Futuristic)	2015	—	—	—	non-album single
"All the Way" (Justina Valentine featuring Futuristic)	2015	—	—	—	Scarlet Letter
"Bubble" (Wordplay T. Jay featuring Futuristic)	2016	—	—	—	Job Application
"IDGAF" (Andrew Balogh featuring Lexy Panterra, Futuristic and Beez)	2016	—	—	—	non-album singles
"Stone Heart" (Tyrik Ballard featuring Futuristic)	2016	—	—	—	non-album singles
"Last of the Real" (Hi-Rez featuring Chris Webby and Futuristic)	2017	—	—	—	Never Say Die
"How Are You?" (Marquel Deljuan featuring Futuristic)	2018	—	—	—	non-album singles
"Make a Wish" (Kevmo featuring Futuristic)	2018	—	—	—	non-album singles
"Lil Goddess" (BrownBoi Maj featuring Futuristic)	2018	—	—	—	non-album singles
"No Respect" (Dax featuring Futuristic)	2018	—	—	—	It's Different Now
"My Own Zone" (Tech N9ne featuring Futuristic and Dizzy Wright)	2018	—	—	—	non-album singles
"Out Here Poppin'" (Kato on the Track featuring Futuristic)	2018	—	—	—	non-album singles
"Time for That" (Just Juice featuring Futuristic)	2018	—	—	—	non-album singles
"Trapped in Hell" (Kung Fu Vampire featuring Futuristic)	2018	—	—	—	Come Dawn
"Show Love" (Demrick and DJ Hoppa featuring Futuristic)	2019	—	—	—	non-album single
"Thousand" (Vic Sage featuring Futuristic)	2019	—	—	—	Broke & Happy
"Death to Mumble Rap" (Gawne featuring Mac Lethal, Futuristic and Crypt)	2019	—	—	—	Terminal
"Hate" (Versvs featuring Futuristic)	2019	—	—	—	non-album singles
"Life We Chose" (Vin Jay featuring Futuristic)	2020	—	—	—	non-album singles
"Ballin" (T.Eazy featuring Futuristic)	2020	—	—	—	non-album singles
"Broken Promises" (ThinkBenjamin and Brayke featuring Futuristic)	2020	—	—	—	non-album singles
"YouTube Cypher, Vol. 3" (Crypt featuring Dax, Merkules, Futuristic, Ekoh, NoLifeShaq, 100Kufis, Samad Savage, Carly X, Ashtin Larold, Crank Lucas, D.I.L.E.M.A, Feral the Earthworm and King Blitz)	2020	—	—	—	non-album singles

== Guest appearances ==
List of non-single guest appearances, with other performing artists, showing year released and album name
Title	Year	Other artist(s)	Album
"Hunger"	2013	Marc Goone	I Am Not a Lobster Ok
"Make of It"	2013	Heaven Sent	Life and Rhymes of Heaven Sent Episode 1
"Inside My Head"	2014	Sincerely Collins	Sincerely the Mixtape, Vol. 1
"Day 1 Homies"	2014	Kato, Irv da Phenom, Chris Webby	Kato's Revenge
"Who They"	2014	Devvon Terrell	The Living Weirdo_o
"Let Me See It"	2014	Mike Styles	Lost Dreams
"Just Enjoying Life"	2014	Demrick, Cali Cleve	Going Up Gang
"Who Am I"	2015	Sincerely Collins, SVNAH	Destroyer
"Grown"	2015	DJ Hoppa, Devon Lee, Wax, Dizzy Wright	Hoppa and Friends
"Blinded"	2015	Locksmith, Jarren Benton	Lofty Goals
"Run This Shit"	2015	The Raskal, Sincerely Collins	Trust No One
"Coolin' on 'Em"	2015	Keize Montoya, Doza	Nomad
"Hotel (Remix)"	2015	Sweens, Jarren Benton	Light Up II
"Drop It Low"	2016	Ernie	Ernie's Journey
"Bruh (Remix)"	2016	Lil Twon, Wes Walker	non-album single
"Loop & Joop"	2016	Top Flite Empire	Bad Decisions
"No Love"	2016	Mark Battles, King Los	Before the Deal
"Michael Phelps"	2016	Brandon DaZ	#Blackunicorn
"No Fucks to Give"	2016	Jarren Benton, Chris Webby	Slow Motion, Vol. 2
"Maybe I Do"	2016	Huey Mack, James Davidson	The Longest Year of My Life
"How It Go"	2016	Trizz	LeatherFace 2
"Fake Love"	2016	Seven Trill	Christopher
"Full Steam Ahead"	2017	Chris Webby	Webster's Laboratory II
"Why You Worried"	2017	Odd Squad Family	Welcome to the Family
"Good God"	2017	Mogul	With My Friends
"Here We Go Again"	2018	Mark Battles, Jarren Benton	Vasi World
"Call Me Up"	2018	Ali Tomineek	#FridayFlow
"Hold Me Down"	2018	TJ, Torrian Ball	Love Yourself
"No Time"	2018	Feeki	Born-n-Bread
"Only One"	2019	Justin Stone	Homecoming
"89 Chevy"	2019	James Wade	And the Wisdom to Know the Difference
"Never Slipped My Mind"	2019	Dizzy Wright	Nobody Cares, Work Harder
"F'n Do It"	2019	Tech N9ne, JL	N9na
"Rising"	2019	Brielle Marie, Lve Sick	Tranquility
"Hush (Remix)"	2019	Corey Ellis, Dizzy Wright, Ian Matthew	non-album single
"Unlimited"	2019	Doc	Unlimited
"Sheesh"	2019	Crypt	Tales from the Crypt
"Live It Up"	2019	Rittz	Put a Crown on It
"Way Back"	2020	Randolph	Going Clear
"Going Off"	2020	Vin Jay, Cryptic Wisdom	Prophecy
"GOOD TIME"	2020	Corey Ellis	GOOD TIME
"Acting Up"	2020	Kris King	non-album single
"Arrived"	2020	Abstract	Kintsugi
