= Devvon Terrell discography =

- Studio albums: 4
- EPs: 6
- Singles: 85
- Collaborative albums: 1
- Mixtapes: 2

The discography of American singer, rapper and songwriter Devvon Terrell consists of four studio albums, one collaboration album, two mixtapes, six extended plays and 85 singles (including 30 singles as a featured artist).

== Albums ==
=== Studio albums ===
List of studio albums, with selected details
Title	Album details
Weird Sexy Cool	Released: August 18, 2015; Label: The R Music Group; Format: CD, digital download, streaming
Weird Nights	Released: October 6, 2017; Label: Self-released; Formats: CD, digital download, streaming
The Rawe Sound, Vol 1	Released: July 26, 2019; Label: Self-released; Formats: CD, digital download, streaming
Vol. 2: Deja Vu	Released: October 2, 2020; Label: Self-released; Formats: CD, digital download, streaming
Boys Don't Cry	Released: March 18, 2022; Label: Self-released; Formats: CD, digital download, streaming

=== Collaborative albums ===
List of collaborative studio albums, with selected chart positions and details
Title	Album details	Peaks		
Title	Album details	US	US R&B/HH	US Rap
Coast 2 Coast (with Futuristic)	Released: December 25, 2015; Label: Self-released; Formats: CD, digital download, streaming	82	12	10

=== Mixtapes ===
List of mixtapes, with selected details
Title	Mixtape details
April Fools (with Young X)	Released: March 27, 2010; Label: The R Music Group; Formats: Digital download
Download or Die (with Young X)	Released: August 8, 2010; Label: The R Music Group; Formats: Digital download

== Extended plays ==
List of extended plays, with selected chart positions and details
Title	EP details	Peak chart positions	
Title	EP details	US R&B/HH	US R&B
The Living Weirdo_o	Released: September 2, 2014; Label: The R Music Group; Formats: Digital download, streaming	—	—
The Renaissance	Released: September 2, 2016; Label: Self-released; Formats: CD, digital download, streaming	27	11
The Mixes	Released: April 26, 2017; Label: Self-released; Formats: Digital download, streaming	—	—
Weird Nights - The Intermission	Released: November 16, 2018; Label: Self-released; Formats: CD, digital download, streaming	—	—
The Rawe Sound, Vol. 1: Side B	Released: September 13, 2019; Label: Self-released; Formats: Digital download, streaming	—	—
Social Distancing Together	Released: May 8, 2020; Label: Self-released; Formats: Digital download, streaming	—	—
"—" denotes a recording that did not chart or was not released in that territory.

== Singles ==
=== As lead artist ===
List of singles as lead artist, showing year released and album name
Title	Year	Album
"And1" (featuring Kash)	2011	Non-album single
"I Like It"	2014	The Living Weirdo_o (Note: Only the remix version appears on the album.)
"The One"	2015	Non-album single
"Tell You Off" (featuring Witt Lowry)	2015	Weird Sexy Cool
"Feelings and Liquor" (with Futuristic, Huey Mack and Cam Meekins)	2015	Non-album single
"#WCW" (Remix)	2015	The Living Weirdo_o (Note: Only the original version appears on the album.)
"Billion Dollars" (with Futuristic featuring OCD: Moosh & Twist)	2015	Non-album single
"I Want It All" (with Futuristic)	2015	Coast 2 Coast
"Keep It Pushin'"	2016	Non-album singles
"Live and Learn"	2016	Non-album singles
"Why So Serious"	2016	The Renaissance
"Da da Dee"	2016	Non-album singles
"Man Down"	2016	Non-album singles
"One Thing at a Time"	2016	Non-album singles
"I Can't Wait"	2016	Non-album singles
"Trust Me"	2017	Non-album singles
"Call Me"	2017	Non-album singles
"No Love in the City"	2017	Non-album singles
"I'm Sorry Dad"	2017	Non-album singles
"Hello World"	2017	Non-album singles
"Dear Mama"	2017	Non-album singles
"Temperature"	2017	Weird Nights
"You Different"	2018	Non-album singles
"Business and Pleasure"	2018	Non-album singles
"Switching Sides"	2018	Non-album singles
"N.F.L"	2018	Non-album singles
"She a Dub"	2019	Non-album singles
"Take Me Serious"	2019	The Rawe Sound, Vol 1
"Die on This Hill"	2019	The Rawe Sound, Vol 1
"Who Made You"	2019	The Rawe Sound, Vol 1
"Power Of 10"	2019	The Rawe Sound, Vol 1
"Number 1"	2019	The Rawe Sound, Vol 1
"Too Expensive"	2019	The Rawe Sound, Vol 1
"I Want You"	2019	The Rawe Sound, Vol 1
"Chasing Ceilings"	2019	The Rawe Sound, Vol 1
"What Is This"	2019	The Rawe Sound, Vol 1
"Replay"	2019	The Rawe Sound, Vol 1
"The Signs"	2019	The Rawe Sound, Vol 1
"No I in Team"	2019	The Rawe Sound, Vol 1
"Locked in the Bathroom"	2019	The Rawe Sound, Vol 1
"Space and Opportunity"	2019	The Rawe Sound, Vol 1
"Cease and Desist"	2019	The Rawe Sound, Vol 1
"Rumors"	2019	The Rawe Sound, Vol 1
"Sade"	2019	The Rawe Sound, Vol 1
"Not Happy for You"	2019	The Rawe Sound, Vol. 1: Side B
"Back to You"	2019	The Rawe Sound, Vol. 1: Side B
"Love Crimes"	2019	The Rawe Sound, Vol. 1: Side B
"Brand New Drug"	2019	The Rawe Sound, Vol. 1: Side B
"Locked in the Bathroom, Pt. 2"	2019	The Rawe Sound, Vol. 1: Side B
"Week 1"	2020	Social Distancing Together
"Week 2"	2020	Social Distancing Together
"Week 3"	2020	Social Distancing Together
"Say Their Names" (featuring Trey Budden, Coco Jones, Kai Cash, Sydney Renae, Futuristic, Cashflow Harlem and Kiyanne)	2020	Non-album single
"Homewrecker"	2020	Vol. 2: Deja Vu
"You Trippin"	2020	Vol. 2: Deja Vu

=== As featured artist ===
List of singles as a featured artist, with selected chart positions, showing year released and album name
Title	Year	Peak chart positions	Album
Title	Year	POL	Album
"Purchase This" (Young X featuring Devvon Terrell)	2010	—	Download or Die
"In the Zone" (Futuristic featuring Collins, J Rob the Chief and Devvon Terrell)	2014	—	Traveling Local
"Run Away" (Joe Ness featuring Devvon Terrell)	2014	—	Ellipsis
"Hate in Disguise" (Gdott featuring Devvon Terrell)	2014	—	Non-album single
"Sky Dive" (Remix) (Dray Solis featuring Devvon Terrell)	2015	—	HillSide
"Believe Dat" (Raj featuring Devvon Terrell and Ab)	2015	—	Non-album singles
"Undeniable" (TJ Hickey featuring Devvon Terrell)	2015	—	Non-album singles
"Alright" (Young X featuring Devvon Terrell)	2015	—	For a Few Dollas More
"Beat It Up (Like a Drum)" (Tiger Bey and Da Beast featuring Devvon Terrell)	2015	—	Non-album singles
"Ring My Line" (Juston Kace featuring Devvon Terrell)	2016	—	Non-album singles
"Controlla" (William Singe featuring Devvon Terrell)	2016	—	Non-album singles
"I Have to Go" (Moefya featuring Devvon Terrell)	2016	—	Non-album singles
"Never Fall" (Mogul featuring Devvon Terrell)	2017	—	With My Friends
"Finally Change" (Huey Mack featuring Devvon Terrell)	2017	—	Non-album singles
"On and Off" (Kayla Brianna featuring Devvon Terrell)	2017	—	Non-album singles
"Talk" (Futuristic featuring Tech N9ne and Devvon Terrell)	2017	—	Blessings
"Make Sense" (Bronxlyn featuring Devvon Terrell)	2018	—	Non-album singles
"(I Can't Get No) Satisfaction" (AG featuring Devvon Terrell)	2018	—	Non-album singles
"Love Me Now" (Gromee featuring Devvon Terrell and Wurld)	2019	62	Non-album singles
"Not Nice" (Remix) (Xuitcasecity featuring Devvon Terrell and Pink Sweats)	2019	—	Non-album singles
"Legendz" (AG featuring Devvon Terrell)	2019	—	Non-album singles
"C4" (The Colleagues featuring Devvon Terrell)	2019	—	Another Love Story
"Run For Da Money" (AG featuring Devvon Terrell)	2019	—	Non-album singles
"YouTube Cypher, Vol. 2" (Crypt featuring Quadeca, Mac Lethal, ImDontai, Devvon Terrell, Ryan Oakes, Moxas, Scru Face Jean, VI Seconds, Gawne, NemRaps, Lex Bratcher and DkRapArtist)	2019	—	Non-album singles
"Bummxr" (Xuitcasecity featuring Devvon Terrell)	2019	—	Non-album singles
"You Tight" (Tyler Rohn featuring Devvon Terrell)	2019	—	Non-album singles
"E-Girls" (Hi-Rez featuring Devvon Terrell)	2020	—	Non-album singles
"No Rest For the Wicked" (GoldFord and AG featuring Devvon Terrell)	2020	—	Non-album singles
"Siri Say" (Gassedup featuring Devvon Terrell)	2020	—	Non-album singles
"Fine" (Gabby B featuring Devvon Terrell)	2020	—	Non-album singles

== Guest appearances ==
List of non-single guest appearances, with other performing artists, showing year released and album name
Title	Year	Other artist(s)	Album
"Stadium Status"	2012	Young X	Fistful of Dollas
"Hurt They Feelings"	2012	Young X, J.A.Y.	Fistful of Dollas
"We Bout That"	2012	Young X	Fistful of Dollas
"Chasing Down a Dream"	2013	Futuristic	Chasing Down a Dream
"Bout to Blow"	2013	Futuristic, Willy Northpole, E Batt	Chasing Down a Dream
"Price to Life"	2013	Futuristic	Chasing Down a Dream
"Red Light Texting"	2013	Futuristic	Chasing Down a Dream
"Got No Reason"	2013	Young X	Man With No Name 2
"Freckles"	2013	Futuristic	T.G.I.F.
"On Point"	2015	Swave HMG	Legendary
"The Rise"	2015	Futuristic	The Rise
"So Many Nights"	2015	Witt Lowry	Dreaming With Our Eyes Open
"Let Go"	2015	Tray Pizzy	50 First Dates
"A Real One"	2015	Tray Pizzy	50 First Dates
"Tip Her"	2016	The Raj Gxd	Diary of a Side
"On Me"	2016	The Raj Gxd	Diary of a Side
"Nudes"	2016	Futuristic	As Seen on the Internet
"A Song to Sing"	2016	Kid Quill, Mark Battles	The Name Above the Title
"My Life"	2016	Authentik	Still Me
"Mr Right Now"	2017	TJ Hickey	So You're a Rapper, Right?
"I'm Up"	2017	Hi-Rez	Missing Pieces
"Thing for You"	2017	Daivon	Made to Remember
"Remind Me"	2018	Kevin AntoniYo	The Motions
"Foldgers"	2019	Demrick	No Wasting Time
"I Got You"	2019	Vedo	Vedo
"What's Next"	2020	Da YoungFellaz	Even Exchange
"Villain"	2020	L. Jean, Dellz	Limbo
"Letter 2 My Idol"	2020	Japan	Sideways
"Know My Name"	2020	CHVSE	Psycho Therapy
"ATL"	2020	Samson	Love Hz
"I Don't Like You"	2020	Futuristic	Still on the Rise
