= Ian Axel =

American musician (born 1985)

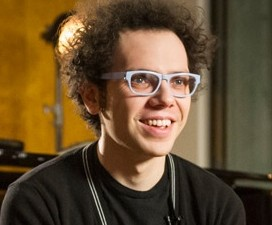
- Ian Axel in 2014

Background information
- Born: March 28, 1985 (age 41); Fair Lawn, New Jersey, U.S.
- Genre: Pop
- Occupations: Singer; songwriter
- Instruments: Vocals; piano; ukulele
- Years active: 2006–present
- Member of: A Great Big World
- Website: ianaxel.com

Ian Axel (born March 28, 1985) is an American singer and songwriter. After becoming well known with his song "This Is the New Year", he developed a solo career, eventually joining forces with long-time writing partner, Chad King, to form the duo band A Great Big World in 2012.

== Career ==
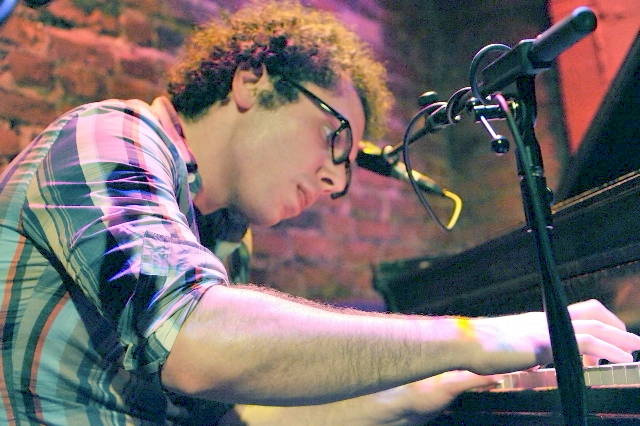
Axel performing at Rockwood Music Hall in NYC

Axel grew up in Fair Lawn, New Jersey. He graduated from Fair Lawn High School (Class of 2003). He then moved to Manhattan, attending NYU. In 2006, Axel began performing publicly as a solo act. His song "This Is The New Year" became well-known originally when iTunes selected it as a Discovery Download and for its video on YouTube. Later it was featured as the theme song for the MTV documentary series I Used to Be Fat, which premiered December 29, 2010.

Axel's album, named after the title single, was initially released in 2010 as a self-release, then released a second time in partnership with tinyOGRE Entertainment. The tinyOGRE version was released digitally on February 15, 2011 and on CD on April 12, 2011. Later "This Is The New Year" was used in the opening sequence of Garry Marshall's film New Year's Eve. The partnership with tinyOGRE ended when the company dissolved in December 2011.

In 2010, Axel's long-time writing partner, Chad King, began joining him on stage more frequently and in 2012 they formed the band A Great Big World. They rose to further prominence with worldwide hit "Say Something", particularly after recording it as a duet collaboration with Christina Aguilera. The duet peaked at number four on the Billboard Hot 100.

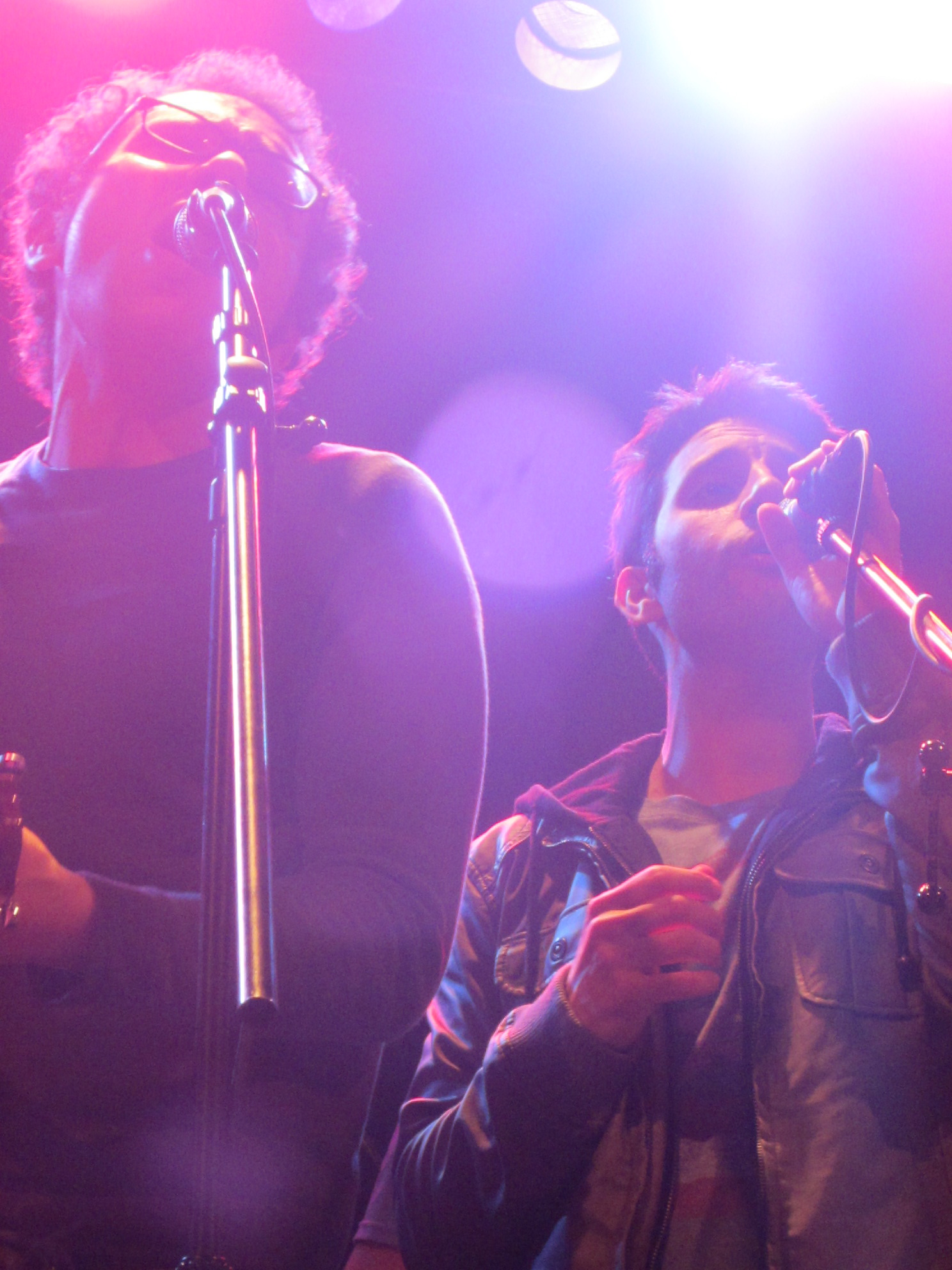
Ian Axel and Chad King at Bowery Ballroom May 2011

Axel's primary instrument is the piano. He is also known for playing a number of songs on the ukulele.

== Notable appearances ==
He made his national television debut on the Rachael Ray show and NPR said in their Song of the Day feature that he had “a voice that possesses the sweetness of youth, the stubbornness of a teenager and the swagger of a rock star.”

In April 2011, the song "Gone" was featured prominently in Episode 19 of Season 8 of One Tree Hill, titled "Where Not to Look for Freedom.". As part of Tom's Shoes "One Day Without Shoes" campaign to raise awareness for children's poverty, Ian Axel performed two songs live on an advertorial website created in cooperation with La Blogotheque.

In July 2011 Axel opened for Five for Fighting at the Alive at Five Concert Series in Stamford, Connecticut.

In August 2011 Axel and King opened for Matthew Morrison at the Beacon Theatre.

In January 2012 Axel and King were the musical guests at Amanda Stern's Happy Endings Music and Reading Series at Joe's Pub On November 24, 2013, Axel performed at the American Music Awards with Christina Aguilera.

On January 31, 2013, "This Is The New Year" was the closing song on Glee's Season 4, Episode 12 titled "Naked".

Ian Axel also performed during the 2013 Victoria's Secret Fashion show.

== Personal life ==
Axel was born to a Jewish family and had a bar mitzvah but is a secular Jew.

== Discography ==
Solo releases

- 2007: I'm On to You EP
- 2011: This Is the New Year LP

in band A Great Big World

- 2012: A Great Big World EP
- 2014: Is There Anybody Out There? LP
- 2015: When the Morning Comes LP
