= The Early October =

Studio album by Air Dubai
- Released: October 29, 2008
- Recorded: Denver, CO
- Genre: Hip Hop
- Length: 45.8
- Producer: Air Dubai

Air Dubai chronology
The Early October (2008)	Wonder Age (2010)

The Early October is the first mixtape released by Air Dubai on October 29, 2008.

== Background ==
In the summer of 2008 rapper Julian Thomas approached rapper/singer Jon Shockness about creating a group under the name Air Dubai. By September 2008 they were in the studio recording the 12 song album that would stand as the base for their eventual progression into a full 7 piece full instrumental band.

On March 13, 2010, Air Dubai announced that The Early October had officially gone out of print.

== Track listing ==
No.	Title	Writer(s)	Length
1.	"Take Me Away"	Air Dubai	3:10
2.	"Suicide Bomber"	Air Dubai	3:54
3.	"Nevermind The Bollocks..."	Air Dubai	3:34
4.	"Warm Days In LA"	Air Dubai, Skhyzo	3:49
5.	"Maternal Dedication"	Air Dubai	2:23
6.	"Now"	Air Dubai, J-Smizz	3:57
7.	"Bringing Back Hip Hop"	Air Dubai	4:23
8.	"She Got Me All Tied Up"	Air Dubai	4:01
9.	"You"	Air Dubai	4:06
10.	"Northern Lights"	Air Dubai	4:13
11.	"Ancient Phonebooth"	Air Dubai	4:03
12.	"Baby I'm A Mess..."	Air Dubai	4:23
