= Age of Wonder =

Age of Wonder may refer to:

- The Age of Wonder: How the Romantic Generation Discovered the Beauty and Terror of Science, 2008 biography book by Richard Holmes
- Age of Wonders, 1999 turn-based strategy video game and its sequels
- JLA: Age of Wonder, 2003 comic book mini-series
- Wonder Age, 2010 album by Air Dubai
