= Air Dubai =

American hip hop group

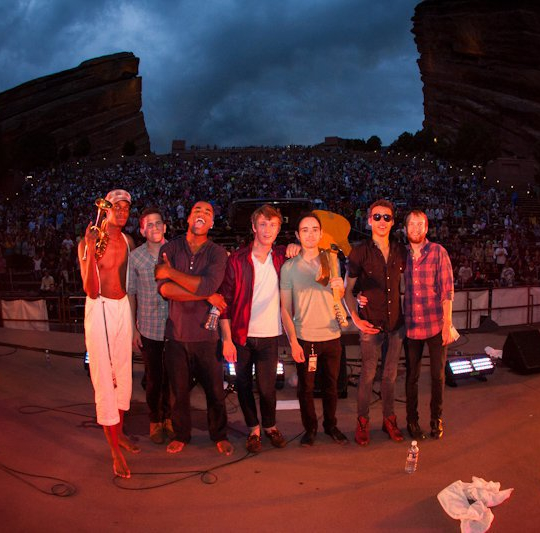
- Air Dubai performing at Red Rocks Amphitheatre in 2011.

Background information
- Origin: Denver, Colorado, U.S.
- Genres: Hip hop, alternative rock
- Years active: 2008–2015
- Label: Hopeless Records
- Members: Julian Church; Jon Shockness; Lawrence Grivich; Michael Ray; Taylor Tait; Nick Spreigl
- Past members: Wesley Watkins
- Website: http://www.airdubaimusic.com

Air Dubai is an American six-piece hip hop band from Denver, Colorado, United States. The band is composed of vocalists Julian Church and Jon Shockness, with Lawrence Grivich (guitar), Michael Ray (keyboards/synth), Taylor Tait (bass), and Nick Spreigl (drums). The band is known for their highly energetic live performances and their sound has been characterized as a mixture of R&B, jazz, and alternative rock. The band was voted Westword Magazine's best Hip Hop band in their 2010, 2011 and 2012 award showcases. In December 2012 the band announced via their social media pages they had been signed to Hopeless Records and released their major label debut album Be Calm in 2014. In August 2015, the band announced that they would be going on an "indefinite hiatus".

== History ==
=== Beginnings (2009) ===
Air Dubai began as a collaboration between Julian Church and Jon Shockness while the two were still in high school in Denver, Colorado. Starting initially as a side project, the pair focused more seriously when local blogs and publications began to take notice.

In June 2009, the duo decided to forego electronic beats and began performing with all live instrumentation. Adding new members, also Denver-based musicians; Lawrence Grivich, Michael Ray, Nicholas Spreigl and Taylor Tait.

=== Wonder Age (2010) ===
On April 19, 2010, Air Dubai announced on their official website that a new EP was in the works, with an expected release date of June 15, 2010. On June 1, Air Dubai announced they would be extending the EP into a full album and pushing the release date back. The album was their first release as a full band and titled Wonder Age. Andy Guerrero, member of Colorado Hip Hop band Flobots acted as producer for the album. On August 7, 2010, Air Dubai announced via their official YouTube channel that Wonder Age would be released worldwide on October 5, 2010.

On March 28, 2011, Air Dubai released a remix album featuring remixed songs from Wonder Age for free on their official website.

=== Day Escape (2011) ===
In summer of 2011, Air Dubai visited northern California to work on their next musical venture. Legendary producer Sylvia Massy, who has done albums for such bands as Tool, Red Hot Chili Peppers and Prince was the lead producer for the album. On October 14, 2011, they announced via their facebook page that they would be releasing their newest album on October 25 titled Day Escape. The release of Day Escape saw further success for the band, with multiple songs being featured on MTV's Jersey Shore and I Used To Be Fat. With the release of Day Escape, Air Dubai also began touring extensively as well as making several festival appearances.

=== Be Calm and hiatus (2012 – 2015) ===
Shortly after the release of "Day Escape", Air Dubai began writing for what was to be a follow-up EP. When they compiled their scrapped demos with the new songs they were writing, they decided they had enough material to produce a full-length. The album, which finished production on June 20, 2012, was recorded in Austin, Texas and was produced by Grammy Award winning producer Dwight Baker.

On August 17, 2012, they announced via a video trailer on their YouTube channel and website that their new album, which was planned to be released in Fall of 2012, would be titled Be Calm. On September 12, 2012, they released the first single from Be Calm titled "All Day" and shortly after the second single titled "'Warning". On November 11, a few days before the planned release date for the album, Air Dubai announced they would have to postpone the release of Be Calm. In December 2012 it was revealed that this was due to the band being signed to indie music label Hopeless Records.

On December 4, 2013, Air Dubai was announced as one of the bands taking a part in Vans Warped Tour 2014.

Be Calm was released on July 1, 2014, through Hopeless Records, their label debut.

In August 2015, the band announced that they would be going on an "indefinite hiatus", citing burnout and work on solo projects as the reasons.

== Discography ==
=== Studio albums ===
- Wonder Age (2010)
- Be Calm (2014)

=== EPs ===
- Day Escape (2011)
- Warning EP (2013)
- Pastels (2020)

== Singles ==
Title	Year	Album
Restless Youth	2010	Wonder Age
Soul & Body	2014	Be Calm
Warning (feat. Patricia Lynn)	2014	Be Calm
