= Hold Each Other =

Single by A Great Big World featuring Futuristic

from the album When the Morning Comes
- Released: July 22, 2015
- Recorded: 2015
- Genre: Indie pop
- Length: 3:37
- Label: Epic
- Songwriters: Ian Axel; Chad King; Zachary Beck
- Producer: Dan Romer

A Great Big World singles chronology
"Already Home" (2014)	"Hold Each Other" (2015)	"Oasis" (2015)

Futuristic singles chronology
"Feelings and Liquor" (2015)	"Hold Each Other" (2015)	"Flex On U" (2015)

Music video
- "Hold Each Other" on YouTube

"Hold Each Other" is a song by American pop duo A Great Big World, released as the lead single from their second studio album, When the Morning Comes. The song was released on July 22, 2015, through Epic Records and features vocals from American rapper Futuristic.

== Music video ==
The song's accompanying music video premiered on September 16, 2015, through their Vevo channel.

== Commercial performance ==
"Hold Each Other" debuted on the US Billboard Hot 100 chart at number 99 during the week of October 10, 2015, becoming A Great Big World's second Hot 100 entry and Futuristic's first. The song also debuted on the Canadian Hot 100 chart at number 69.

== Charts ==
=== Weekly charts ===
Chart (2015)	Peak position
Canada Hot 100 (Billboard)	69
US Billboard Hot 100	99
US Adult Contemporary (Billboard)	23
US Adult Pop Airplay (Billboard)	12
US Pop Airplay (Billboard)	25

=== Year-end charts ===
Chart (2015)	Position
US Adult Top 40 (Billboard)	45
