= Is There Anybody Out There? (album) =

Studio album by A Great Big World
- Released: January 21, 2014
- Recorded: 2011–13
- Genres: Pop; pop rock
- Length: 44:30
- Labels: Black Magnetic; Epic
- Producers: Dan Romer; Chris Kuffner; John Alagía

A Great Big World chronology
| Is There Anybody Out There? (2014) | When the Morning Comes (2015) |

Singles from Is There Anybody Out There?
- 1. "This Is the New Year" Released: May 21, 2013; 2. "Say Something" Released: September 3, 2013; 3. "Already Home" Released: April 21, 2014

Is There Anybody Out There? is the debut album from American pop duo A Great Big World. Its single "Say Something" achieved considerable success after Christina Aguilera heard the song, decided to collaborate and a re-recorded version was released.

== Critical reception ==
Professional ratings
Review scores
| Source | Rating |
|---|---|
| AllMusic | 3.5/5 stars |
| New York Daily News | 2/5 stars |
| Newsday | (B+) |
| USA Today | 3/4 stars |

The reception to the album has been mixed. Timothy Monger of AllMusic thought that the duo Ian Axel and Chad King tackled "some classic pop territory with a wide-eyed sincerity that is ultimately appealing if occasionally trite," that the production is "concise and full of punch," but there are moments that could "benefit from some subtlety." Jason Lipschutz of Billboard said that the album is "as uniformly earnest as the sombre lead" single "Say Something," but also has songs that offered "quirky optimism and snappy tempo." Glenn Gamboa of Newsday found the album filled with surprises and thought it musically and lyrically "eclectic." He judged the duo to have approached the album "with such passion and joyfulness on "Is There Anyone Out There?" (sic) that you end up going along for the wild ride and enjoying it." Elysa Gardner of USA Today was equally positive and thought the tunes in the album "smartly crafted," the singing of the duo blended "seamlessly," and that their more driving tracks "establish this pair as pop contenders."

Among the more negative reviews, Jim Farber of New York Daily News castigated the album, calling it the "latest, and clumsiest, example" of "the geekiest elements of modern show tunes into the musical mainstream," one that "pivots on the kind of reedy, sexually unsure, and over-articulated vocals that scream 'bad Broadway.'" Jon Caramanica of the New York Times considered the album to be "gentle and plain-spoken and free of any artifice," but also "dull" and "painfully executed." He also found Axel's voice to be "grating," have "no color" and to be "almost digital in its simplicity."

== Commercial performance ==
The album debuted on the Billboard 200 at No. 3 with sales of 48,000. It dropped to No. 33 the following week with sale of 11,000. The album has sold 165,000 copies as of October 2015.

== Singles ==
- "This Is the New Year" (released May 21, 2013)
- "Say Something" (September 3, 2013)
- "I Really Want It" (promotional single; December 10, 2013) and (May 2, 2014 released as a single)
- "Rockstar" (promotional single; March 3, 2014)
- "Already Home" (radio single; April 21, 2014)

== Track listing ==
All tracks are written by Ian Axel and Chad King, except "Already Home" written by Axel, King and Honey LaRochelle; "Say Something" written by Axel, King and Mike Campbell; "I Don't Wanna Love Somebody Else" written by Axel, King and Allie Moss.

| No. | Title | Producer(s) | Length |
|---|---|---|---|
| 1. | "Rockstar" | Dan Romer | 3:56 |
| 2. | "Land of Opportunity" | Romer | 3:25 |
| 3. | "Already Home" | Romer | 3:50 |
| 4. | "I Really Want It" | Romer | 3:22 |
| 5. | "Say Something" | Romer | 3:53 |
| 6. | "You'll Be Okay" | Romer | 3:58 |
| 7. | "Everyone Is Gay" | Chris Kuffner | 2:10 |
| 8. | "There Is an Answer" | Romer | 3:42 |
| 9. | "I Don't Wanna Love Somebody Else" | Romer | 2:44 |
| 10. | "This Is the New Year" | Romer; John Alagía | 3:15 |
| 11. | "Shorty Don't Wait" | Romer | 4:11 |
| 12. | "Cheer Up!" | Romer | 2:11 |
| 13. | "Say Something" (with Christina Aguilera) | Romer | 3:49 |

== Personnel ==
=== A Great Big World ===
- Ian Axel – piano, synthesizer, percussion, lead vocals
- Chad King – acoustic guitar, triangle, trumpet, lead vocals, background vocals

=== Additional musicians ===
- Christina Aguilera – duet vocals on track 13
- Chris Anderson – bass guitar
- Mike Campbell – acoustic guitar
- Andrew Duckles – viola
- Vanessa Freebairn-Smith – cello
- Rich Hinman – electric guitar
- Sean Hurley – bass guitar
- Elliot Jacobson – drums
- Zach Jones – drums, percussion
- Chris Kuffner – acoustic guitar, electric guitar
- Pete McNeal – drums
- Matt Musselman – trombone
- Zac Rae – keyboards
- Mark Robertson – violin
- Oscar Albis Rodriguez – electric guitar
- Dan Romer – bass guitar, acoustic guitar, electric guitar, organ, percussion, string arrangements

== Charts ==
=== Weekly charts ===
| Chart (2014) | Peak position |
|---|---|
| Austrian Albums (Ö3 Austria) | 36 |
| Australian Albums (ARIA) | 33 |
| Canadian Albums (Billboard) | 3 |
| Dutch Albums (Album Top 100) | 55 |
| Scottish Albums (Official Charts) | 11 |
| Swedish Albums (Sverigetopplistan) | 25 |
| UK Albums (Official Charts) | 16 |
| US Billboard 200 | 3 |

=== Year-end charts ===
| Chart (2014) | Position |
|---|---|
| US Billboard 200 | 161 |

== Release history ==
List of release dates, showing region, label, format and edition(s)
| Region | Date | Format(s) | Label | Edition(s) |
|---|---|---|---|---|
| United States | January 21, 2014 | CD; digital download | Epic | Standard |
| Canada | March 3, 2014 | CD; digital download | RCA | Standard |
