= Blessings (Futuristic album) =

Studio album by Futuristic
- Released: December 25, 2017
- Genre: Hip hop
- Length: 33:44
- Label: We're the Future
- Producer: Aphillyated; BoyLord; The Colleagues; De-Capo; ID Labs; Joey Castellani; Kojo; Tyler Rohn

Futuristic chronology
What More Could You Ask for? (2017)	Blessings (2017)	Songs About Girls (2018)

Singles from Blessings
- 1. "Epiphany" Released: March 24, 2017; 2. "Get It Together" Released: October 15, 2017; 3. "Talk" Released: December 18, 2017

Blessings is the sixth studio album by American rapper Futuristic. The album was released on Christmas Day 2017, through We're the Future Records.

== Background ==
In an interview with Complex, about his last studio album As Seen on the Internet, Futuristic said,

I really do not like my last album, no. And I don't know if it's because all the emotions that came with making it, and finishing it, and it didn't necessarily live up to what I thought it was gonna do. I think that I had a lot of eyes and a lot of ears on me, and I don't think I delivered what I should have, because I was caught up in this idea that I had already had for years, that I just finally was like, "Okay, I'ma do it this way," but it didn't really make sense anymore.

== Promotion ==
"Epiphany" was released as the lead single from the album on March 24, 2017, along with an accompanied music video. The song features guest vocals from American rapper NF.

"Get It Together" was released as the album's second single on October 15, 2017, along with an accompanied music video.

"Talk" was released as the album's third single on December 18, 2017. The song features guest vocals from American rappers Tech N9ne and Devvon Terrell.

The music videos for "Life" and "Change Somebody" were released on December 25 and January 17, 2018 respectively.

== Track listing ==
Credits are adapted from the American Society of Composers, Authors and Publishers (ASCAP).

No.	Title	Writer(s)	Producer(s)	Length
1.	"Life"	Zachary Beck; Otha Davis III; Harrison Johnson IV; Karl Powell Jr.	The Colleagues	2:52
2.	"Benz"	Beck; Eric Dan; Elias Klughammer; David Ruoff	ID Labs	3:16
3.	"Do Too Much"	Beck; Gabriel Blizman; Davis III; Powell Jr.	The Colleagues	3:30
4.	"Talk" (featuring Tech N9ne and Devvon Terrell)	Beck; Devvon McLeod; Noah Nwachukwu; Aaron Yates	De-Capo	4:20
5.	"Clock"	Beck; Davis III; Phillip Guillory; Tyler Rohn	Tyler Rohn; Aphillyated	3:31
6.	"Lights"	Beck	Kojo	3:06
7.	"Not the Vibe"	Beck; Dan; Jeremy Kulousek; Rashod Odom	ID Labs	2:47
8.	"Get It Together"	Beck; Davis III; Johnson IV; Powell Jr.	The Colleagues	5:16
9.	"Epiphany" (featuring NF)	Beck; Joseph Castellani; Nate Feuerstein	Joey Castellani	4:09
10.	"Change Somebody"	Beck	BoyLord	3:06
Total length:				33:44
