= Say Something (A Great Big World song) =

2013 single by A Great Big World and Christina Aguilera

Single by A Great Big World and Christina Aguilera

from the album Is There Anybody Out There?
- Released: September 3, 2013 (solo version); November 4, 2013 (duet version)
- Recorded: 2013
- Studio: Sear Sound (New York, NY); The Orphanage (Los Angeles, CA)
- Genre: Pop
- Length: 3:49
- Label: Epic
- Songwriters: Ian Axel; Chad King; Mike Campbell
- Producer: Dan Romer

A Great Big World singles chronology
"This Is the New Year" (2013)	"Say Something" (2013)	"Already Home" (2014)

Christina Aguilera singles chronology
"Hoy Tengo Ganas de Ti" (2013)	"Say Something" (2013)	"We Remain" (2013)

Music video
- "Say Something" on YouTube

"Say Something" is a song by American pop duo A Great Big World from their debut album, Is There Anybody Out There? (2014). Written by the duo members—Ian Axel and Chad King—alongside Mike Campbell, the song was originally recorded by Axel for his solo album This Is the New Year (2011). It was later released as a single by the duo on September 3, 2013, by Epic Records. Following its usage on American reality TV show So You Think You Can Dance, the track gained attention from singer Christina Aguilera, who wanted to collaborate with A Great Big World on the song. Soon afterwards, a re-recorded version of "Say Something" with Aguilera was released on November 4, 2013.

"Say Something" is a slow-tempo piano ballad that talks about a breakup, where the lover is implored to say something because the singer is giving up on them, with the singers expressing humility, sadness, and regret. In the single version with Aguilera, she plays a ghost of the lover to whom the song is addressed as she traces the steps of the lead vocal. The song was praised by music critics for its lyrics, composition and Aguilera's vocal delivery. At the 57th Annual Grammy Awards, the song earned A Great Big World and Aguilera a Grammy Award for Best Pop Duo/Group Performance.

"Say Something" did not sell significantly well until the version with Aguilera was available. It debuted at number 16 on the Billboard Hot 100 chart after A Great Big World and Aguilera performed the song on The Voice. It eventually peaked at number four and has since sold over ten million copies in the United States. It also topped the singles charts in Australia, the Flanders region of Belgium, and Canada, while reaching top 5 in Austria, Israel, New Zealand, Sweden and the United Kingdom. A music video was released on November 19, 2013, featuring the trio singing as people "act out the heartbreaking lyrics." To further promote "Say Something", A Great Big World and Aguilera performed the track at the American Music Awards of 2013. Numerous covers of the song were released, including those by Luke Evans and Nicole Kidman, and Tiësto.

== Background and release ==
"Say Something" was originally released on February 8, 2011, on band member Ian Axel's solo album This Is the New Year with the song featuring harmonies by guest vocalist Jenny Owen Youngs, but the track went largely unnoticed until it received attention after being used on the TV series So You Think You Can Dance on season 10's semi final episode contemporary dance routine by the eventual champion Amy Yakima. This sparked a chain reaction that eventually made its way to Christina Aguilera. "'Say Something' was danced to on So You Think You Can Dance almost two months ago, and so many people responded to it," Axel tells Billboard. "In that whole process, someone on our team played it for someone on Christina's team, and we got a call that Christina wanted to record it, and then, literally a week later, we were in L.A. recording it with her." The pair considers Aguilera as having "one of the top voices in the world," says Chad King, and re-recorded "Say Something" with her in two hours. "We look at Christina as this icon who can say anything and make it sound amazing," says King.

About approaching the duo to re-record the track, Aguilera said, "Somebody sent me the song (...) and it's just the most simplest song that doesn't have to fit a formula to be heard and to be appreciated, so I just heard it and I've never done anything like this before and I was just like, 'You know', I just started to hear a harmony part over it and I was like, 'get in touch with these guys and see if they wanna get in the studio and sit behind the piano and just vibe together and see what happens...' and we did, and they're so humble, so sweet, so down to earth, and I'm all about that and supporting that, and we came together so organically and it was fun." Aguilera also added, "It's so quiet and still and steady and in a way pleading," she describes the song. "I'm only taking on projects that feel good to me and represent, as always, a purpose of the here and now in my life."

== Composition and lyrics ==
"Say Something"
A 23-second sample of "Say Something".

"Say Something" was written by Ian Axel, Chad King, and Mike Campbell while production was handled by Dan Romer. Sonically, the piano ballad is underlined by a piano and string arrangement, which was performed by Los Angeles string players Mark Robertson, Andrew Duckles, and Vanessa Freebairn-Smith. The lyrics evoke the emotion felt when choosing to leave a failed relationship even though love still remains, imploring the lover say something because the singer is giving up on them.

For Bill Lamb of About.com, the chorus "Say something, I'm giving up on you", "is brilliant." Lamb also explained the song, writing that, "instead of being filled with anger and desperation, it is a song expressing a powerful combination of humility, sadness and regret." The song was written at a time when both members were experiencing individual heartbreak. "Writing the song was part of the healing process," says Axel. "Whenever we perform it, it's like revisiting the scar. It's always a part of me, and I can always go there and feel it." Lewis Corner of Digital Spy noted that with its "stripped-down melody and emotive lyrics", the song becomes the antithesis of the club-thumping blow-outs radio currently prefers."

The song is written in the key of D major.

== Critical response ==
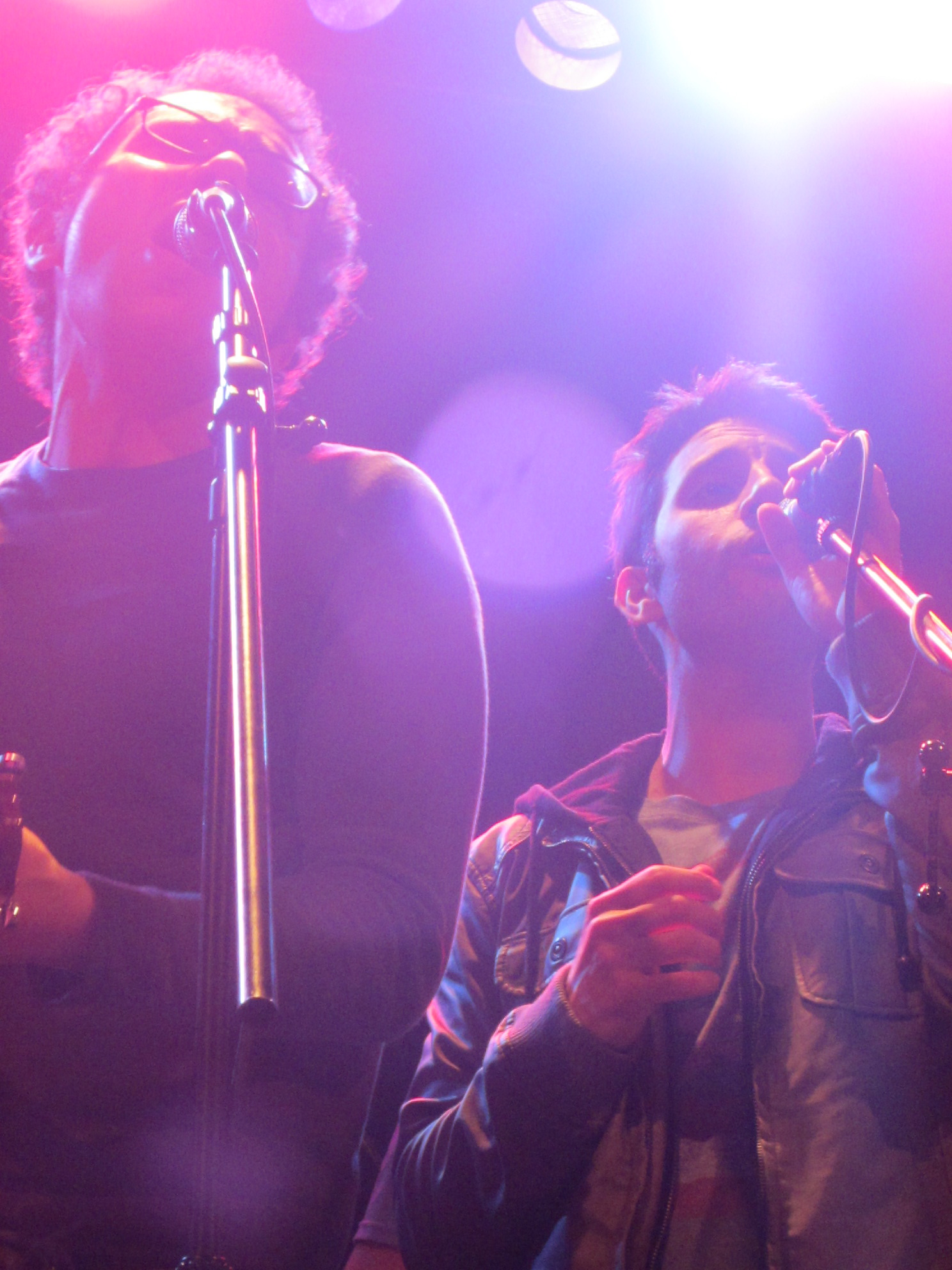
The personal lyrics, written by the band members (pictured), were highly praised by critics.

Rick Florino of Artist Direct gave the song five out of five stars, calling it "Oscar-worthy", with "a cinematic heft to the track that makes it utterly vivid and vibrant." Florino also praised Aguilera's performance, calling it "one of her best ever, fortifying the hook and harmony masterfully." Writing for The New Orleans Advocate, Keith Spera opined that the song is "a forthright, unadorned break-up ballad". Lewis Corner of Digital Spy praised Aguilera for "reminding us why she always sounds infinitely better when heading up a ballad", calling it "a beautifully simplistic ode to heartache that evidently connects."

Robert Copsey also of Digital Spy called it "one of [Aguilera's] most understated outings in recent memory, and it's all the better for it." Jon O'Brien of Yahoo! Music noted that the song features Aguilera's "most restrained and indeed impressive vocal in years", calling the song " as emotive as it is theatrical." Melinda Newman of HitFix praised Aguilera for "show[ing] admirable restraint vocally, beautifully pairing with Axel's vocals." Bradley Stern of MuuMuse praised the "slow, sad piano melody", the "mournful strings," calling it "a haunting production – made even better by the Stripped diva, proving once again that less is often more." Stern also praised Aguilera for showing a simple side of her voice, writing that she "doesn't even have her own verse or chorus – she resigns to delivering subtle, yet effective, backing vocals for the entirety of the re-recording. It's only in the song's final few moments that she allows her powerhouse pipes to blow in the background. And those whispers at the very end? 'Say something, I'm giving up on you...' Gulp."

Alfred Soto of Billboard, Spin and the Village Voice rated the song 1 out of 10, writing " Of course he feels small and is giving up on her and it’s over his head — who wants that voice over that piano?". Crystal Leww of Pitchfork wrote "The line “Say something, I’m giving up on you” is desperate and lonely in the best of ways. The rest of this is saccharine and clichéd in the worst." Josh Langhoff of the Village Voice criticized the song's saccharine quality and Aguilera's performance, writing "I’m sure Xtina could still be a potent force in the culture, though I couldn’t hum anything more recent than “Keeps Gettin’ Better,” but hopping aboard this song feels like a gruesome mix of hauteur and desperation to read her name in Billboard. We wouldn’t be talking about “Say Something” if not for her, so her largesse counts for something. But these guys landed a tune on Glee, and they could’ve won over The Voice‘s audience without her breathy solemnities in the background. Up and coming soft poppers, they’re in no position to refuse a favor. I’m worried, though, that they make that Five For Fighting guy look like an austere sonofabitch." Brad Shoup of Pitchfork panned the song, writing "A compelling portrait of a sociopath who knows he’s about to utterly dominate yet another game of emotional chicken, “Say Something” is the sound of someone who only knows how to fall in love with Sigur Rós videos. It’s goosed by the name, if not the presence, of La Aguilera; she’s so tiny here, it’s as if she’s echoing her lover’s words on the drive home, cratered by the idea that she gave herself for so long to something so monstrous. Great work, all.".

== Chart performance ==
=== United States ===
"We still can't even believe that this happened. We can hardly put it into words. Not only did we get to perform on The Voice, but we were honored to do so alongside one of the best voices in the world, 'Christina Aguilera'. We're grateful to all of our fans around the globe who have connected with the song so closely."

— The duo impressed with the success of the song.

The original version of the song had sold only 52,000 downloads before the version with Christina Aguilera was released, according to Nielsen SoundScan. "Say Something" debuted at number 16 on the Billboard Hot 100 chart, following the impact of the performance on The Voice, as the song started at number-one on Digital Songs with 189,000 sold, with the remix featuring Aguilera accounting for 86% of the song's overall download sales in the chart's tracking week. The song was also a success on the Canadian Hot 100, debuting at number 9 and peaking at number one.

After the performance on the AMAs, the song jumped to number 3 on the Digital Songs chart, with 197,000 copies. It also jumped from number 18 to number 10 on the Billboard Hot 100 chart, becoming A Great Big World's first top-ten single and Aguilera's 11th top ten and second in 2013 (with the other being "Feel This Moment" at number eight), becoming the second time she achieved multiple top 10s in a single year, with the first being in 2000, when 'What a Girl Wants' (number-one for two weeks), 'I Turn to You' (number three) and 'Come On Over Baby (All I Want Is You)' (number-one for four weeks), all from her self-titled debut album, reached the top tier. The song is also Aguilera's first top 10 with lead billing since October 2008, when her single "Keeps Gettin' Better" debuted at its number seven peak.

"Say Something" also became Epic's first top-ten hit since 2008 with You Found Me by The Fray. "Say Something" peaked at number 4 on the chart in the sixth week of release, with 39 million radio plays and sales of 233,000 copies for the week. The following week, the song sold 355,000 downloads and climbed to number 14 on Radio Songs, although it fell to number five. In February 2014, the song reached the Radio Songs top 10, becoming the band's first top 10 and Aguilera's ninth, marking her first Radio Songs top 10 in a lead role since "Beautiful" in 2003. The song reached its 3 million sales mark in February 2014, and was certified triple platinum on March 5, 2014. In June of the same year, the single was certified 4× Platinum. As of December 2014, the song had sold about 4 million copies in the US. In November 2026, the single was certified Diamond in the United States for sales in excess of 10 million units.

=== Australia and Europe ===
In Australia, "Say Something" debuted at number 47 on the week of December 29, 2013. Later, it re-entered at number 45, on January 19, 2014. The song went to jump from number 50 to number 9, on the week of February 2, 2014, until it reached the top of the ARIA Charts on the week February 16, 2014. It became A Great Big World's first number-one single and Aguilera's third number-one single (the last being "Beautiful" in 2003). The song became Aguilera's 18th Top 10 single in Australia, her last entry was on the Pitbull song "Feel This Moment" which made it to number six in March 2013. In New Zealand, the single debuted at number 18, on December 16, 2013, while on February 10, 2014, the song reached a peak of number two; Aguilera's highest charting-single since her collaboration with Maroon 5 in "Moves Like Jagger" (2011), and her 14th top-five single.

In Europe, the song managed to become a huge success. In Austria, the song peaked at number four on the Austrian Singles Chart, while in Norway, the song peaked at number eight on the Norwegian Singles Chart and in Sweden, "Say Something" became a success, peaking at number four on the Swedish Singles Chart. In other countries, "Say Something" was a moderate success, where in Spain, it peaked at number 24, in Switzerland, the song reached a peak of number 31 and in France, the song is currently at number 29, as of March 1, 2014. In the United Kingdom, "Say Something" debuted and peaked at number four on the UK Singles Chart, becoming Aguilera's 24th Top 40 hit in Britain and A Great Big World's debut there.

== Music video ==
A music video, directed by Christopher Sims, was already shot on November 8, 2013, with Aguilera posting a picture of her standing next to a piano, where the duo is playing the track, to her Twitter, Facebook and Instagram page. The music video, which was shot in Los Angeles, was released on November 19, 2013, exclusively on Entertainment Tonight, while VEVO premiered the video on November 20, 2013. The video features Aguilera in a simple black dress and natural make-up, reminiscent of her "Beautiful" days, according to MTV's Natasha Chandel. In the video, the trio perform the ballad as people — a child whose parents won't stop fighting, a young couple lying coldly side by side, an older man bidding his dying wife goodbye — act out the heartbreaking lyrics.

=== Reception ===
The scene where Christina Aguilera is shown with tears welling in her eyes was praised by critics and fans alike due to her delivery.

The video received widespread acclaim from critics. For Jason Lipshut of Billboard Magazine, "Aguilera and AGBW's Ian Axel look utterly sorrowful as they croon the break-up ballad together, with Axel carefully pounding away at the grand piano and Aguilera appearing on the verge of tears as the song reaches its climax. Meanwhile, various tear-inducing images accompany the majestic track, often in slow motion – most strikingly, an older man climbing into a hospital bed with his peaceful female counterpart and emitting a silent shout." Peter Gicas of E! Online praised Aguilera's emotion on the video, writing that she "serves up a certain subtleness to the clip, which is definitely appropriate given the tone of both the ballad and the video itself." Bradley Stern of MuuMuse agreed, writing that, "Armed with nothing else but a piano and an old bed frame by her side, the 'Lotus' legend bares her soul and gives you pure Stripped-era vulnerability, conjuring the simple-yet-effective one-take video for 'The Voice Within.' No over-the-top diva theatrics, no wigs — just raw emotion and a genuinely powerful performance."

John Walker of MTV Buzzworthy called the video "equal parts tragically beautiful and beautifully tragic. Like, hand us a bucket, because we are ugly-crying from our eyes, noses, mouths, ears, and at least 17 other places where tear ducts biologically shouldn't be located.” Natasha Chandel of MTV praised "a rare moment, when Xtina breaks down on camera as the hook, 'Say something, I'm giving up on you' crescendos, exposing a tender side to the singer that we haven't seen since her album Stripped.

== Live performances ==
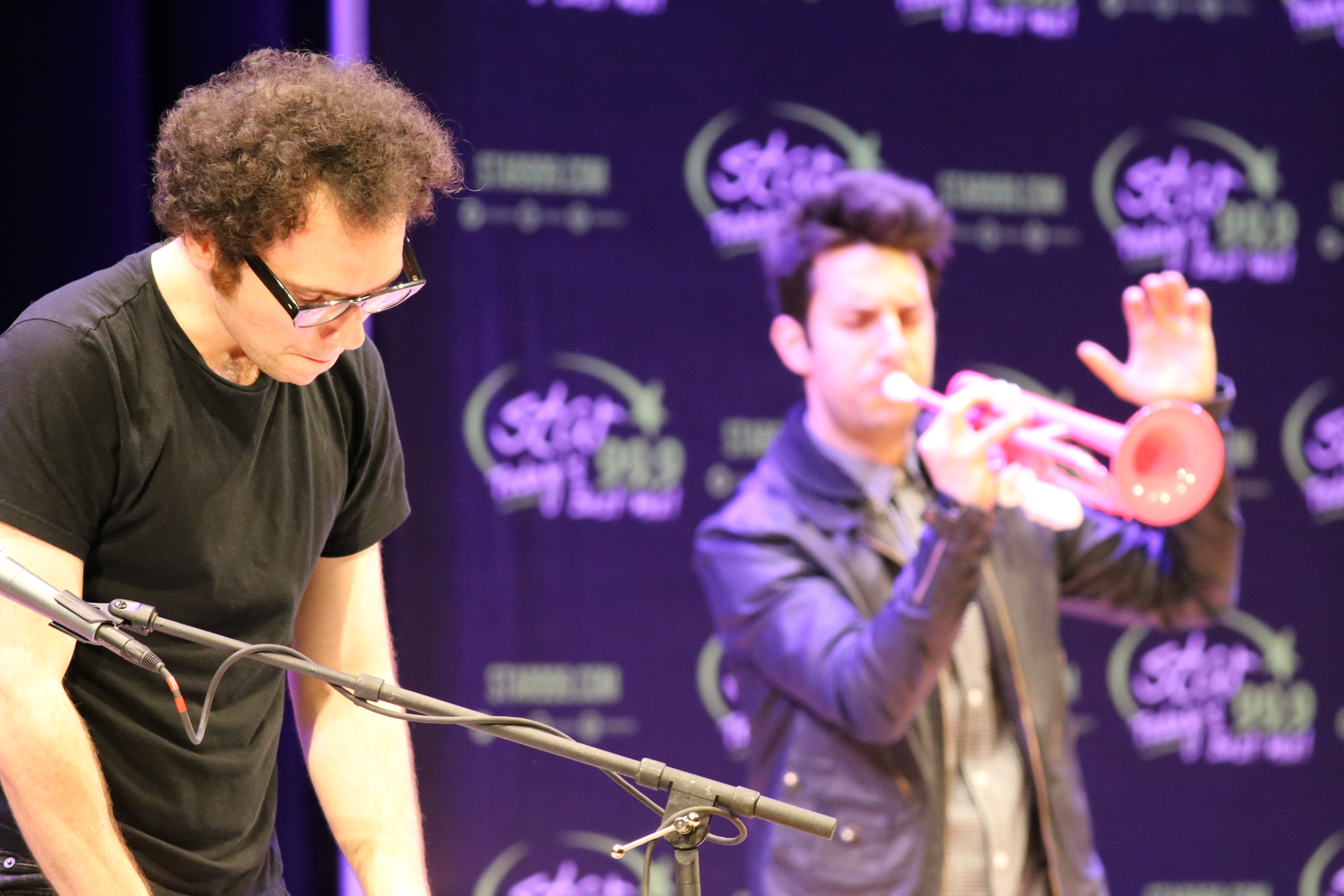
A Great Big World performing "Say Something" at Jonathan Law High School in Milford, Connecticut in May 2013

On November 5, 2013, on the 14th episode from the fifth season of The Voice, Christina Aguilera (one of the competition's coaches) performed "Say Something" with A Great Big World. The performance consisted of a piano, some strings and a keyboard for instrumentation, while Aguilera "reining in her voice's natural power", according to Billboard's Jason Lipshutz. The performance was lauded by critics and other artists, such as OneRepublic, Christina Perri, Ingrid Michaelson, Cee Lo Green and Carson Daly. Caila Ball of Idolator wrote that, "She was legendary, obviously." Michelle Stark of Tampa Bay Times wrote the performance "gives us all of the goosebumps." Douglas Cobb of Las Vegas Guardian Express called it "a very emotional, low-key, cool performance. It was a very tender, touching song — Christina did great, as usual, singing it." Bradley Stern of MuuMuse called the performance "perfect", writing that, "Christina keeps it as stripped as the studio version, allowing her naturally beautiful vocals to sound a whole lot more vulnerable than usual. The result? One powerful, devastating performance – you'll be seeing your reflejo in the tears streaming down your face in no time."

A Great Big World and Aguilera also performed the song at the 2013 American Music Awards on November 24, 2013. With her hair in a braid and wearing a muted black dress, Aguilera sang an original verse midway through the performance, which included a string section and a fairly bare stage. With A Great Big World's Chad King manning the keyboard, the group's Ian Axel sat at the grand piano and stamped his feet furiously as 'Say Something' approached its emotional climax," according to Billboard's Jason Lipshutz. Lindsay Dreyer of Wetpaint wrote that "Taking her rightful place center stage in a floor-length black dress and braided updo, the 32-year-old pop diva harmonized perfectly with the group's lead singer Ian Axel, who worked the piano with passion and poise. Xtina's rich yet breathy tone offered just the right amount of strength and vulnerability — a side of Christina we haven't seen in a really long time." Dreyer finished the review stating, "If tonight's AMA performance is any indication, Christina is on the brink of a major music comeback — and we can't wait!." The band also performed the song at the 2013 Victoria's Secret Fashion Show on December 10, 2013. However, Aguilera did not perform the song with them as a duet, due to scheduling conflicts of The Voice. Aguilera also performed the song in Malaysia in a private concert without the band on March 28. The duo and Aguilera also performed the song during the New Orleans Jazz Festival. She gave a one-and-a-half-hour-long show and then invited the band to perform the song in front of a large crowd on May 2, 2014. The band (sans Aguilera) sang the song on the September 6 episode of Last Week Tonight in a duet with comedian John Oliver to mourn the loss of the Russian space geckos.

The song was performed live on the premiere episode of Late Night with Seth Meyers on February 24, 2014. In July 2021, Aguilera performed "Say Something" for two nights at the Hollywood Bowl with Gustavo Dudamel and the Los Angeles Philharmonic.

== Cover versions ==
=== Tiësto version ===
"Say Something"

Single by Tiësto featuring Emily Rowed

from the album A Town Called Paradise
- Released: August 25, 2014
- Genre: Dance-pop
- Length: 4:48
- Label: Musical Freedom; Casablanca; Republic; Universal
- Songwriters: Ian Axel; Chad King; Mike Campbell
- Producer: Tiësto

Tiësto singles chronology
"Let's Go" (2014)	"Say Something" (2014)	"Light Years Away" (2014)

Emily Rowed singles chronology
"Say Something" (2014)	"Rubies" (2018)

Dutch disc jockey and producer Tiësto included a cover version of "Say Something" as bonus track from a special version of his 2014 album A Town Called Paradise. The vocals are provided by Canadian singer Emily Rowed. The song was released as a single on August 25, 2014 only in the United States.

==== Track listing ====
Digital Download (US)

1. "Say Something" - 3:22

==== Charts ====
Chart (2014)	Peak position
US Hot Dance/Electronic Songs (Billboard)	20

=== Other versions ===
American pop duo Alex & Sierra performed the song twice on third season of The X Factor (U.S.), where they were contestants and eventually won the show. During the sixth week, the duo performed the song for the first time, with Sierra on the piano and Alex on guitar. The performance was praised by the judges, with Kelly Rowland, one of them, feeling like she was watching an awards show performance. Catriona Wightman of Digital Spy called it "pretty simple, but showed how genuinely talented they are." The cover version of the song surpassed A Great Big World and Aguilera's version on iTunes, climbing to number 1 the morning after they sang it onstage. Series creator and head judge Simon Cowell, who mentored the group, claimed that the duo success is proof that the show is still capable of turning small-town kids into bankable stars. The duo performed the song once again on the finale of the show, eventually winning the competition.

American progressive metal band Redemption includes their own cover version of the song on the vinyl version of their album The Art of Loss. On January 19, 2014, The Voice of the Philippines coaches Sarah Geronimo and Bamboo performed their own rendition of the song on ABS-CBN's Sunday variety show ASAP 19. Right after the performance, the hashtag 'SaySomethingAshBoo' trended on Twitter. Joe Brooks and Tammin Sursok released a pop rock version of the song on March 29, 2014, as a single. The song was released under Independent record label Fantastik Music and was distributed by TuneCore. Jackie Evancho and Cheyenne Jackson performed the song on August 21, 2014, at Longwood Gardens, as part of the recording of the PBS special "Jackie Evancho: Awakening – Live in Concert" supporting Evancho's "Awakening" album and tour.

Collabro, the winners of the 2014 edition of Britain's Got Talent, performed the song at the Royal Variety Performance on December 8, 2014. Polish singer Łukasz Tokarski covered the song in 2017, and Johnny Mathis also covered "Say Something" for his 2017 album Johnny Mathis Sings the Great New American Songbook. KZ Tandingan was the fourth person to perform such song on Singer 2018 where she ranked fourth on Episode 7. Pentatonix covered the song on their 2014 studio album PTX, Vols. 1 & 2, reaching No. 89 on the Canadian Hot 100.

Kelly Clarkson covered the song in her own talk show on August 13, 2020.

On the first episode of the fourth season of The Masked Singer, Clint Black and Lisa Hartman Black, covered the song, "Say Something", on September 23, 2020. They performed masked as the Snow Owls.

Luke Evans covered the song for his second studio album A Song for You. It was recorded as a duet with Nicole Kidman and released as a single in October 2022.

== In other media ==
- The song's opening piano riff was combined with a soundbyte from an interview of Katy Perry on the Australian talk show The Project in 2014. The combined sound was used as a meme in Vine.
- The original version of the song is featured in NCIS, in the episode number 291 (season 13, episode 9) titled "Day in Court".
- The instrumental version and first version of the song appears in the series finale episode of Suburgatory ("Stiiiiiiill Horny").
- The song is featured in the movie Perdona Si Te Llamo Amor, released on June 19, 2014.
- The song is heard in the first theatrical trailer for the film adaptation of Gayle Forman's novel, If I Stay.
- The song was used in the season 5 finale of Rookie Blue, a Canadian television police drama.
- The song is heard in the episode 4 of season one of Red Band Society.
- The original version of the song, without Christina Aguilera, is used in a season 19 episode of South Park; the episode was entitled "Tweek x Craig".
- The song is featured in a trailer for the movie The 33.
- The original version of the song is featured at the end of episode 4, titled "Secrets and Lies", from season 8 of Heartland.
- The song is featured at the end of the season five finale of Republic of Doyle ("Buried").
- The song was featured in the Chinese drama Meteor Garden 2018.
- The instrumental version of the song was featured in Google's 2020 Super Bowl commercial titled "Loretta".
- The song is featured in episode 3 ("Zoey's Extraordinary Dreams"), season 2 of Zoey's Extraordinary Playlist, sung by Max (Skylar Astin).
- The instrumental version of the song was used on 1 April 2014 in Hollyoaks, a British Soap Opera.
- The original version appears in the 2015 Polish film 'Listy Do M 2' (Letters to Santa 2).

== Track listing and formats ==
Solo version digital download

1. "Say Something" – 3:53

Duet version digital download

1. "Say Something" – 3:53

== Charts and certifications ==
=== Weekly charts ===
Weekly chart performance
Chart (2013–2014)	Peak position
Australia (ARIA)	1
Austria (Ö3 Austria Top 40)	4
Belgium (Ultratop 50 Flanders)	1
Belgium (Ultratop 50 Wallonia)	15
Canada Hot 100 (Billboard)	1
Canada AC (Billboard)	1
Canada CHR/Top 40 (Billboard)	9
Canada Hot AC (Billboard)	6
CIS Airplay (TopHit)	189
Czech Republic Airplay (ČNS IFPI)	8
Czech Republic Singles Digital (ČNS IFPI)	91
Denmark (Tracklisten)	18
Euro Digital Song Sales (Billboard)	5
Finland (Suomen virallinen lista)	11
Finland Airplay (Radiosoittolista)	63
France (SNEP)	29
Germany (GfK)	36
Hungary (Single Top 40)	38
Ireland (IRMA)	6
Israel International Airplay (Media Forest)	5
Italy (FIMI)	47
Japan Hot 100 (Billboard)	67
Malaysia (Music Weekly Asia)	2
Netherlands (Dutch Top 40)	19
Netherlands (Single Top 100)	6
New Zealand (Recorded Music NZ)	2
Norway (VG-lista)	8
Portugal Digital Song Sales (Billboard)	3
Romania (Airplay 100)	66
Scottish Singles Sales (Official Charts)	2
Singapore (Music Weekly Asia)	1
Slovakia Airplay (ČNS IFPI)	8
Slovakia Singles Digital (ČNS IFPI)	95
Spain (Promusicae)	24
Sweden (Sverigetopplistan)	4
Switzerland (Schweizer Hitparade)	20
UK Singles (Official Charts)	4
US Billboard Hot 100	4
US Adult Alternative Airplay (Billboard)	30
US Adult Contemporary (Billboard)	3
US Adult Pop Airplay (Billboard)	1
US Dance Club Songs (Billboard)	1
US Pop Airplay (Billboard)	7

=== Year-end charts ===
Annual chart rankings
Chart (2014)	Position
Australia (ARIA)	13
Austria (Ö3 Austria Top 40)	38
Belgium (Ultratop Flanders)	12
Belgium (Ultratop Wallonia)	64
Canada (Canadian Hot 100)	10
France (SNEP)	102
Netherlands (Dutch Top 40)	97
Netherlands (Single Top 100)	86
New Zealand (Recorded Music NZ)	7
Sweden (Sverigetopplistan)	46
UK Singles (Official Charts Company)	31
US Billboard Hot 100	17
US Adult Contemporary (Billboard)	12
US Adult Top 40 (Billboard)	18
US Hot Dance Club Songs (Billboard)	29
US Mainstream Top 40 (Billboard)	34

=== Certifications ===
Certifications and sales
Region	Certification	Certified units/sales
Australia (ARIA)	4× Platinum	280,000^{^}
Austria (IFPI Austria)	Gold	15,000^{*}
Belgium (BRMA)	Gold	15,000^{*}
Canada (Music Canada)	6× Platinum	480,000^{*}
Denmark (IFPI Danmark)	2× Platinum	180,000^{‡}
Germany (BVMI)	Platinum	600,000^{‡}
Italy (FIMI)	2× Platinum	100,000^{‡}
Mexico (AMPROFON)	Gold	30,000^{*}
New Zealand (RMNZ)	4× Platinum	120,000^{‡}
Norway (IFPI Norway)	4× Platinum	40,000^{‡}
Portugal (AFP)	Platinum	20,000^{‡}
Spain (Promusicae)	2× Platinum	120,000^{‡}
Sweden (GLF)	2× Platinum	80,000^{‡}
Switzerland (IFPI Switzerland)	Gold	15,000^{^}
United Kingdom (BPI)	3× Platinum	1,800,000^{‡}
United States (RIAA)	Diamond	10,000,000^{‡}
Streaming
Denmark (IFPI Danmark)	Platinum	2,600,000^{†}
^{*} Sales figures based on certification alone.^{^} Shipments figures based on certification alone.^{‡} Sales+streaming figures based on certification alone.^{†} Streaming-only figures based on certification alone.

== Release history ==
Street dates
Region	Date	Version(s)	Format	Distributor
Belgium	September 3, 2013	Solo	Digital download	Epic Records
Finland	September 3, 2013	Solo	Digital download	Epic Records
Luxembourg	September 3, 2013	Solo	Digital download	Epic Records
Portugal	September 3, 2013	Solo	Digital download	Epic Records
Switzerland	September 3, 2013	Solo	Digital download	Epic Records
Spain	September 3, 2013	Solo	Digital download	Epic Records
United States	September 3, 2013	Solo	Digital download	Epic Records
Belgium	November 4, 2013	Duet	Digital download	Epic Records
Finland	November 4, 2013	Duet	Digital download	Epic Records
Germany	November 4, 2013	Duet	Digital download	Sony Music Entertainment
Portugal	November 4, 2013	Duet	Digital download	Epic Records
Sweden	November 4, 2013	Duet	Digital download	Epic Records
Switzerland	November 4, 2013	Duet	Digital download	Epic Records
Spain	November 4, 2013	Duet	Digital download	Epic Records
United States	November 4, 2013	Duet	Digital download	Epic Records
Germany	December 13, 2013	Duet and solo	CD single	Sony BMG
United Kingdom	February 16, 2014	Duet and solo	Digital download	Epic Records

== See also ==
- "Fall on Me" (2019), another A Great Big World's collaboration with Christina Aguilera
- List of number-one dance singles of 2014 (U.S.)
- List of Billboard Hot 100 top 10 singles in 2013
- List of Billboard Hot 100 top 10 singles in 2014
