= A Great Big World =

American pop rock musical duo

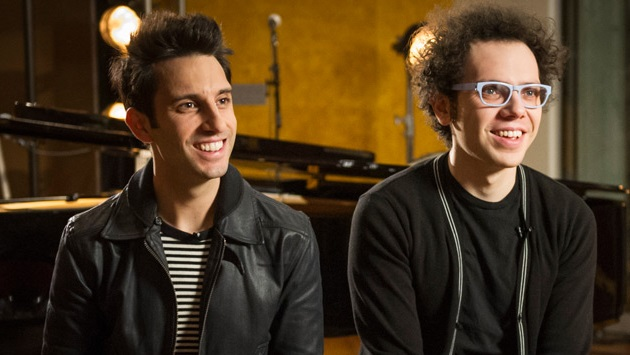
- A Great Big World in 2014

Background information
- Origin: New York City, US
- Genres: Pop rock; pop
- Years active: 2011–present
- Label: Epic
- Members: Ian Axel; Chad King (né Vaccarino)
- Website: agreatbigworld.com

A Great Big World is an American musical duo from New York made up of singer/songwriters Ian Axel and Chad King. The group is best known for their single "This Is the New Year", which was performed by the cast in an episode of Glee and reached the Billboard Mainstream Top 40 chart in May 2013, and their worldwide hit "Say Something", particularly after recording it as a duet collaboration with Christina Aguilera. The Diamond-certified duet peaked at number four on the Billboard Hot 100.

== Career ==
=== Early beginnings ===
Ian Axel and Chad King met at New York University, where they were attending the Steinhardt Music Program. Both were music business students and Axel is said to have convinced King to write a song together. King agreed to work with Axel after hearing him sing. They both wrote and performed songs together prior to Axel embarking on a solo career in which he released an independent album featuring songs that were all co-written by King.

=== 2011–2013: Breakthrough and Glee ===
In 2011, their song "This Is the New Year" was licensed to various television networks and was used as the theme song for MTV's I Used to Be Fat as well as being featured on The Amazing Race, ESPN, One Tree Hill, and Good Morning America. Ian Axel and Chad King went on national tour and performed as the openers for Ingrid Michaelson, Matthew Morrison (Glee), and Five for Fighting.

The duo re-branded itself in 2012, when they took the official name A Great Big World. They released a six-song EP after obtaining funding from the crowdsource funding website Kickstarter.

In 2013, "This Is the New Year" was performed by the cast in an episode of Glee.

=== 2013–2014: Is There Anybody Out There? ===
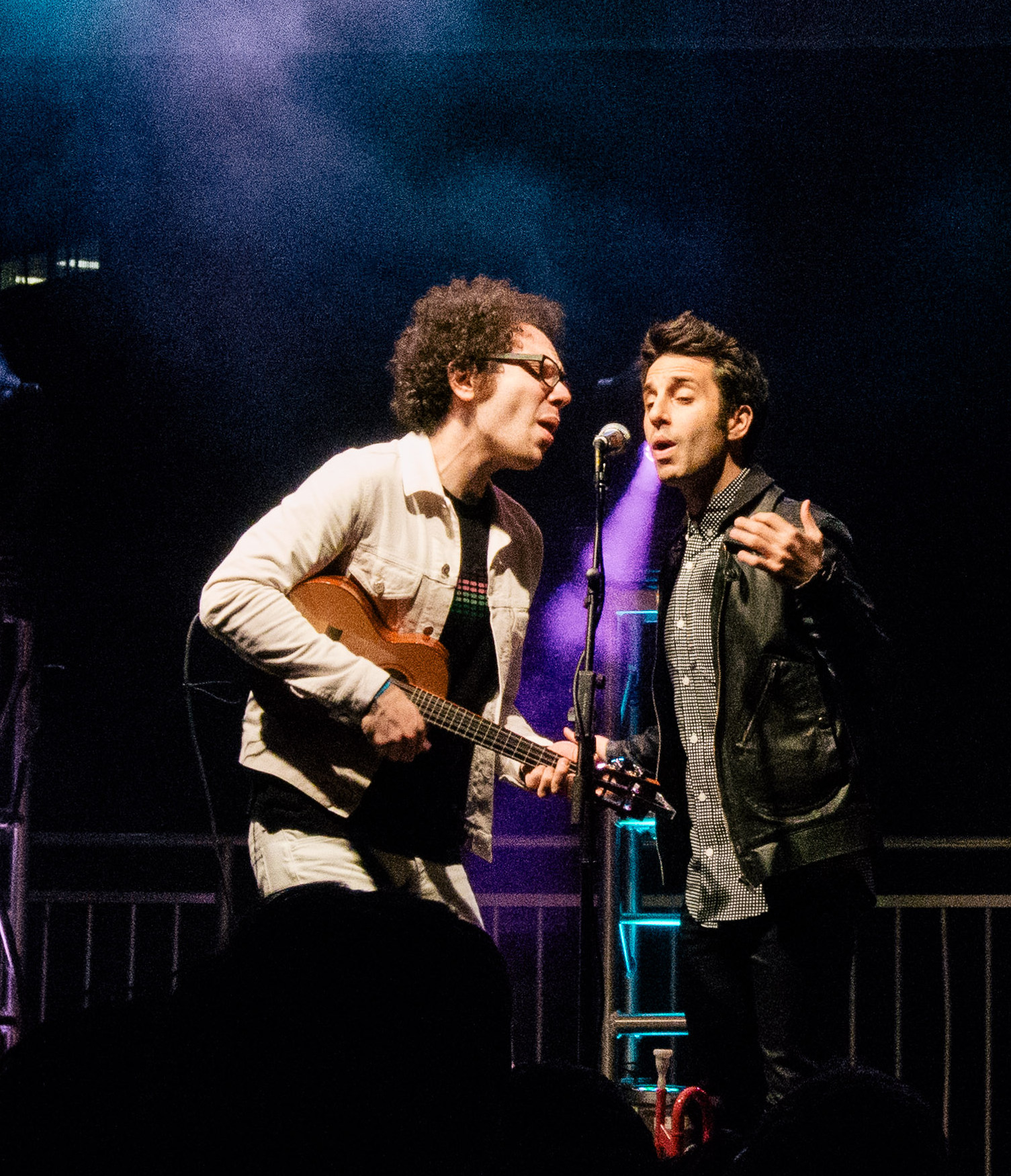
A Great Big World performing in April 2014

In 2013, the group signed with Epic Records and released a three-song EP under the Epic label in May 2013. They completed a headline tour in conjunction with their EP release.

In June 2013, they were picked as Elvis Duran's Artist of the Month and were featured on NBC's Today where they performed live their song "This Is the New Year". The song "Say Something" was featured in the final episode of the US dance competition So You Think You Can Dance on September 3, 2013, and released digitally the same day. It climbed to number 20 on iTunes in the United States the next day. The song was subsequently re-recorded featuring Christina Aguilera after she heard the song, and this version was released on November 4, 2013, and that version reached number 1 on the iTunes charts. The following evening, A Great Big World and Aguilera gave the premiere live TV performance of the song on the NBC television series The Voice. The song reached No. 1 on the digital song chart the next day with 189,000 copies sold for the week. The video was released on November 19, 2013. In November 2013, it was announced that A Great Big World would be performing at the annual Victoria's Secret Fashion Show. The same month, they performed for the first time at the American Music Awards with Aguilera.

Their debut album, Is There Anybody Out There?, was released on January 21, 2014.

The group made an appearance on the song "Over You" on Ingrid Michaelson's 2014 album, Lights Out.

"Say Something" was also used in the nineteenth season of South Park (Episode 6) Titled "Tweek x Craig". In September 2014 the band performed the "Say Something" on Last Week Tonight with John Oliver.

The group opened for Los Angeles-based recording artist Hughie Stone Fish on the "Siren Songs" tour in September 2014.

=== 2015: When the Morning Comes ===
On April 21, 2015, it was announced through the A Great Big World Facebook page that Ian and Chad were working on a second album. The group announced the release of their first single off of the new album via Instagram in mid-July. The single "Hold Each Other" was released on July 22, 2015, featuring the rapper Futuristic. The non-rap version was released on July 24, 2015. The album was released on November 13, 2015, with the title When the Morning Comes. While visiting the UK in June 2015 they recorded at Sarm Studios in London. Several musicians and producers collaborated on the album including Dave Eggar, Derek Fuhrmann, Gregg Wattenberg, Greg Holden, Kevin Kadish, Josh Kear, Dan Romer, and Mozella.

They have been writing a musical for several years. The show is about family and is called Strokes of Genius.

== Discography ==
=== Studio albums ===
Title	Album details	Peak chart positions						Sales
Title	Album details	US	AUS	AUT	CAN	SWE	UK	Sales
Is There Anybody Out There?	Released: January 21, 2014; Label: Epic; Format: Digital download, CD	3	33	36	3	25	16	US: 165,000
When the Morning Comes	Released: November 13, 2015; Label: Epic; Format: Digital download, CD	75	—	—	—	—	—	
Particles	Released: August 27, 2021; Label: Independent; Format: Digital download	—	—	—	—	—	—	
"—" denotes a single that did not chart or was not released in that territory.

=== Singles ===
Year	Single	Peak chart positions										Sales	Certifications	Album
Year	Single	US	US Adult	AUS	AUT	CAN	IRE	JPN	NZ	SWE	UK	Sales	Certifications	Album
2013	"This Is the New Year"	—	39	—	—	—	—	—	—	—	—			Is There Anybody Out There?
2013	"Say Something" (with Christina Aguilera)	4	1	1	4	1	6	36	2	4	4	US: 3,859,000	RIAA: Diamond; ARIA: 4× Platinum; BPI: 3× Platinum; MC: 6× Platinum; RMNZ: 4× Platinum	Is There Anybody Out There?
2014	"Already Home"	—	24	—	—	—	—	—	—	—	—			Is There Anybody Out There?
2014	"Rockstar"	—	—	—	—	—	—	86	—	—	—			Is There Anybody Out There?
2015	"Hold Each Other" (featuring Futuristic)	99	12	—	—	69	—	—	—	—	—			When the Morning Comes
2016	"Oasis"	—	22	—	—	—	—	—	—	—	—			When the Morning Comes
2016	"Won't Stop Running"	—	34	—	—	—	—	—	—	—	—			When the Morning Comes
2017	"When I Was a Boy"	—	—	—	—	—	—	—	—	—	—			Non-album singles
2018	"Younger"	—	18	—	—	—	—	—	—	—	—			Non-album singles
2018	"You"	—	39	—	—	—	—	—	—	—	—			Non-album singles
2019	"This Is Magic"	—	—	—	—	—	—	—	—	—	—			Non-album singles
2019	"Boys in the Street"	—	—	—	—	—	—	—	—	—	—			Non-album singles
2019	"Fall on Me" (with Christina Aguilera)	—	37	—	—	—	—	—	—	—	—			Particles
2020	"I Will Always Be There"	—	—	—	—	—	—	—	—	—	—			Non-album single
2021	"Boys in the Street (2021)"	—	—	—	—	—	—	—	—	—	—			Particles
2021	"Glowing"	—	—	—	—	—	—	—	—	—	—			Particles
2021	"Mama"	—	—	—	—	—	—	—	—	—	—			Particles
2023	"Nothing's Impossible" (with Rachel Platten)	—	—	—	—	—	—	—	—	—	—			The Imaginary
2025	"Then There Were Sparks"	—	—	—	—	—	—	—	—	—	—			Non-album single
"—" denotes a single that did not chart or was not released in that territory.

=== Music videos ===
Year	Song	Director
2013	"This Is the New Year"	Leiv Parton
2013	"Say Something" (with Christina Aguilera)	Christopher Sims
2014	"Already Home"	Isaac Rentz
2014	"I Want a Hippopotamus for Christmas"	Rohitash Rao
2015	"Hold Each Other" (featuring FUTURISTIC)	Marc Klasfeld
2016	"Oasis"	Elliott Sellers
2016	"Won't Stop Running"	Lee Cherry
2016	"Where Does the Time Go"	Nathan Crooker
2019	"Fall on Me"	Se Oh

== Awards and nominations ==
Year	Association	Category	Nominated work	Result
2014	1st iHeartRadio Music Awards	Best Lyrics	"Say Something" (with Christina Aguilera)	Nominated
2014	NewNowNext Awards	Best New Music Group		Won
2015	Grammy Awards	Best Pop Duo/Group Performance	"Say Something" (with Christina Aguilera)	Won

== See also ==
- List of Epic Records artists
