= Wonder Age =

Studio album by Air Dubai
- Released: October 5, 2010
- Recorded: Blasting Room Studios; Fort Collins, CO
- Genre: Alternative
- Length: 41:59
- Producer: Air Dubai; Andrew Guerrero of Flobots

Air Dubai chronology
| The Early October (2008) | Wonder Age (2010) | Day Escape (2011) |

Wonder Age is the debut album by alternative rock band Air Dubai, released on October 5, 2010, with production by Andrew Guerrero.

== Background ==
On September 29, 2010, Air Dubai did an interview with Westword Magazine announcing that their initial idea to release an EP had been scrapped and they planned to release a full-length album instead. This news came as a hard decision to the band as they had been performing as a full 7-member group for a full year and had yet to release any material.

After spending a month writing, recording for Wonder Age began in July 2010, when within a full week they finished tracking and mixing the 11-song album in Fort Collins, Colorado at The Blasting Room.

== Singles ==
The band released "Restless Youth" as the album's lead single in conjunction with Channel 93.3's Hometown For The Holiday's Competition in December 2010. The single was voted as the top song for the year and won the band first place in the station's competition.

The second single "Ten Weeks", in addition to "Restless Youth" and album track "Lasers" were also very well received and landed the band syndication on episodes of MTV programs Jersey Shore, I Used To Be Fat and Friendzone as well as placement in ESPN's 2012 College Football season broadcast

== Track listing ==
| No. | Title | Writer(s) | Length |
|---|---|---|---|
| 1. | "Restless Youth" | Air Dubai | 3:36 |
| 2. | "I Know How" | Air Dubai, Jahmai Steward | 2:59 |
| 3. | "Weekends" | Air Dubai | 3:22 |
| 4. | "Warm Days" | Air Dubai | 3:51 |
| 5. | "Love In Retrograde" | Air Dubai | 4:08 |
| 6. | "Anything At All" | Air Dubai | 3:22 |
| 7. | "City Of Lights" | Air Dubai | 3:22 |
| 8. | "Ten Weeks" | Air Dubai, Bos | 3:49 |
| 9. | "Lasers" | Air Dubai, Edward Ma | 4:16 |
| 10. | "Black & White" | Air Dubai | 4:05 |
| 11. | "Modern Gold" | Air Dubai | 4:37 |
