= Be Calm =

Studio album by Air Dubai
- Released: July 1, 2014
- Studio: Matchbox Studios; Austin, TX; Boulevard Recording; Los Angeles, CA
- Genre: Hip hop, pop
- Length: 49:03
- Label: Hopeless Records
- Producer: Dwight A. Baker; Colin Munroe

Air Dubai chronology
| Day Escape (2011) | Be Calm (2014) |

Be Calm is the second album by hip-hop band Air Dubai, released on July 1, 2014 through Hopeless Records.

== Background ==
The recording process for Be Calm began in late 2011 when the band was introduced to producer Dwight A. Baker (of The Wind and The Wave (band)). Baker operates Matchbox Studios in rural Austin, TX. Over the course of a year, the band made multiple trips to Austin to complete what was intended to be a ten-track album, set to be independently released in November 2012.

After the band was signed to Hopeless Records in fall of 2012, the album was postponed indefinitely. The label released the Warning EP on May 21, 2013, featuring five new songs from the Matchbox sessions.

In September 2013, Air Dubai was introduced to producer/songwriter Colin Munroe, most known for his work with Kendrick Lamar and Drake. Munroe would go on to produce three more songs for the band the following January at Boulevard Recording in Los Angeles, CA.

The songs "Afterglow (feat. Dia Frampton)" and "Coasts" (both produced by Munroe) were released in June 2014, ahead of the album release date.

The album was released on July 1, 2014.

== Singles ==
The band released "Warning (feat. Patricia Lynn)" as the album's lead single. The song originally appeared on their Warning EP in 2013, which served as a teaser for the album displaying five songs from Be Calm ahead of its release. The song received decent radio-play throughout the United States, landing regular rotation on KTCL Denver, KROQ Los Angeles, KIISFM, Z100 as well as Sirius XM Radio Station 20 on 20. The song was placed on several MTV and VH1 series, with the official video premiering on Just Jared.

== Track listing ==
| No. | Title | Writer(s) | Length |
|---|---|---|---|
| 1. | "All Day" | Air Dubai, Adam McInnis | 3:57 |
| 2. | "Afterglow (feat. Dia Frampton)" | Air Dubai, Colin Munroe, Dia Frampton | 3:47 |
| 3. | "Coasts" | Air Dubai | 4:21 |
| 4. | "D.L.G." | Air Dubai | 3:31 |
| 5. | "Hit The Dark" | Air Dubai | 3:31 |
| 6. | "Gone" | Air Dubai | 3:12 |
| 7. | "Warning (feat. Patricia Lynn)" | Air Dubai, Patricia Lynn | 3:24 |
| 8. | "Let Down" | Air Dubai, Adam McInnis | 3:32 |
| 9. | "Soul & Body" | Air Dubai | 3:53 |
| 10. | "Dance With The Devil" | Air Dubai, Adam McInnis | 3:54 |
| 11. | "Nighttime" | Air Dubai | 3:28 |
| 12. | "Lost Tonight" | Air Dubai, Tom Peyton, Colin Munroe | 3:47 |
| 13. | "Sunrise" | Air Dubai | 4:54 |
