= When the Morning Comes (A Great Big World album) =

Studio album by A Great Big World
- Released: November 13, 2015
- Recorded: 2014–15
- Studio: Sarm Studios, London
- Genre: Pop; pop rock
- Label: Black Magnetic; Epic

A Great Big World chronology
Is There Anybody Out There? (2014)	When the Morning Comes (2015)	Particles (2021)

Singles from When the Morning Comes
- 1. "Hold Each Other" Released: July 22, 2015; 2. "Oasis" Released: February 22, 2016; 3. "Won't Stop Running" Released: May 10, 2016

When the Morning Comes is the second studio album by A Great Big World and follows their debut album Is There Anybody Out There? and was released on Epic Records a division of Sony Music Entertainment on November 13, 2015.

Several musicians and producers collaborated on the album including Dave Eggar, Derek Fuhrmann, Gregg Wattenberg, Greg Holden, Kevin Kadish, Josh Kear, Dan Romer and Mozella.

== Singles ==
The lead single "Hold Each Other" was released on July 22, 2015, featuring rapper Futuristic. The non-rap version was released on July 24, 2015.

The second single "Oasis" was released on February 22, 2016.

The third single "Won't Stop Running" was released on May 10, 2016.

== Track listing ==
1. "All I Want Is Love" (3:11)
2. "Kaleidoscope" (3:49)
3. "End of the World" (3:33)
4. "Hold Each Other" (featuring Futuristic) (3:37)
5. "Oasis" (3:23)
6. "Come On" (3:27)
7. "Won't Stop Running" (3:46)
8. "One Step Ahead" (4:12)
9. "The Future's Right in Front of Me" (3:27)
10. "When the Morning Comes" (3:45)
11. "Where Does the Time Go" (3:48)
12. "Hold Each Other" (3:14)

== Charts ==
Chart (2015)	Peak position
US Billboard 200	75
