= The Rise (Futuristic album) =

Studio album by Futuristic
- Released: May 12, 2015
- Recorded: 2014–15
- Length: 40:50
- Producer: Futuristic (exec.); De-Capo Music Group; Go The Brave; Kato; Roc N Mayne; Samson; Tony Choc; Twigg; Tyler Rohn

Futuristic chronology
| Traveling Local (2014) | The Rise (2015) | Coast 2 Coast (2015) |

Singles from The Rise
- 1. "No Way" Released: September 20, 2014; 2. "The Greatest" Released: March 14, 2015

The Rise is the fourth studio album by American rapper Futuristic. It was released independently on May 12, 2015. The album features guest appearances from D-Pryde, Samson, Casto and Devvon Terrell. The album was supported by two singles: "No Way" and "The Greatest".

== Background ==
The album was announced on March 1, 2015 on Futuristic's website.

== Promotion ==
=== Singles ===
The album's lead single, titled "No Way" was released on September 20, 2014. The music video was released two days later and was directed by Jakob Owens. Since its release, the music video has received over 14 million views. The song was produced by Twigg.

The album's second single, titled "The Greatest" was released on March 14, 2015. The music video was released four days later and was directed by Jakob Owens and shows Futuristic dressed as a nerd rapping for people in McClintock High School. The song and music video gained recognition after it was cross-promoted by another video uploaded by BigDawsTv on the same day tilted "Nerd Raps Fast in Compton!". Since its release, both the video and the music video has received over 28 million views. The song was produced by De-Capo Music Group.

=== Other songs ===
The album was promoted through various music videos with, "Too Easy", being released on May 13, 2015. The video shows Futuristic dressed as a nerd again rapping for people in ASU. The song and music video was cross-promoted again by an upload by BigDawsTv on the same day tilted "Nerd Raps Fast at Collage!".

The music video for "OD" featuring D-Pryde was released on May 17, followed up by "Let's Do Something" on May 31. "Raw" featuring Samson was released on June 14, followed up by "Man on a Mission" on August 2. "Music Saved my Life" was released on September 27, and "Call of Duty" featuring Castro was released on November 5. All music videos were directed by Jakob Owens.

== Commercial performance ==
The Rise debuted at number 139 on the Billboard 200 for the chart dated May 30, 2015. The album also debuted on the Top R&B/Hip-Hop Albums and Rap Albums at number 13 and 10 respectively.

== Track listing ==
Songwriting credits are adapted from the American Society of Composers, Authors and Publishers (ASCAP).

| No. | Title | Writer(s) | Producer(s) | Length |
|---|---|---|---|---|
| 1. | "The Greatest" | Zachary Beck; Darius Bryant; Noah Nwachukwu | De-Capo Music Group | 3:34 |
| 2. | "No Way" | Beck | Twigg | 3:51 |
| 3. | "Man on a Mission" | Beck | Twigg | 4:01 |
| 4. | "OD" (featuring D-Pryde) | Beck; Bryant; Nwachukwu | De-Capo Music Group | 3:54 |
| 5. | "Not Enough" | Beck; Phillip Guillory; Tyler Rohn | Tyler Rohn | 2:26 |
| 6. | "Whatever I Want" | Beck; Bryant; Nwachukwu | De-Capo Music Group | 3:22 |
| 7. | "Let's Do Somethin" | Beck | Twigg | 2:32 |
| 8. | "Catch You" | Beck | Go The Brave | 3:29 |
| 9. | "Raw" (featuring Samson) | Beck | Samson | 2:40 |
| 10. | "Too Easy" | Beck; Chris Ju | Roc N Mayne; Kato | 2:47 |
| 11. | "Call of Duty" (featuring Castro) | Beck; Bryant; Nwachukwu | De-Capo Music Group | 3:03 |
| 12. | "The Rise" (featuring Devvon Terrell) | Beck; Bryant; Devvon McLeod; Nwachukwu | De-Capo Music Group | 3:55 |
| 13. | "Music Saved My Life" | Beck; Tony Vu | Tony Choc; Futuristic | 3:57 |
| Total length: | | | | 40:50 |

== Charts ==
| Chart (2015) | Peak position |
|---|---|
| US Billboard 200 | 139 |
| US Heatseekers Albums (Billboard) | 3 |
| US Top R&B/Hip-Hop Albums (Billboard) | 13 |
