= As Seen on the Internet =

Studio album by Futuristic
- Released: August 26, 2016
- Recorded: 2016
- Genre: Hip hop
- Length: 42:32
- Label: We're The Future Records
- Producers: Futuristic (exec.); Tyler Rohn (also exec.); Cook Classics; Joey Castellani; Kato; King!; Lou Koo; RU AreYou; Stitch Jones; Wave Cutters

Futuristic chronology
Coast 2 Coast (2015)	As Seen on the Internet (2016)	What More Could You Ask for? (2017)

As Seen on the Internet is the fifth studio album by American rapper Futuristic. It was released on August 26, 2016 through We're The Future Records. The album features guest appearances from Hopsin, Devvon Terrell, Karmin and Goody Grace.

== Background and promotion ==
In an interview with Sway Calloway, about the album, Futuristic said that:

"As Seen on the Internet" is a project that I been wanting to do forever and it's basically it came from like, I popped off from doing that nerd rap and what I did was I collab with a big YouTuber and I dropped my video on the same day and we cross promoted them. So we did that and I just got hella fans from it so I was like "If I could do that one time, what would happen if I did a whole album and every song was like that where I grabbed the biggest people from the internet that they're not even in music necessarily just big people from the internet and incorporated them into the album?".

After the release of the album, Futuristic released eleven music videos all directed by Jakob Owens to promote the album.

== Commercial performance ==
The album debuted at number 116 on the Billboard 200 for the chart dated September 17, 2016. It also debuted on the Top R&B/Hip-Hop Albums and Rap Albums charts at number ten and eight respectively and debuted at number 200 in the Belgian Albums chart.

== Track listing ==
Credits are adapted from the American Society of Composers, Authors and Publishers (ASCAP) and YouTube.

No.	Title	Writer(s)	Producer(s)	Length
1.	"Mindcraft"	Zachary Beck; Christopher Ju; Tyler Rohn	Kato; Tyler Rohn	2:36
2.	"The Time Is Now"	Beck; Rudy Reynon III	Ru AreYou	2:46
3.	"Do It"	Beck; Bean Lobban	Cook Classics	3:17
4.	"Anti-Social"	Beck; Sherwin Rice III	King!	3:32
5.	"Scrollin" (featuring Hopsin)	Beck; Marcus Hopson; Rohn	Wave Cutters; Rohn	3:58
6.	"Biggest Fan"	Beck; Rice III	King!	1:10
7.	"Nudes" (featuring Devvon Terrell)	Beck; Joseph Castellani; Devvon McLeod	Joey Castellani	3:15
8.	"No Service"	Beck; Reynon; Rohn	Ru AreYou; Rohn	4:04
9.	"Alone in the City"	Beck; Louis Bartolini	Lou Koo	3:45
10.	"Flex" (featuring Karmin)	Beck; Qveen Herby; Lobban	Cook Classics	3:05
11.	"Next Level"	Beck; Rohn	Stitch Jones; Rohn	2:06
12.	"See Me Mad"	Beck; Rohn	Rohn	3:06
13.	"Can't Go Back" (featuring Goody Grace)	Beck; Lobban	Cook Classics	3:52
14.	"Hashtag"	Beck; Reynon	Ru AreYou	2:00
Total length:				42:32

Notes

- "The Time Is Now" features vocals by Shia LaBeouf.
- "Do It" features vocals by Lexy Panterra
- "No Service" features vocals by Patrick Warburton, Seth MacFarlane, Jason Statham, Morgan Freeman and Peter Cullen.

== Charts ==
Chart (2016)	Peak position
Belgian Albums (Ultratop Flanders)	200
New Zealand Heatseekers Albums (RMNZ)	10
US Billboard 200	116
US Top R&B/Hip-Hop Albums (Billboard)	10
