= I Used to Be Fat =

- Genre: Reality
- Country of origin: United States
- Original language: English
- No. of seasons: 2
- No. of episodes: 28

Production
- Executive producers: Amy Bailey; Adam Kaloustian; Todd A. Nelson; J. D. Roth; Dave Sirulnick
- Running time: 60 minutes
- Production company: 3Ball Productions

Original release
- Network: MTV
- Release: December 29, 2010 – July 25, 2013

I Used to Be Fat is an MTV reality series about overweight teens striving to achieve weight loss through means of diet and exercise. Each episode follows one teenager who is paired with a motivational personal trainer. The trainer teaches them new exercise and eating habits over a few months while offering emotional support. Documented students share their personal trials and tribulations in the series.

Several episodes of the show have covered a high school student's last summer before college. These students expressed a desire for a metamorphosis before they start their new lives away from home.

== Episodes ==
=== Series overview ===
Season	Episodes	Originally released	
Season	Episodes	First released	Last released
1	20	December 29, 2010	December 21, 2011
2	8	July 15, 2013	July 25, 2013

=== Season 1 (2010–11) ===
No. overall	No. in season	Title	Original release date	US viewers (millions)
1	1	"Gabriella"	December 29, 2010	N/A
Gabriella first realized she was overweight when some boys started teasing her in the first grade, and it's only gotten worse. She thinks about food constantly, feels she has no self-control over her eating, and despite pressure from her mom to lose pounds, she's been unable to stick to any diet. Gabriella's weight has become a real power struggle between her and her mom, and she knows she needs someone to help her break the cycle. She says she has never felt normal or skinny and wonders sometimes if she'll ever know what it means to feel that way.
2	2	"Marci"	January 5, 2011	N/A
As she attempts to move into college after years of home schooling, 250 lb Marci discovers that the comfort of her sheltered life is no longer satisfying enough. Marci wants to create a new life where she has friends and wears cute clothes - but first she has to battle her biggest enemy - herself. Will her boot-camp style trainer, Justin, be too extreme to battle years of junk food and insecurity? Or will Marci be able to conquer her weight and finally become the woman she wants to be?
3	3	"Dominick"	January 12, 2011	N/A
As he graduates high school, 306lb Dominick realizes he needs to lose weight - but it proves difficult since his Italian mother expresses love with food. As the weight comes off, Dominick dreams of leaving home to go to culinary school .but his mother wants him go to a local community college instead. With the help of a personal trainer, Saran, we follow his journey into manhood. Will he be able to lose the weight, stand up to his mom, and start living the life he wants to live?
4	4	"Makenzie"	January 19, 2011	N/A
As she graduates from high school, 273 lb Makenzie looks forward to going to cosmetology school in the fall and starting to date. Makenzie has never really felt good about the way she looks, and the pressure from her dad to lose weight doesn't help. With the help of a personal trainer, Mike, will Makenzie be able to realize that she needs to concentrate on feeling better about herself? Or will she keep thinking that she has to get a guy to win her dad's love?
5	5	"Jordan"	January 26, 2011	N/A
272 lb Jordan began life as an average sized kid, but when his family problems left him to raise himself, he started overeating for comfort. With Jordan's eating habits out of control, can he face his family issues and seize the opportunity for a new beginning? Or will he be unable to overcome his past and lose the weight?
6	6	"Daria"	February 2, 2011	N/A
After moving to a new city, Daria turned to food to deal with her isolation at school. While her trainer, Tammie, steps in to help her lose 60 lbs her mother does not think Daria has a weight problem & she isn't supportive. Will Daria's mother hold her back from starting a new chapter in her life? Or will Tammie break through and unlock Daria's potential?
7	7	"Kirsten"	February 9, 2011	N/A
263 lb. Kirsten is a product of her environment and, after being cut from her high school basketball team, she struggles to believe in herself. With the help of a personal trainer, Jimi, will she be able to transform herself before moving away to college? Or will her self-doubt and bad eating habits continue to hold her back?
8	8	"Tanner"	February 16, 2011	N/A
For former wrestler Tanner, life is all about his thin girlfriend Mikyla. When he begins to turn his life around with the help of Trainer Eric, his only motivation is to marry his high school sweetheart. But when their relationship takes a turn for the worse can he find the motivation to get healthy for himself, or will his willpower go with Mikyla?
9	9	"Kelly"	February 23, 2011	N/A
Kelly turned to food after the tragic loss of her father. Can she shed weight and her shy personality before her departure to college?
10	10	"Past to Present"	March 2, 2011	N/A
11	11	"Josh"	October 11, 2011	N/A
At 310 pounds, Josh is by far the largest person in his athletic family. He's forced to stand on the sidelines as his younger brothers play team sports and go on dates. Can trainer Joey help Josh finally give up the sweets he loves and become the man he dreams of being?
12	12	"Terra"	October 18, 2011	N/A
Terra's whole family loves to eat - one of their favorite pastimes is to climb into her mom's bed and eat ice cream while watching TV. But Terra's weight is making her feel isolated and unhappy. Can she find the strength to change, even if her family doesn't support her?
13	13	"Lindsey"	October 25, 2011	N/A
Lindsey's divorced parents both have issues with food; her mom has had her stomach stapled, and her dad refuses to change his eating habits, despite his diabetes and past kidney failure. On top of that, her relationship with him is difficult and tumultuous. Can she make peace with him and learn to move on for the sake of her own health?
14	14	"Latrice"	November 1, 2011	N/A
Latrice seems outgoing and funny, but on the inside, she feels abandoned by her mother, who lives in another state. Her defensive attitude and secret binge eating threaten her success as she tries to change. Will her trainer finally be able to break through her defenses?
15	15	"Sammy"	November 8, 2011	N/A
Sammy is the baby in his family, and his overprotective mom does everything for him. He wants a fresh start, but first he needs to start making his own decisions. Will Saran help transform Sammy into the man he wants to be?
16	16	"Maddy"	November 15, 2011	N/A
Maddy has experienced more in her 18 years than some do in a lifetime, and she turned to alcohol to cope. Now she's proudly sober, but fears she's become addicted to food instead. Can Maddy learn to face her addiction issues and move forward with a healthy lifestyle?
17	17	"Holly"	November 22, 2011	N/A
Holly's family loves to eat fried and fatty foods. Although her nickname is "Happy Holly" she secretly struggles with the emotions bottled up inside. Will she be able to finally break away from her family's bad habits and learn to express her real feelings?
18	18	"Janelle"	November 22, 2011	N/A
Everyone in Janelle's traditional Mexican family is overweight; frequent family gatherings revolve solely around food. Can Janelle find a balance between family obligations and taking care of herself?
19	19	"Jose"	December 14, 2011	N/A
Jose yearns to lose weight to play college football and hopes trainer Joey can help.
20	20	"Paul"	December 21, 2011	N/A
Paul longs to become a police officer, but his weight is holding him back.

=== Season 2 (2013) ===
No. overall	No. in season	Title	Original release date	US viewers (millions)
21	1	"Deanna"	July 15, 2013	N/A
Deanna struggles with her father going to jail and her constant weight gain. Can she transform over summer and leave her insecurities behind?
22	2	"Kevin"	July 16, 2013	N/A
Kevin has one summer to transform his body and finally become the athlete his has always dreamt of being.
23	3	"Maya"	July 17, 2013	N/A
Maya's ready to follow her dreams of becoming a personal stylist with a new attitude, and a new body, but will she be able to make her weight goal by the end of the summer?
24	4	"Kellie"	July 18, 2013	N/A
Kellie is an 18-year-old girl who has big dreams of being an artist, but can't get past the emotional and physical barriers of her weight. Trainer Saran steps in to help her lose a whopping 65 pounds before she heads off to college.
25	5	"Jorine"	July 22, 2013	N/A
Jorine grew up with no parents and always felt like she had a tough life. Can she change her attitude and finally feel proud of her body?
26	6	"Trevor"	July 23, 2013	N/A
With the lifetime goal to play college baseball, Trevor will attempt to push his limits and knock his weight out of the park.
27	7	"Rebecca"	July 24, 2013	N/A
Rebecca is used to getting what she wants, how she wants it. Can she find the motivation to listen to her trainer and make it to her weight goal?
28	8	"Olivia"	July 25, 2013	N/A
Olivia's disease caused her to become overweight but she's determined to overcome her challenges and be the woman she has always wanted to be.
