= Devvon Terrell =

American rapper (born 1988)

- Born: Devvon Terrell McLeod; October 6, 1988 (age 37); Brooklyn, New York City
- Genres: R&B; hip hop; lo-fi; soul
- Occupations: Singer; rapper; songwriter; record producer
- Instrument: Vocals
- Years active: 2010–present
- Labels: Devvon Terrell, LLC
- Website: devvonterrell.com

Devvon Terrell McLeod (born October 6, 1988), is an American singer, rapper, songwriter and record producer. He is known for his remixes to popular songs online on YouTube. As of October 2020, his channel has received over 800,000 subscribers and over 170 million video views.

== Early life ==
Devvon Terrell McLeod was born in Brooklyn, New York City on October 6, 1988. From his early youth, Terrell aspired to become a musician. He told Forbes, "Like any other musician, I’ve been doing this my entire life. I was in college, getting my degree in computer information systems, and I realized that I really didn’t want to sit behind a computer for the rest of my life. When I graduated, I decided to go to Full Sail University for my audio degree. That was like musical boot camp. It really solidified the fact that music is what I wanted to do for the rest of my life."

== Career ==
=== 2010–2014: Career beginnings ===
In 2010, Terrell released two mixtapes with rapper Young X titled, April Fools and Download or Die. In July 2012, Terrell released his first music video to his song, "My Senses". He then went on and release his debut extended play, The Living Weirdo_o, in September 2014. The album was supported by the singles: "I Like It" and "#WCW".

=== 2015–2018: Weird Sexy Cool, Coast 2 Coast, The Renaissance and Weird Nights ===
On August 18, 2015, Terrell released his debut studio album titled, Weird Sexy Cool, which included the single, "Tell You Off" featuring Witt Lowry.

On December 13, 2015, Terrell released a remix to the song, "Blasé", with rapper Futuristic. They later announced that they would be releasing a collaborative album titled, "Coast 2 Coast", and leading up to the release of the album they would release various remixes to popular songs and dubbed them as "12 Days of Christmas". The album was released on December 25, 2015, and debuted at number 82 on the US Billboard 200 chart and at number 12 and ten on the Top R&B/Hip-Hop Albums and Top Rap Albums charts respectively.

On September 2, 2016, Terrell released his second extended play titled, The Renaissance, which included the single, "Why So Serious". The EP went on and charted at number 27 on the Top R&B/Hip-Hop Albums chart and at number 11 on the Top R&B Albums charts.

In April 2017, Terrell released his third extended play titled, The Mixes. On October 6, 2017, Terrell released his second studio album, Weird Nights. The album was supported by the single "Temperature". He later went on and release Weird Nights – The Intermission, a follow-up to the album on November 16, 2018.

=== 2019–present: The Rawe Sound, Vol 1 and Vol. 2: Deja Vu ===
Following the release of Weird Nights – The Intermission, Terrell uploaded a video to his channel saying that he would "stop making music". On March 24, 2019, Terrell return to making music with him later rebranding himself while also making lo-fi music. The song "Take Me Serious" was later released five days later. He later went on and release various singles from his album titled, The Rawe Sound, Vol 1. The album was released on July 26, 2019. A follow-up titled, The Rawe Sound, Vol. 1: Side B was released in September 2019.

In May 2020, Terrell released his sixth extended play titled, Social Distancing Together. On October 2, 2020, Terrell released his fourth studio album titled, Vol. 2: Deja Vu. The album was supported by two singles: "Homewrecker" and "You Trippin".

== Discography ==
Studio albums

- Weird Sexy Cool (2015)
- Weird Nights (2017)
- The Rawe Sound, Vol 1 (2019)
- Social Distancing Together (2020)
- Vol. 2: Deja Vu (2020)
- Boys Don't Cry (2022)

Collaborative albums

- Coast 2 Coast (with Futuristic) (2015)

== Awards and nominations ==
| Year | Award Show | Category | Nominated work | Result | Ref. |
|---|---|---|---|---|---|
| 2017 | Streamy Awards | Influencer Campaign | DiGiorno (with Redfoo, Diamond White, Madilyn Bailey, Marcus Perez and O-Fresh) | Nominated | |
