= Hopsin discography =

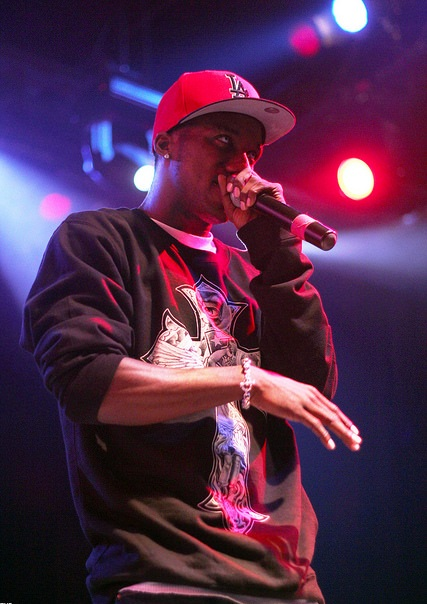
- Hopsin performing in May 2013
- Studio albums: 5
- Singles: 51
- Music videos: 57
- Mixtapes: 2

American rapper Hopsin has released five studio albums, two mixtapes, 51 singles (including eleven as a featured artist) and 57 music videos. After signing with Ruthless Records in 2007, Hopsin released his debut studio album entitled, Gazing at the Moonlight, in October 2009. The album was a commercial failure, selling only 42 copies in its first week. Shortly before his departure from Ruthless, Hopsin formed a new label, Funk Volume, with Damien Ritter and released a mixtape with SwizZz entitled, Haywire, and his second studio album, Raw, in 2009 and 2010, respectively. The album spawned the singles: "Nocturnal Rainbows" and "Sag My Pants", with the latter single being certified gold by RIAA.

Hopsin later became popular on YouTube with his "Ill Mind" series which later helped him increase his popularity online. "Ill Mind of Hopsin 4" and "5" was released which the latter single being certified gold by RIAA. Hopsin released his third studio album, Knock Madness, in 2013, to generally positive reviews. The album entered at number 132 on the US Billboard 200 and later rose to number 76 the following week. The album spawned the singles: "Ill Mind Six: Old Friend", "Hop Is Back", and "Rip Your Heart Out". His fourth studio album, Pound Syndrome, was released in July 2015, and entered the Billboard 200 at number 17. The album spawned the singles: "Ill Mind of Hopsin 7", "Crown Me", "Fly" and "Fort Collins".

Hopsin released, "Ill Mind of Hopsin 8", in March 2016, which saw Hopsin leave his label, Funk Volume, after ongoing business issues and financial disputes with co-founder, Damien Ritter. After his departure from the label, Hopsin created a new label, Undercover Prodigy, and released numerous singles with the label. His fifth studio album, No Shame, was released in November 2017, with 300 Entertainment and entered the Billboard 200 at number 42. The album spawned the singles: "The Purge", "Happy Ending", "Witch Doctor" and "Ill Mind of Hopsin 9".

== Albums ==
=== Studio albums ===
List of studio albums, with selected chart positions
Title	Album details	Peak chart positions						
Title	Album details	US	US Heat	US R&B/HH	US Rap	AUS	CAN	NZ
Gazing at the Moonlight	Released: October 27, 2009; Label: Ruthless; Formats: CD, digital download	—	—	—	—	—	—	—
Raw	Released: November 19, 2010; Label: Undercover Prodigy; Originally released under Funk Volume; Formats: CD, digital download, cassette tape	—	46	—	—	—	—	—
Knock Madness	Released: November 26, 2013; Label: Funk Volume, Empire; Formats: CD, digital download	76	1	13	7	—	—	—
Pound Syndrome	Released: July 24, 2015; Label: Undercover Prodigy as of 2025; Originally released under Funk Volume, Warner Bros.; Formats: CD, digital download	17	—	6	4	15	12	24
No Shame	Released: November 24, 2017; Label: Undercover Prodigy, 300; Formats: CD, digital download	42	—	19	14	37	60	—

== Mixtapes ==
List of mixtapes, with year release
Title	Mixtape details
Emurge	Recorded: 2003 • 2008
Haywire (with SwizZz)	Released: June 18, 2009; Label: Funk Volume; Format: Digital download

== Singles ==
=== As lead artist ===
List of singles, with selected chart positions and certifications, showing year released and album name
Title	Year	Peak chart positions						Certifications	Album
Title	Year	US Bub.	US R&B/HH	US R&B/HH Digital	US Rap Digital	AUS	NZ Hot	Certifications	Album
"Pans in the Kitchen"	2008	—	—	—	—	—	—		Gazing at the Moonlight
"I'm Here"	2009	—	—	—	—	—	—		Gazing at the Moonlight
"Lucifer Effect" (with SwizZz)	2009	—	—	—	—	—	—		Haywire
"Bad Motherfucker" (with SwizZz)	2009	—	—	—	—	—	—		Haywire
"Leave Me Alone"	2009	—	—	—	—	—	—		Haywire
"Nocturnal Rainbows"	2010	—	—	—	—	—	—		Raw
"Sag My Pants"	2010	—	—	—	—	—	—	RIAA: Gold	Raw
"Ill Mind of Hopsin 4"	2011	—	—	—	—	—	—		Non-album singles
"Hop Madness"	2012	—	—	—	—	—	—		Non-album singles
"Ill Mind of Hopsin 5"	2012	—	—	17	20	—	—	RIAA: Platinum	Non-album singles
"Funk Volume 2013" (with SwizZz, Jarren Benton, Dizzy Wright and DJ Hoppa)	2013	—	—	—	—	—	—		Non-album singles
"Ill Mind Six: Old Friend"	2013	—	—	—	—	—	—		Knock Madness
"Hop Is Back"	2013	—	—	—	41	—	—		Knock Madness
"Rip Your Heart Out" (featuring Tech N9ne)	2013	—	—	—	—	—	—		Knock Madness
"Ill Mind of Hopsin 7"	2014	—	—	46	27	— (Note: "Ill Mind of Hopsin 7" did not enter the ARIA Australian Top 100 Singles, but peaked at number 17 on the Australian Top 40 Urban Singles chart.)	—		Pound Syndrome
"Crown Me"	2015	—	— (Note: "Crown Me" did not enter the Billboard Hot R&B/Hip-Hop Songs chart, but peaked at number three on the Bubbling Under R&B/Hip-Hop Singles chart.)	36	25	—	—		Pound Syndrome
"Fly"	2015	—	—	46	35	—	—		Pound Syndrome
"Free Meal" (with Dizzy Wright and Jarren Benton)	2015	—	—	—	—	—	—		Non-album single
"Fort Collins" (featuring Dizzy Wright)	2015	—	—	—	—	—	—		Pound Syndrome
"Ill Mind of Hopsin 8"	2016	21	43	24	16	—	—	RIAA: Gold	Non-album singles
"Bout the Business"	2016	—	—	—	47	—	—		Non-album singles
"Die This Way" (featuring Matt Black and Joey Tee)	2016	—	—	—	—	—	—		Non-album singles
"False Advertisement"	2016	—	—	—	—	—	—		Non-album singles
"All Your Fault"	2017	—	—	—	—	—	—		Non-album singles
"Bus That"	2017	—	—	—	—	—	—		Non-album singles
"The Purge"	2017	—	—	—	—	—	—		No Shame
"Happy Ending"	2017	—	—	—	—	—	—		No Shame
"Witch Doctor"	2017	—	—	—	—	—	—		No Shame
"Ill Mind of Hopsin 9"	2017	—	—	—	—	—	—		No Shame
"YourWorthIt.org" (with Dax)	2018	—	—	—	—	—	—		Non-album singles
"Low-Key"	2018	—	—	—	—	—	—		Non-album singles
"Hell's Carol"	2018	—	—	—	—	—	—		Non-album singles
"You Should've Known" (featuring Dax)	2019	—	—	—	—	—	—		Non-album singles
"The Old Us"	2019	—	—	—	—	—	—		Non-album singles
"Picasso"	2019	—	—	—	—	—	27		Non-album singles
"I Don’t Want It"	2019	—	—	—	—	—	—		Non-album singles
"Covid Mansion"	2020	—	—	—	—	—	—		Non-album singles
"Kumbaya"	2020	—	—	—	—	—	—		Non-album singles
"Your House"	2021	—	—	—	—	—	—		Non-album singles
"Alone With Me"	2021	—	—	—	—	—	—		Non-album singles
"Be11a Ciao"	2021	—	—	—	—	—	—		Non-album singles
"Arrival"	2023	—	—	—	—	—	—		Minor Disturbance
"Rebirth"	2023	—	—	—	—	—	—		Minor Disturbance
"Single on Singel" (with Adriana Aslani)	2023	—	—	—	—	—	—		Minor Disturbance
"—" denotes items which were not released in that country or failed to chart.

=== As featured artist ===
List of singles as featured artist, with selected chart positions and certifications, showing year released and album name
Title	Year	Peak chart positions						Certifications	Album
Title	Year	US	US R&B/HH	CAN	IRE	NZ Hot	UK	Certifications	Album
"Am I a Psycho?" (Tech N9ne featuring Hopsin and B.o.B)	2012	—	—	—	—	—	—	RIAA: Platinum	All 6's and 7's
"Turnt Up" (Kung Fu Vampire featuring Hopsin)	2013	—	—	—	—	—	—		Re-Animated
"Underground Hits (Remix)" (R.A. the Rugged Man featuring Hopsin and Jarren Benton)	2013	—	—	—	—	—	—		Legends Never Die (Note: Only the original version appears on the album.)
"Cuz I'm Famous" (Travis Barker featuring Paul Wall, Hopsin, Yelawolf and Scoop Deville)	2013	—	—	—	—	—	—		non-album single
"Underestimated" (Snypa Da Prophet featuring Hopsin)	2014	—	—	—	—	—	—		Underground All Star Pt. 1
"I'm an Animal" (Shneal featuring Hopsin)	2015	—	—	—	—	—	—		non-album single
"Burn in Hell" (The Culprit featuring Hopsin)	2018	—	—	—	—	—	—		SoopaHeroVillain
"Don't Need You" (Jarren Benton featuring Hopsin)	2018	—	—	—	—	—	—		Yuck Fou
"Bass" (Merkules featuring Tech N9ne and Hopsin)	2019	—	—	—	—	—	—		Special Occasion
"Leather Face" (Bizarre featuring Hopsin, King Gordy and Lazarus)	2019	—	—	—	—	—	—		Rufus
"Who Shot Ya" (Grafh featuring Hopsin)	2020	—	—	—	—	—	—		Oracle III
"Lost" (NF featuring Hopsin)	2021	79	33	61	85	15	88	RIAA: Gold; MC: Gold	Clouds (The Mixtape)
"—" denotes a recording that did not chart or was not released in that territory.

== Guest appearances ==
List of non-single guest appearances, with other performing artists, showing year released and album name
Title	Year	Other artist(s)	Album
"Bang Bang Boogie"	2011	SwizZz	Good Morning SwizZzle
"On the Verge"	2011	Phillie Tha Kyd	The Right Dose
"Beastmode"	2011	Liquid Assassin	Cardell
"The End"	2012	Young Noble, Lowkey	Outlaw Rydahz Vol. 1
"West Coast Eclipse"	2012	DJ Whoo Kid	2012 XXL Freshman Class Mixtape
"Skreeem!"	2012	Insane Clown Posse, Tech N9ne	The Mighty Death Pop!
"Independent Living"	2012	Dizzy Wright, SwizZz	Free SmokeOut Conversations
"Funk Volume 2012"	2012	Dizzy Wright, SwizZz	Free SmokeOut Conversations
"Flickering"	2012	So Sick Social Club, Dead Celebrity Status	Dead Friend Don't Tell
"Raw Talk"	2012	Stevie Stone, SwizZz	Rollin' Stone
"Stabbed"	2013	Brotha Lynch Hung, Tech N9ne	Mannibalector
"Go Off"	2013	Jarren Benton, SwizZz	My Grandma's Basement
"Bout That Life"	2013	Dizzy Wright	The Golden Age
"Doctors In"	2013	Serial Killers (B-Real, Xzibit, Demrick)	Serial Killers Vol. 1
"Mr. Blackman"	2014	None	Dear White People: OST
"Killin My Soul"	2015	Jarren Benton, Jon Connor	Slow Motion
"Hoppa's Cypher"	2015	DJ Hoppa, Jarren Benton, Dizzy Wright, SwizZz	Hoppa and Friends
"Home Invasion"	2015	DJ Hoppa, SwizZz	Hoppa and Friends
"Psycho Bitch III"	2015	Tech N9ne	Special Effects
"Explain Myself"	2015	Dizzy Wright, Jarren Benton, SwizZz	The Growing Process
"High School Reunion"	2015	King Chip	CleveLAfornia
"Scrollin"	2016	Futuristic	As Seen on the Internet
"Matter Of Time"	2016	DJ B n E, Andrea, Concept, Fury	One Of 12
"Unfeigned"	2016	G-Mo Skee, Katz, Twiztid	My Filthy Spirit Bomb
"Rhyme Animal"	2016	D.CrazE the Destroyer, Dekay	The Reaper Project
"Feel Nothing"	2017	J Sutta	I Say Yes
"Everybody's a Bitch"	2017	King Los, Royce da 5'9"	Moors Bars
"Lights Out"	2018	Forever M.C., It's Different, Passionate MC, The Boy Illinois	Forever M.C.
"B*tch Slap"	2020	Tech N9ne, Corey Taylor, Great Daeg	MORE FEAR

== Music videos ==
List of music videos, showing year released and directors
Title	Year	Director(s)	Ref.
As lead artist
"Sexy Cyber"	2007	Hopsin	
"Pans in the Kitchen"	2009	Guerrilla Film Junkies	
"I'm Here"	2009	Unknown	
"Lucifer Effect" (with SwizZz)	2009	Hopsin and DJ K	
"Bad Motherfucker" (with SwizZz)	2009	Hopsin	
"Leave Me Alone"	2009	Hopsin	
"Motherfucker"	2010	Hopsin	
"Kill Her"	2010	Hopsin	
"Sag My Pants"	2010	Hopsin	
"You Are My Enemy"	2010	Hopsin and Nick Katz	
"How You Like Me Now" (featuring SwizZz)	2011	Hopsin	
"Ill Mind of Hopsin 4"	2011	Hopsin	
"Hop Madness"	2012	Hopsin	
"Ill Mind of Hopsin 5"	2012	Hopsin and Ryan Pinkall	
"Funk Volume 2013" (with SwizZz, Dizzy Wright, Jarren Benton and DJ Hoppa)	2013	Hopsin and George Orozco	
"Ill Mind of Hopsin 6"	2013	George Orozco and Hopsin (ass.)	
"Hop Is Back"	2013	Hopsin and George Orozco	
"I Need Help"	2014	Hopsin and George Orozco	
"Ill Mind of Hopsin 7"	2014	Hopsin	
"Crown Me"	2015	Hopsin	
"Fly"	2015	Hopsin and George Orozco	
"The Pound"	2015	Matt Alonzo	
"Fort Collins" (featuring Dizzy Wright)	2015	George Orozco	
"No Words"	2015	George Orozco	
"Ill Mind of Hopsin 8"	2016	George Orozco	
"Bout the Business"	2016	George Orozco	
"Die This Way"	2016	George Orozco	
"False Advertisement"	2016	George Orozco	
"All Your Fault"	2017	George Orozco	
"Bus That"	2017	Hopsin	
"The Purge"	2017	Hopsin	
"Happy Ending"	2017	Hopsin	
"Witch Doctor"	2017	Hopsin	
"Ill Mind of Hopsin 9"	2017	Hopsin	
"Panorama City" (featuring Joey Tee)	2018	Hopsin	
"Tell'em Who You Got It From"	2018	Justin Jones	
"Low-Key"	2018	Hopsin	
"Hell's Carol"	2018	Hopsin	
"You Should've Known" (featuring Dax)	2019	Hopsin	
"The Old Us"	2019	Hopsin	
"Picasso"	2019	Hopsin	
"Covid Mansion"	2020	Hopsin and George Orozco	
"Kumbaya"	2020	Hopsin and George Orozco	
"Your House"	2021	Hopsin and Moses Isreal	
"Alone With Me"	2021		
As featured artist
"Am I a Psycho?" (Tech N9ne featuring Hopsin and B.o.B.)	2012	Dan Gedman	
"Independent Living" (Dizzy Wright featuring SwizZz and Hopsin)	2012	Chris Le	
"Go Off" (Jarren Benton featuring SwizZz and Hopsin)	2013	Hopsin	
"Killin My Soul" (Jarren Benton featuring Hopsin and Locksmith)	2015	Armen Soudjian	
"Scrollin" (Futuristic featuring Hopsin)	2016	Jakob Owens	
"YourWorthIt.org" (Dax featuring Hopsin)	2018	Thad Swift	
"Don't Need You" (Jarren Benton featuring Hopsin)	2018	Jesse Ray Diamond	
"KASH" (The Future Kingz featuring Hopsin)	2020	Spaced Visuals	
"Lost" (NF featuring Hopsin)	2021	Patrick Tohill & Nathan Feuerstein	
Cameo appearances
"Can’t Trust Em" (Dizzy Wright)	2012	Aplus Filmz and On Point Films	
"Real Mind of Mysonne" (Mysonne)	2012	Mike D'Angelo	
"Wanted" (Serial Killers featuring Demrick, Xzibit and B-Real)	2013	Matt Alonzo	
"Open Letter" (Phora)	2016	George Orozco	
