= So Good (B.o.B song) =

Single by B.o.B

from the album Strange Clouds
- B-side: "Play the Guitar"
- Released: February 21, 2012
- Recorded: 2011
- Genre: Pop-rap
- Length: 3:30
- Label: Grand Hustle; Atlantic
- Songwriters: Bobby Ray Simmons, Jr.; Ryan Tedder; Brent Kutzle; Noel Zancanella
- Producers: Ryan Tedder, Noel Zancanella

B.o.B singles chronology
| "Am I a Psycho?" (2012) | "So Good" (2012) | "Both of Us" (2012) |

Music video
- "So Good" on YouTube

"So Good" is a song recorded by American rapper B.o.B, released on February 21, 2012, through Grand Hustle Records and Atlantic Records, via digital download as the second single from his second studio album, Strange Clouds (2012). The single was issued physically in Germany on May 4. It was written by B.o.B, Noel Zancanella, Brent Kutzle, and one of its producers Ryan Tedder, the frontman of the pop rock band OneRepublic, which also features with additional vocals. The song also appears in the 2013 film The Internship, starring Owen Wilson and Vince Vaughn, as well as the first episode of Netflix's romantic comedy television series Love.

== Critical reception ==
Digital Spy gave the following review of the song: "When he's not high as a kite, it seems B.o.B. has quite the interest in the arts. "She says that I'm her favourite, cause she admires the art - Of Michelangelo with the flow," he declares on his latest single 'So Good' - and the referencing of history's finest artists doesn't stop there. "Picasso with the bars, She's well put together like a piece by Gershwin," he adds about his latest love interest over an easy-going mix of chilled piano and head-nodding beats. While it's an ambitious claim to glide high with Renaissance figureheads, B.o.B's fun-loving attitude and care-free coolness does evoke a certain popular Michelangelo - if we're talking about the Teenage Mutant Ninja Turtles version, that is."

== Chart performance ==
The song debuted on the U.S. Billboard Hot 100, on the week of March 10, 2012, at number eleven, with 164,000 downloads on the week of release. The song also peaked at number 7 on the UK Singles Chart, making it B.o.B's fourth top-ten single. As of September 6, 2012, So Good has sold over 1 million copies in the United States and been certified double platinum in that territory. In 2013, the song was featured in the 2013 film The Internship.

== Music video ==
On February 14, B.o.B released a trailer for the music video, which featured previously unseen visuals, and announced a premiere date of March 21, 2012. On March 14, a second teaser for the music video was uploaded to B.o.B's official YouTube channel. The music video, directed by Justin Francis, was released on March 21, 2012.

== Track listing ==
- Digital download
1. "So Good" – 3:33
- Digital EP
1. "So Good" – 3:33
2. "Play the Guitar" (featuring André 3000) – 3:24
3. "Strange Clouds" (featuring Lil Wayne) – 3:46
- CD single
1. "So Good" – 3:33
2. "Play the Guitar" (featuring André 3000) – 3:24

== Charts ==
=== Weekly charts ===
Weekly chart performance for "So Good"
| Chart (2012) | Peak position |
|---|---|
| Australia (ARIA) | 9 |
| Austria (Ö3 Austria Top 40) | 38 |
| Belgium (Ultratip Bubbling Under Flanders) | 9 |
| Belgium (Ultratip Bubbling Under Wallonia) | 12 |
| Canada Hot 100 (Billboard) | 20 |
| France (SNEP) | 131 |
| Germany (GfK) | 65 |
| Ireland (IRMA) | 8 |
| Netherlands (Dutch Top 40) | 35 |
| Netherlands (Single Top 100) | 67 |
| New Zealand (Recorded Music NZ) | 15 |
| Scottish Singles Sales (Official Charts) | 7 |
| South Korea (Gaon) | 17 |
| Switzerland (Schweizer Hitparade) | 48 |
| UK Hip Hop/R&B (Official Charts) | 1 |
| UK Singles (Official Charts) | 7 |
| US Billboard Hot 100 | 11 |
| US Hot R&B/Hip-Hop Songs (Billboard) | 92 |
| US Hot Rap Songs (Billboard) | 20 |
| US Pop Airplay (Billboard) | 18 |
| US Rhythmic Airplay (Billboard) | 14 |

=== Year-end charts ===
Year-end chart performance for "So Good"
| Chart (2012) | Position |
|---|---|
| UK Singles (Official Charts Company) | 103 |
| US Billboard Hot 100 | 80 |

== Certifications ==
Certifications for "So Good"
| Region | Certification | Certified units/sales |
|---|---|---|
| Australia (ARIA) | Platinum | 70,000^{^} |
| Canada (Music Canada) | Gold | 40,000^{*} |
| New Zealand (RMNZ) | Platinum | 30,000^{‡} |
| United Kingdom (BPI) | Gold | 400,000^{‡} |
| United States (RIAA) | 2× Platinum | 2,000,000^{‡} |
^{*} Sales figures based on certification alone.^{^} Shipments figures based on certification alone.^{‡} Sales+streaming figures based on certification alone.

== Release history ==
Release history and formats for "So Good"
| Country | Date | Format | Label |
|---|---|---|---|
| United States | February 21, 2012 | Digital download | Atlantic Records |
| United Kingdom | April 16, 2012 | Digital download | Atlantic Records |
| Germany | May 4, 2012 | CD single | Atlantic Records |
