= Strange Clouds =

Strange Clouds may refer to:

- Strange Clouds (album), a 2012 album by B.o.B
  - "Strange Clouds" (song), the album's title song, released in 2011

== See also ==
- List of cloud types
