= All Your Fault =

All Your Fault may refer to:

- "All Your Fault" (Big Sean song), 2015
- "All Your Fault" (Hopsin song), 2017
- All Your Fault: Pt. 1, a 2017 extended play by Bebe Rexha
- All Your Fault: Pt. 2, a 2017 extended play by Bebe Rexha
- "All Your Fault", a 2021 song by Yugyeom and Gray
- "All Your Fault" (Adventure Time), a television episode
