= The One That Got Away (Katy Perry song) =

2011 single by Katy Perry

Single by Katy Perry

from the album Teenage Dream
- Released: September 30, 2011
- Studio: Conway Recording Studios, (Hollywood, California)
- Genre: Pop
- Length: 3:47
- Label: Capitol
- Songwriters: Katy Perry; Lukasz Gottwald; Max Martin
- Producers: Dr. Luke; Max Martin

Katy Perry singles chronology
| "Last Friday Night (T.G.I.F.)" (2011) | "The One That Got Away" (2011) | "Part of Me" (2012) |

B.o.B singles chronology
| "Strange Clouds" (2011) | "The One That Got Away" (2011) | "Play the Guitar" (2011) |

Music video
- "The One That Got Away" on YouTube

"The One That Got Away" is a song by American singer-songwriter Katy Perry from her third studio album, Teenage Dream (2010). She co-wrote the track with its producers Dr. Luke and Max Martin. The song was recorded in Conway Recording Studios, based in Hollywood, California, and is a mid-tempo pop ballad about a lost love.

Capitol Records released "The One That Got Away" on September 30, 2011, as the album's sixth and final single. Commercially, it charted within the top 10 in Austria, Canada, Hungary, Indonesia, Malaysia, and the United States, while reaching the top 20 in Iceland, Ireland, New Zealand, the Philippines, Scotland, Singapore, Turkey, and the United Kingdom. The track also received multi-Platinum certifications in Australia, Brazil, Canada, New Zealand, the United Kingdom, and the United States. On the Billboard Global 200, "The One That Got Away" peaked at number 23, becoming Perry's highest entry on the chart.

An accompanying music video for the song was directed by Floria Sigismondi and premiered in November 2011, featuring actor Diego Luna. An official remix featuring rapper B.o.B was released to digital retailers on December 20, 2011. An official acoustic rendition was released to digital retailers on January 16, 2012, and it would later be included in the Teenage Dream reissue, Teenage Dream: The Complete Confection, released on March 23, 2012. The song has been covered by various artists, including Kelly Clarkson, Chappell Roan, and Tate McRae.

== Release ==
On September 13, 2011, at the New York City's Irving Plaza, Capitol Records confirmed to Billboard that "The One That Got Away" would be the sixth single from Teenage Dream. Perry said from the label:

"I'm so pleased to select 'The One That Got Away' as my sixth single because this song shows a very different side of me that I haven't shown with my past singles on this record, I think that everyone can relate to this song. I wrote [it] about when you promise someone forever, but you end up not being able to follow through. It's a bittersweet story. Hopefully, the listener learns from hearing it and never has to say they had 'The One' get away."

Later that month, Perry wrote the following message on her Twitter account: "The One That Got Away... It's happening!!!", along with a picture of the official single artwork. The artwork shows a pink-haired Perry looking up at the sky while wearing a disc-shaped hat. The photo gives a whimsical nod to the 1970s, with its distinctively retro appearance. On September 30, the song received radio airplay release in France. Soon it was followed by the release of the song to American mainstream and rhythmic contemporary radio stations on October 11. The single was issued to Italian radios through EMI Music Publishing on October 28. On December 2, the remix EP of "The One That Got Away" was released. The remix featuring American rapper B.o.B was issued by Capitol Records to American pop and rhythmic radios on December 15, followed by a digital release of the song five days later. An acoustic rendition of the song was released on January 16, 2012.

Capitol Records said that they are not specifically releasing the song in hopes of it reaching number one and rewriting Hot 100 history (since Perry was the first woman to obtain five number ones on the chart from one album); rather the decision came out of "Perry's fondness for the song, its ear-catching hook and her obvious track record of success at pop radio". EMI Music/Capitol Records EVP/marketing and promotion Greg Thompson told Billboard that, "if it goes to No. 1, that would be great, If not, we still have a Katy song on the radio in fourth quarter", presumably boosting sales for Teenage Dream in the Christmas season.

== Composition ==
Originally titled "In Another Life", the song was produced by Dr. Luke and Max Martin, both of whom co-wrote it with Perry. It is a midtempo pop song positioned in the key of E major and has a tempo of 134 beats per minute. The song follows the chord progression of E–G♯m–C♯m–A, and Perry's vocal range spans from B_{3} to E_{5}. Joanna Holcombe from Yahoo! Music noted that the song is about first loves. Leah Greenblatt from Entertainment Weekly, said that the song is "a midtempo ode to a summer-after-high-school love with whom she recalls sharing Mustang makeout sessions to Radiohead'". Michael Wood from Spin magazine said that the song is one of the album's quieter cuts and that it recalls "Perry's singer-songwriter days at L.A.'s Hotel Café". Kitty Empire of The Guardian wrote that Perry's voice is wistful throughout the song and that the references to June Carter Cash and Johnny Cash were unexpected. Rob Sheffield from Rolling Stone stated that when Perry sings, 'I was June, and you were my Johnny Cash,' "it's understood that she's thinking of the scrubbed-up Hollywood version of June and Johnny, from Walk the Line." After the death of actor Johnny Lewis, media outlets speculated that the song was about him. In 2017, the singer revealed that "The One That Got Away" was about Josh Groban.

== Critical reception ==
Kerri Mason from Billboard described the song as "delectable", noting that it has more texture than anything on Perry's previous album, One of the Boys. Mikael Wood from Spin magazine said that although "Perry delivers the gurl-gone-wild stuff with requisite sass", she actually "sounds more engaged on 'Not Like the Movies,' and 'The One That Got Away'. Similarly, Kitty Empire from The Guardian praised the collaboration, stating that Perry and Luke are at their most appealing in the song. In a similar note, Rob Sheffield from Rolling Stone, stated that Perry is more at home with the mall romance of "The One That Got Away". The same opinion was echoed by Greg Kot from Chicago Tribune who felt that Perry sounds more invested in the more "serious" songs on the album, such as "The One That Got Away". However, he added that it's as if Perry is "determined to balance the summer frothiness with a few shots of 'adult' earnestness". Leah Greenblatt from Entertainment Weekly was not satisfied with the selection of the song as the sixth single, noting that there are better songs on the album that could have been chosen instead. Robert Copsey of the website Digital Spy awarded the song with four out of five stars and said:

"'Summer after high school, when we first met/ We make out in your Mustang, to Radiohead,' Katy Perry reminisces on the opening of her latest, potentially record-breaking single. We've always known that she had a penchant for the alt-rock, but we wonder if KP's 18-year-old self ever thought she'd be substituting the sounds of Thom Yorke and co. for the sugar-coated melodies that have made her one of the best-known artists on the planet today? 'Used to steal our parents' liquor, and climb through the roof/ Talk about our future, like we had a clue,' she continues over a toe-tapping drum beat and delicate piano riff as she agonises over the loss of her one true love. 'In another life, I would be your girl/ We'd keep all our promises/ Be us against the world,' she mourns on a chorus as instantly satisfying as a mugful of Kenco."

== Commercial performance ==
On the week ending October 29, 2011, "The One That Got Away" debuted at number 94 on the US Billboard Hot 100. In its sixth week, the song entered the top 10, making Teenage Dream one of only seven albums in Billboard's 53-year history to have six singles enter the top 10. On the chart dated December 24, 2011, the song entered the top five, making Teenage Dream the third album to have six or more top-five singles from one album on the chart following Rhythm Nation 1814 by Janet Jackson and Faith by George Michael. "The One That Got Away" eventually peaked at number three on the Hot 100, making it the only single from Teenage Dream to fail to reach number one. On the chart dated January 7, 2012, the song topped the Hot Dance Club Songs chart, the seventh track on the album to do so, setting a new record in the chart. Nielsen SoundScan reported that the song had shifted 2.8 million pure sales in the US as of February 2017. "The One That Got Away" was certified five-times Platinum by the Recording Industry Association of America (RIAA) in April 2022 for sales exceeding five million units. Elsewhere, the song reached the top five on the Canadian Hot 100, and the top 20 in Austria, Iceland, Ireland, New Zealand, Scotland, Turkey, and the UK singles chart. It has been certified seven-times Platinum in Australia and Canada, four-times Platinum in New Zealand, and three-times Platinum in Brazil and the United Kingdom. As of May 2022, "The One That Got Away" has sold 6.5 million pure copies worldwide.

Following the song's resurgence on social media, specifically on TikTok in April 2026, "The One That Got Away" entered multiple charts worldwide, including the Czech Republic, Greece, Lithuania, Malaysia, Norway, the Philippines Hot 100, Portugal, Singapore, and Slovakia. In the United Kingdom, the song re-entered the UK singles Chart at number 41 during the week ending May 8, 2026, with 11,140 sales aided by the release of the director's cut version of the music video. The following week, the song moved nine places to number 30 on the chart, selling 12,161 units. It has sold a total of 1,698,970 units as of July 2026, becoming Perry's ninth most-consumed track in the nation. "The One That Got Away" also reached number 23 on the Billboard Global 200, becoming her highest-charting entry since the chart's inception in September 2020. On Spotify, the track has garnered over 1.7 billion streams as of July 2026.

== Music video ==
=== Production and release ===
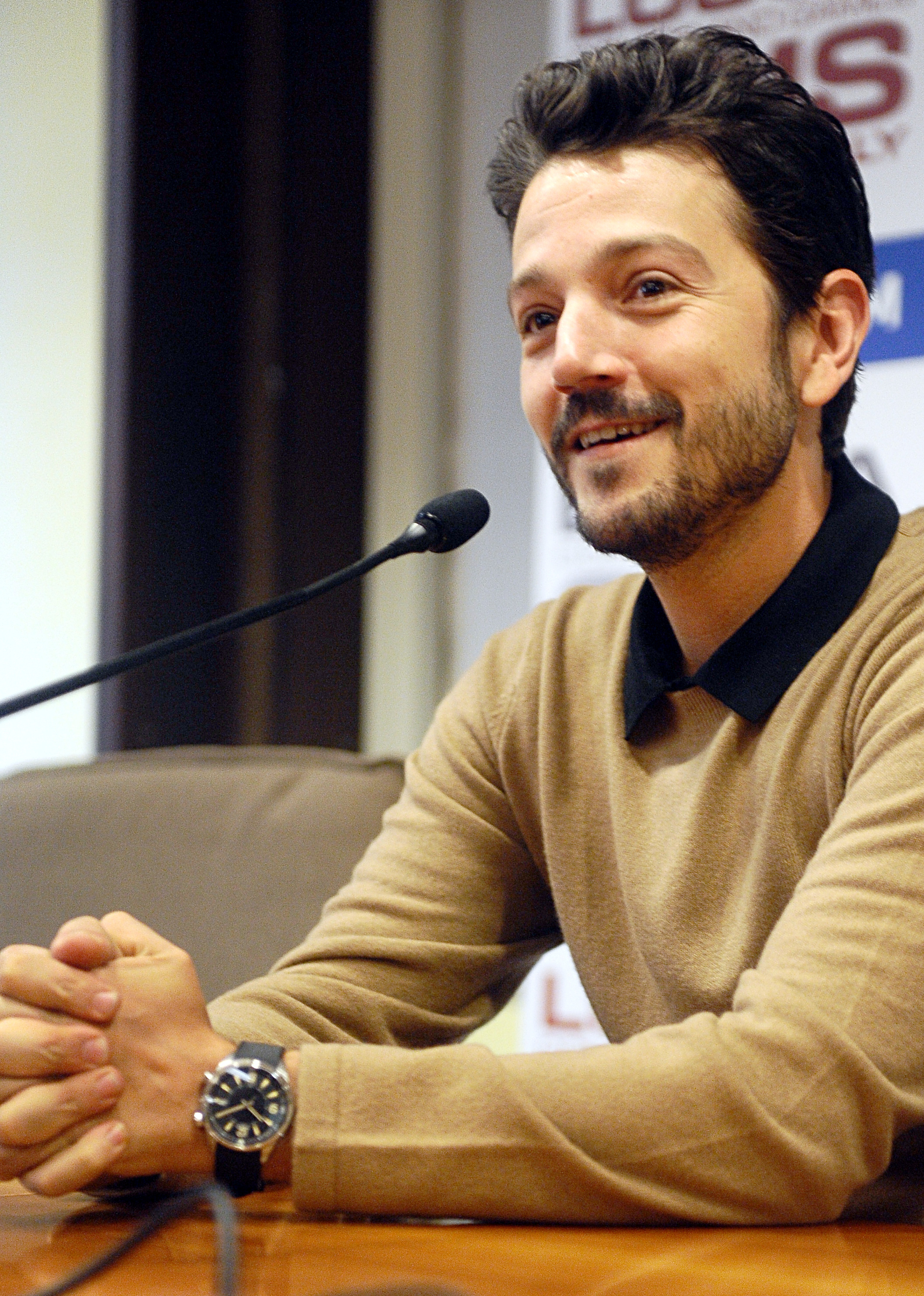
Diego Luna (pictured) plays Perry's love interest in the video.

Perry started filming for the video on September 30, 2011. Filming ended on October 2, 2011. The video was shot at the Lima Residence, a contemporary home located in Calabasas, an affluent city in Los Angeles County, California. Mexican actor Diego Luna plays Perry's boyfriend in the video. Photos from the set surfaced online, showing Perry wearing a long-sleeved dress as well as sporting gray hair and prosthetic face wrinkles. The video was directed by Floria Sigismondi, who previously directed the video for "E.T." The music video premiered on November 11, 2011.

On November 4, 2011, a teaser for the video was released, narrated by Stevie Nicks. Nicks provides the elderly woman's voice, speaking about the past and her desire to go back for one day. The video contains scenes of Katy Perry and her past boyfriend (Luna) fighting, intertwined with scenes of them in love. She is later shown as a nostalgic, elderly woman dressed conservatively and standing by a fence looking into the distance. A seven-minute extended version of the video was shown on November 11, 2011, exclusively at select advance screenings of the motion picture My Week with Marilyn (2011). The music video for "The One That Got Away" has garnered over 1.1 billion views on YouTube as of May 2026.

=== Synopsis ===
An aged Katy Perry in the music video for "The One That Got Away"

Released on November 11, 2011, the video begins with an elderly woman (Perry) entering her modernistic home. She walks past her husband (played by Herman Sinitzyn), who asks her "How was it?", to which she responds by simply saying "It was fine", hinting that the two are in a loveless marriage. While making herself a cup of coffee, the elderly woman, unhappy with her present situation, begins to think about her colorful past when the song begins: her younger self with her artist boyfriend (Luna) paint portraits of each other.

The elderly woman continues to reminisce about her past in her bedroom alone as the song plays: the happy girl and the boyfriend dress up wildly, take Polaroid photos of each other, dance at a stranger's wedding, and give each other a makeshift tattoo.

As the woman's younger self appears to her older self and both sing the bridge, we see the younger self and the boyfriend get into an argument; she has a creativity block and is unable to paint anything, so he forces her to paint, and in response she splashes red paint on his painting. He leaves angrily and drives away in a Ford Mustang to blow off steam from the fight.

The younger version is shown in her older self's closet, crying and singing while the boyfriend is seen driving in his car. At the same time in the present, the older woman is shown driving out of her garage in a similar type of car as the boyfriend is driving in the flashback.

While driving, the boyfriend opens the sun visor above him and finds the veil of the dress the younger version of Perry had worn at the wedding. He stares at the veil, hinting that he decides to make up with her. But he is too distracted by the veil and does not notice the large boulders on the road from a small rock slide. He swerves to avoid the rocks and accidentally drives off a cliff, dying in the subsequent crash without getting a chance to make up. Meanwhile, the woman's younger self collapses at the same time (possibly representing the death of her colorful youth and personality). The song ends as the sounds of the car violently rolling down the cliff are heard.

As Johnny Cash's cover of "You Are My Sunshine" plays quietly in the background, the woman's older self is revealed to have driven to that same spot where the boyfriend had died. She walks up to the edge of the cliff where the boyfriend (either a ghost or a hallucination) appears before her on the other side of the fence; the two hold hands, revealing matching tattoos on their hands. When the older woman snaps back to reality, the Johnny Cash music stops suddenly and the boyfriend vanishes. Saddened, the elderly woman turns back and silently walks away from the cliff to return home as the screen fades to black.

=== Reception ===
Jillian Mapes of Billboard commented that the video was "beautifully-shot" and praised the interesting plot. A writer of Rolling Stone wrote: "It's a cute clip for a sweet song, but the heavy-handed aging makeup is hard to get over." Erin Strecker from Entertainment Weekly compared the video with Titanic (1997) and Rihanna's video for "We Found Love". Strecker also noted that the video was more "tragic" than he was expecting from Perry. Jocelyn Vena of MTV News said: "Katy Perry's moody, contemplative clip for 'The One That Got Away' perfectly encapsulates both the joy of falling in love and the heartbreak of letting go. It travels through time and space and recalls the story of Perry's one that got away." Consequence's Chris Coplan called the video a "little more somber" than the videos Perry made for "E.T." and "Last Friday Night (T.G.I.F.)".

=== Other versions ===
The seven-minute director's cut version of the music video was shown exclusively at select advance screenings of the motion picture My Week with Marilyn on November 11, 2011. The extended version shows more to the plot of the original music video and includes never-before-seen footage, as well as extended dialogue between the characters. On April 21, 2026, Perry released the director's cut on her official YouTube channel. A teaser for the release, posted the previous day, included narration by Nicks.

On January 17, 2012, Electronic Arts announced that they would be teaming up with Perry to help promote their new expansion pack for The Sims game franchise called The Sims 3: Showtime, which sees the release of a limited collector's edition that contains in-game content based on herself. An official music video for "The One That Got Away" featuring Perry as a Sim was uploaded on EA's YouTube channel. The storyline shows a female Sim and a male Sim falling in love and getting married. One day, the male Sim collapses on the bathroom floor, he is taken to the hospital and then dies. His wife is then seen mourning at his funeral. Suddenly, she is transported "to another life", Katy Perry's Candyfornia featured in her "California Gurls" music video, where her love interest is still alive and well; they eventually reunite and kiss. It also features most of the in-game content that will be included for the collector's edition of The Sims 3: Showtime and in the stuff pack The Sims 3: Katy Perry's Sweet Treats.

== Live performances and other versions ==
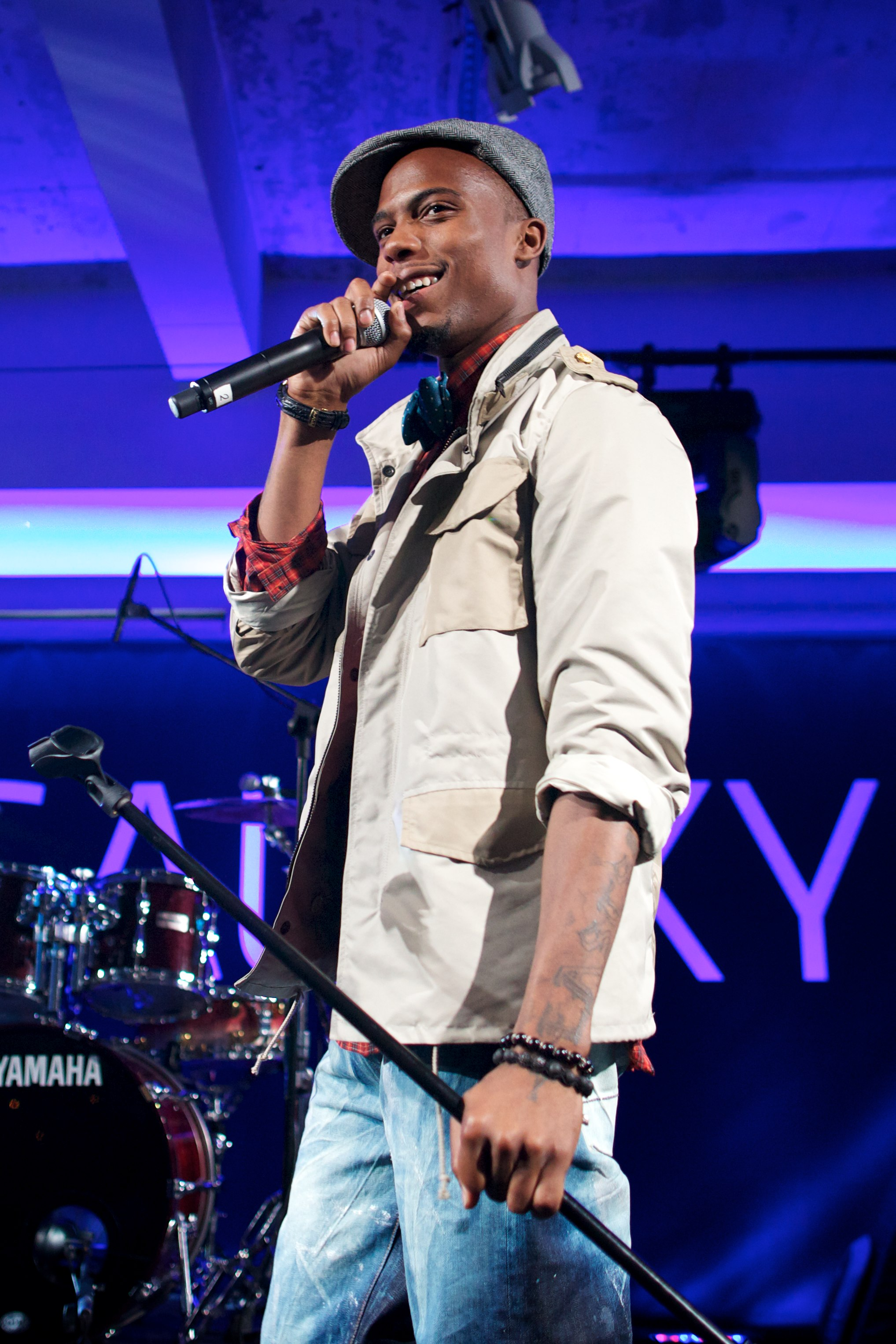
B.o.B was featured on the official remix of "The One That Got Away".

"The One That Got Away" was part of the setlist of Perry's worldwide 2011 concert tour, California Dreams Tour. On October 16, 2011, Perry performed the song on the UK version of The X Factor. Perry performed the song at the American Music Awards on November 20, 2011. Her AMA 2011 performance was followed by a lengthy standing ovation, and presentation of a special award acknowledging Perry as the only female to have five number-one singles from the same album in the United States.

A remix featuring American rapper B.o.B was released in December 2011. B.o.B added two new verses, one at the beginning and another replacing the bridge of the album version of the song. The decision for Capitol Records to release a remix and reduce the price of the song to give Perry a sixth number-one song has been criticized by some, noting that this is not Perry's first time adding a featured guest to her single releases. The hit single "E.T.", was modified with verses from Kanye West, while "Last Friday Night (T.G.I.F.)" was given a remix featuring Missy Elliott. However, Billboard, which compiles the charts, have issued multiple columns defending Perry and Capitol, underlining that they are operating under chart rules and that numerous other acts, such as Rihanna and Britney Spears, used the same tactics for charting purposes over the years. An acoustic version of the song, produced by Jon Brion, was released to the iTunes Store on January 16, 2012, garnering more favorable reviews, with critics noting that "The One That Got Away" sounded very natural as a ballad. The song was also included in the setlist of the Prismatic World Tour (2014-2015), in which it is interpolated with Perry's 2009 song "Thinking of You". "The One That Got Away" was not included in the setlist of the Lifetimes Tour (2025), but was performed as part of the "Choose Your Own Adventure" set in several shows.

A violin cover of the song by music student Grace Youn, which Youn had uploaded to YouTube in 2011, was used in the opening scene of Perry's 2012 documentary, Katy Perry: Part of Me. American Idol contestant Alyssa Raghu sang the song in front of Katy Perry on the Top 10 Reveal episode of Season 17. Both Tate McRae and Chappell Roan have covered "The One That Got Away," with the former delivering her version on BBC Radio 1's Live Lounge and the latter singing it in a couple of shows in 2023.

== Formats and track listings ==
- Digital download
1. "The One That Got Away" – 3:47
- Digital download – featuring B.o.B
1. "The One That Got Away" (featuring B.o.B) – 4:22
- Digital download – Acoustic version
1. "The One That Got Away" (Acoustic version) – 4:18
- Digital download – The Remixes EP
1. "The One That Got Away" (7th Heaven Club Mix) – 8:03
2. "The One That Got Away" (Mixin Marc & Tony Svejda Peak Hour Club Mix) – 5:44
3. "The One That Got Away" (R3hab Club Mix) – 5:49
4. "The One That Got Away" (Plastic Plates Club Mix) – 6:05
5. "The One That Got Away" (Tommie Sunshine & Disco Fries Club Mix) – 6:22
  - Digital download
  - streaming
  – Thinking of the One That Got Away EP
1. "The One That Got Away" – 3:47
2. "The One That Got Away" (Acoustic version) – 4:19
3. "Thinking of You" – 4:06
4. "Thinking of You" (Acoustic version) – 4:51
5. "Thinking of You" (Live at MTV Unplugged, 2009) – 4:38
6. "Legendary Lovers" – 3:44

== Credits and personnel ==
Credits adapted from Teenage Dream album liner notes.

- Katy Perry – songwriting, lead vocals, guitar (acoustic version)
- Dr. Luke – songwriting, producer, drums, keyboards, programming
- Max Martin – songwriting, producer, drums, keyboards, programming
- Emily Wright – engineer
- Sam Holland – engineer
- Tatiana Gottwald – assistant engineer
- Serban Ghenea – mixing
- Jon Hanes – mix engineer
- Tim Roberts – assistant mix engineer
- Leon Pendarvis – string arrangement, conductor

== Charts ==
=== Weekly charts ===
Weekly chart performance
| Chart (2011–2012) | Peak position |
|---|---|
| Australia (ARIA) | 27 |
| Austria (Ö3 Austria Top 40) | 19 |
| Belgium (Ultratop 50 Flanders) | 33 |
| Belgium (Ultratop 50 Wallonia) | 44 |
| Brazil (Billboard Brasil Hot 100) | 27 |
| Brazil Hot Pop Songs | 10 |
| Canada Hot 100 (Billboard) | 2 |
| CIS Airplay (TopHit) | 45 |
| Czech Republic Airplay (ČNS IFPI) | 47 |
| France (SNEP) | 30 |
| Germany (GfK) | 34 |
| Hungary (Rádiós Top 40) | 3 |
| Indonesia (Official Southeast Asia Charts) | 10 |
| Iceland (Tónlistinn) | 16 |
| Ireland (IRMA) | 13 |
| Italy (FIMI) | 39 |
| Japan (Japan Hot 100) | 62 |
| Mexico Anglo (Monitor Latino) | 8 |
| Mexico (Billboard Mexican Airplay) | 23 |
| Netherlands (Dutch Top 40) | 21 |
| Netherlands (Single Top 100) | 66 |
| New Zealand (Recorded Music NZ) | 12 |
| Romania (Romanian Top 100) | 75 |
| Russia Airplay (TopHit) | 47 |
| Scottish Singles Sales (Official Charts) | 17 |
| Slovakia Airplay (ČNS IFPI) | 7 |
| South Korea (Circle) | 78 |
| South Korea International Download Singles (Gaon) | 2 |
| Spain (Promusicae) | 42 |
| Sweden (Sverigetopplistan) | 48 |
| Switzerland (Schweizer Hitparade) | 33 |
| Turkey (Number One Top 20) | 17 |
| UK Singles (Official Charts) | 18 |
| Ukraine Airplay (TopHit) | 20 |
| US Adult Contemporary (Billboard) | 5 |
| US Adult Pop Airplay (Billboard) | 1 |
| US Billboard Hot 100 | 3 |
| US Bubbling Under R&B/Hip-Hop Songs (Billboard) | 7 |
| US Dance Club Songs (Billboard) | 1 |
| US Dance Airplay (Billboard) | 2 |
| US Dance Singles Sales (Billboard) | 2 |
| US Latin Airplay (Billboard) | 36 |
| US Pop Airplay (Billboard) | 1 |
| US Rhythmic Airplay (Billboard) | 19 |
| Venezuela Pop Rock (Record Report) | 4 |

| Chart (2026) | Peak position |
|---|---|
| Austria (Ö3 Austria Top 40) | 9 |
| Czech Republic Singles Digital (ČNS IFPI) | 24 |
| Germany (GfK) | 16 |
| Global 200 (Billboard) | 23 |
| Greece International (IFPI) | 23 |
| Indonesia (IFPI) | 10 |
| Ireland (IRMA) | 28 |
| Lithuania (AGATA) | 83 |
| Luxembourg (Billboard) | 9 |
| Malaysia (IFPI) | 2 |
| Malaysia International (RIM) | 2 |
| Norway (IFPI Norge) | 70 |
| Philippines (IFPI) | 15 |
| Philippines (Philippines Hot 100) | 12 |
| Portugal (AFP) | 29 |
| Singapore (RIAS) | 7 |
| Slovakia Singles Digital (ČNS IFPI) | 39 |
| Sweden (Sverigetopplistan) | 54 |
| Switzerland (Schweizer Hitparade) | 22 |
| UK Singles (Official Charts) | 24 |

=== Monthly charts ===
Monthly chart performance
| Chart (2012) | Peak position |
|---|---|
| Ukraine Airplay (TopHit) | 23 |

=== Year-end charts ===
Year-end chart performance
| Chart (2011) | Position |
|---|---|
| UK Singles (Official Charts) | 153 |

Year-end chart performance
| Chart (2012) | Position |
|---|---|
| Canada (Canadian Hot 100) | 20 |
| France (SNEP) | 154 |
| Hungary (Rádiós Top 40) | 56 |
| UK Singles (Official Charts Company) | 123 |
| Ukraine Airplay (TopHit) | 55 |
| US Billboard Hot 100 | 41 |
| US Adult Contemporary (Billboard) | 10 |
| US Adult Top 40 (Billboard) | 15 |
| US Dance Club Songs (Billboard) | 21 |
| US Dance/Mix Show Airplay (Billboard) | 24 |
| US Mainstream Top 40 (Billboard) | 14 |
| US Radio Songs (Billboard) | 20 |

== Certifications and sales ==
Certifications for "The One That Got Away"
| Region | Certification | Certified units/sales |
|---|---|---|
| Australia (ARIA) | 7× Platinum | 490,000^{‡} |
| Austria (IFPI Austria) | Platinum | 30,000^{*} |
| Brazil (Pro-Música Brasil) | 3× Platinum | 180,000^{‡} |
| Canada (Music Canada) | 7× Platinum | 560,000^{‡} |
| Denmark (IFPI Danmark) | Platinum | 90,000^{‡} |
| Finland | 2× Platinum | 8,000 |
| France (SNEP) | Platinum | 200,000^{‡} |
| Germany (BVMI) | Platinum | 600,000^{‡} |
| Italy (FIMI) | Gold | 15,000^{‡} |
| Mexico (AMPROFON) | Gold | 30,000^{*} |
| New Zealand (RMNZ) | 4× Platinum | 120,000^{‡} |
| South Korea (Gaon) Remix featuring B.o.B | — | 285,939 |
| Spain (Promusicae) | Platinum | 60,000^{‡} |
| United Kingdom (BPI) | 3× Platinum | 1,800,000^{‡} |
| United States (RIAA) | 5× Platinum | 5,000,000^{‡} |
Streaming
| Greece (IFPI Greece) | Platinum | 2,000,000^{†} |
Summaries
| Worldwide | — | 6,500,000 |
^{*} Sales figures based on certification alone.^{‡} Sales+streaming figures based on certification alone.^{†} Streaming-only figures based on certification alone.

== Release history ==
Release dates and formats for "The One That Got Away"
| Region | Date | Format(s) | Version | Label(s) | Ref. |
|---|---|---|---|---|---|
| France | September 30, 2011 | Radio airplay | Original | Universal | |
| United States | October 11, 2011 | Contemporary hit radio; rhythmic contemporary radio | Original | Capitol | |
| Italy | October 28, 2011 | Radio airplay | Original | EMI; Polydor | |
| United States | October 31, 2011 | Adult contemporary radio; hot adult contemporary radio; modern adult contemporary | Original | Capitol | |
| Various | December 2, 2011 | Digital download | The remixes | Capitol | |
| United States | December 15, 2011 | Contemporary hit radio; rhythmic contemporary radio | Remix featuring B.o.B | Capitol | |
| Various | December 20, 2011 | Digital download | Remix featuring B.o.B | Capitol | |
| Various | January 16, 2012 | Digital download | Acoustic | Capitol | |

== See also ==
- List of Billboard Dance Club Songs number ones of 2012
- List of Billboard Hot 100 top-ten singles in 2012
