= Both of Us =

2012 single by B.o.B featuring Taylor Swift

Single by B.o.B featuring Taylor Swift

from the album Strange Clouds
- Released: May 22, 2012
- Recorded: 2011
- Studio: Conway Recording Studios (Los Angeles, CA); eightysevenfourteen studios (Los Angeles, CA); B.o.B's Basement Studios (Atlanta, GA)
- Genre: Country rap
- Length: 3:36
- Label: Grand Hustle; Rebel Rock; Atlantic
- Songwriters: B.o.B; Taylor Swift; Ammar Malik; Lukasz Gottwald; Henry Walter
- Producers: Dr. Luke; Cirkut

B.o.B singles chronology
"So Good" (2012)	"Both of Us" (2012)	"Out of My Mind" (2012)

Taylor Swift singles chronology
"Eyes Open" (2012)	"Both of Us" (2012)	"We Are Never Ever Getting Back Together" (2012)

Music video
- "Both of Us" on YouTube

"Both of Us" is a song by American rapper B.o.B, released on May 22, 2012, as the third single from his second studio album, Strange Clouds (2012). The song features vocals from American singer-songwriter Taylor Swift. The artists co-wrote the song alongside Ammar Malik and the song's producers Dr. Luke and Cirkut.

"Both of Us" was released to critical acclaim, most praising Swift's feature, with some calling the collaboration as a sweet and melodic catchy song. It debuted on the Australian Singles Chart at number 46. The song sold 143,000 copies in its first week of release in the United States, debuting at number 18 on the US Billboard Hot 100 and became the week's top debut.

== Background ==
The lyrics of "Both of Us" talks about racism and bullying. It was Swift who came up with the idea for the collaboration after she visited B.o.B's label, Grand Hustle Records. The rapper explained, "She came to Atlanta and she hit up Grand Hustle. I wasn't there. Tip was there and I eventually linked with her in Dallas and the rest is history." This is not the first time Swift contributed to a hip hop song; her other collaborations include a song with T-Pain at the 2009 CMT Music Awards, and inviting T.I., Nicki Minaj, and Flo Rida to her Speak Now World Tour in 2011.

== Music video ==
The music video, directed by Jake Nava, was released on June 27, 2012. B.o.B announced the video on Twitter, sharing a photo and a release date time frame: "On the set of the #BothOfUs music video in Nashville with @taylorswift13. Video premieres end of June!".

=== Synopsis ===
The video begins with B.o.B standing before a small American flag then cuts to Swift singing the song's hook in a dark lit pool hall. B.o.B then takes to the train tracks and streets to deliver his verses while Swift croons the hook in a picturesque field while donning a white cotton dress, and shows a dog that leaves Swift awestruck with his high flying antics. Footage of the artists is interspliced with scenes of life in Nashville's less glamorous neighborhoods like tatted locals, cowboy-boot-wearing young women, shirtless youths playing in sprinklers, teens kissing, a mobile home (this leaves viewers knowing that the video isn't glamorous, but instead leaves viewers appreciating the little things in life – It's not about the money, it's understanding that a romp through a sprinkler or a good game of billiards is enough to take you away from the mundane moments of everyday life). As the first chorus precedes Swift is shown singing at a field covered with dandelions and flowers and several shots of B.o.B and Swift are interspliced. As the video closes out, viewers are left with a sort of fantasy, with B.o.B and Swift re-imagined as the every man and every woman living simple life in rural Tennessee, much like the folks in the video. At the end, B.o.B. is seen standing in a driveway with a car backing up and B.o.B staring at it.

== Chart performance ==
The song was successful in Australia and New Zealand, charting within the top ten in both Australia and New Zealand. It debuted on the Australian Singles Chart at number 46 and eventually peaked at number five. The song also peaked at number ten in New Zealand. The song sold 143,000 copies in its first week, along with the album release, debuting at number 18 on the US Billboard Hot 100 and became the week's top debut. The single sold over 1,000,000 digital copies as of November 2017.

== Live performances ==
Swift performed the song with B.o.B on April 19, 2013 in the State Farm Arena in Atlanta when the rapper was invited as a surprise guest for the show for Swift's Red Tour.

== Charts ==
=== Weekly charts ===
Weekly chart performance for "Both of Us"
Chart (2012)	Peak position
Australia (ARIA)	5
Australia Urban (ARIA)	1
Canada (Canadian Hot 100)	23
Canada CHR/Top 40 (Billboard)	42
Ireland (IRMA)	26
New Zealand (Recorded Music NZ)	10
Poland (Polish Airplay New)	4
Scotland Singles (OCC)	19
UK Singles (OCC)	22
UK R&B Chart	5
US Billboard Hot 100	18
US Mainstream Top 40 (Billboard)	24

=== Year-end charts ===
Year-end chart performance for "Both of Us"
Chart (2012)	Position
Australia (ARIA)	92

== Certifications ==
Certifications for "Both of Us"
Region	Certification	Certified units/sales
Australia (ARIA)	Platinum	70,000^{^}
New Zealand (RMNZ)	Platinum	15,000^{*}
United States (RIAA)	Platinum	1,000,000^{‡}
^{*} Sales figures based on certification alone.^{^} Shipments figures based on certification alone.^{‡} Sales+streaming figures based on certification alone.

== Release history ==
Release history and formats for "Both of Us"
Country	Date	Format	Label
Various	May 22, 2012	Digital download	Atlantic
United States	May 22, 2012	Contemporary hit radio	Atlantic; Grand Hustle; Rebel Rock
United Kingdom	July 22, 2012	Digital download	Atlantic
