= Out of My Mind (B.o.B song) =

Single by B.o.B featuring Nicki Minaj

from the album Strange Clouds
- Released: October 8, 2012
- Recorded: 2012
- Genre: Hip hop; dubstep
- Length: 3:36
- Label: Grand Hustle; Rebel Rock; Atlantic
- Songwriters: Bobby Ray Simmons, Jr.; Justin Franks; Alexander Grant; Stephen Joshua Hill; Mathieu Jomphe; Jones; Clarence Montgomery III; Onika Tanya Maraj; Gottwald; Jeremy "Kinetics" Dussolliet; Tim "One Love" Sommers
- Producers: Dr. Luke; Billboard

B.o.B singles chronology
"Both of Us" (2012)	"Out of My Mind" (2012)	"We Still in This Bitch" (2012)

Nicki Minaj singles chronology
"Pound the Alarm" (2012)	"Out of My Mind" (2012)	"The Boys" (2012)

Audio sample
- "Out of My Mind": file; help

Music video
- "Out of My Mind" on YouTube

"Out of My Mind" is a song by American rapper B.o.B from his second album Strange Clouds (2012). The song features Nicki Minaj and was produced by Dr. Luke and Billboard. "Out of My Mind" was the fifth single released from the album. The song was primarily written by B.o.B, Nicki Minaj, DJ Frank E, and Alex da Kid.

== Reception ==
"Out of My Mind" was met with generally positive reviews upon release, particularly due to Minaj's verse in the song. Some compared it to her verse on Kanye West's "Monster" where critics say Minaj "stole the show". Kyle Anderson of EW.com stated, "Out of My Mind is an impressive testament to [B.o.B's] infectious, unflappable cool. The guy knows how to hang in nearly every sonic situation, and master it — just like a real rock star." Anderson named "Out of My Mind" as one of the best tracks on the album, along with "So Hard to Breathe". According to the Universal Music Group, the song was written in 2009.

Andrew Unterberger gave the song a "3 star" rating, criticizing B.o.B, by saying, "Really, it was never a fair fight. B.o.B. seems like a very nice young man, but intimidatingly deranged he is not, and his verses (featuring couplets like 'I was doing fine / Until my brain left, and it didn't say bye' and 'I am a rebel but yes I'm so militant / Still I'm eligible for disabilities') are as convincing of his insanity as a 12-year-old telling an obviously fraudulent story of the action he got last summer at overnight camp." Unterberger also complimented Nicki Minaj's verse.

== Music video ==
The music video was directed by Benny Boom and was filmed in Detroit the week of July 16, 2012. A behind-the-scenes video was released on August 13. On August 10, B.o.B himself confirmed via Twitter that he would release the music video on August 15, but it failed to meet its premiere date. It is set in a mental hospital. Minaj is also seen rapping alongside B.o.B. Minaj is referenced as "Dr. Minaj" for a brief moment in the video, just as her verse begins. The video made its full premiere on August 23, 2012 on BET's 106 & Park and shortly after, uploaded to B.o.B's official YouTube account. Fans have noted that the song's lyrics and Minaj's role in the video are reminiscent of DC Comics supervillain Harley Quinn's origin story.

== Live performances ==
Minaj performed her verse in a medley on her Pink Friday: Reloaded Tour.

== Chart performance ==
Chart (2012)	Peak position
UK Singles Chart (Official Charts Company)	197
UK R&B (Official Charts Company)	30

== Certifications ==
Region	Certification	Certified units/sales
United States (RIAA)	Gold	500,000^{‡}
^{‡} Sales+streaming figures based on certification alone.
