= Play the Guitar =

Single by B.o.B featuring André 3000
- Released: December 27, 2011
- Recorded: 2011
- Genre: Hip hop
- Length: 3:24
- Label: Grand Hustle; Atlantic
- Songwriters: Bobby Ray Simmons Jr.; André Lauren Benjamin; Salaam Remi Gibbs; Clifford Joseph Harris Jr.; Bo Diddley
- Producer: Salaam Remi

B.o.B singles chronology
"The One That Got Away" (2011)	"Play the Guitar" (2011)	"Am I a Psycho?" (2012)

André 3000 singles chronology
"Party" (2011)	"Play the Guitar" (2011)	"I Do" (2012)

Music video
- "Play the Guitar" on YouTube

"Play the Guitar" is a song by American hip hop recording artist B.o.B, featuring fellow American rapper André 3000. Produced by Salaam Remi, it is a guitar driven hip hop song that samples "Bo Diddley" as performed by Bo Diddley as well as "Fancy" as performed by Drake, Swizz Beatz and T.I. It was recorded for his second studio album, Strange Clouds (2012), however failed to make the final cut.

== Background ==
Mack of Sound-Savvy was invited to the October 25th listening session at Tree Sound Studios. B.o.B played 8 songs from the album for a private audience, then sat down with Mack of Sound-Savvy to talk about the new album. One of the tracks premiered was "Play the Guitar", B.o.B’s ode to his instrument of choice. He describes the song as one that expresses his "love for music and love for the guitar".

The song features André 3000, who rarely does guest appearances for other artists. Of the song, B.o.B says: "I feel like it shows people that we are two different artists and we actually do sound different and have our own styles. Not to say that I wasn’t influenced by Outkast and Andre, but I feel like it’s a ‘pass-the-torch’ type of moment. He really gave me a lot of love on the feature and I’m looking forward to hearing what people have to say about it.”

The song's hook features a sample of T.I.’s verse from Drake’s ‘Fancy’. B.o.B. introduced this one with his origins on playing the guitar, which he picked up after urges from his brother.

When asked if it was T.I.'s line on "Fancy" that inspired the song, B.o.B responded: "I was in the studio with [producer] Salaam Remi and it seemed like it all came together at the same time. We were listening to an old Bo Diddley record and we were like, ‘let’s take this and put it in the club,’ because it has that classic guitar feel, and he was like ‘yeah man you play the guitar on it, we can add a guitar lick in there.’ Then I was like, ‘we should put the “feel good, play the guitar / feel good” and so we actually had to get [it]. We had Tip’s engineer send us over his verse [from the Drake song] and we chopped it up, and we put it in there. And the actual thing is, [Tip] went back and rerecorded it, with his voice. It really was a ... I think it was meant to happen. And then Andre got on it, and that was great. Plus, the guitar solo [Andre] did was great. So it really came out the way we planned it, and structured it."

== Music video ==
The music video was released on August 8, 2012. The video shows the Atlanta rapper - as well as other pixelated objects and words - represented as black-and-white dots. However Andre 3000, like most of his music videos as a featured artist, does not appear in the video.

== Chart performance ==
The song debuted on the U.S. Billboard Hot 100, on the week of January 14, 2012, at number 98.

== Charts ==
Chart (2012)	Peak position
South Korea International Singles (Gaon)	16
US Billboard Hot 100	98

== Release history ==
Country	Date	Format	Label
United States	December 27, 2011	Digital download	Atlantic Records
