= Am I a Psycho? =

Single by Tech N9ne featuring B.o.B and Hopsin

from the album All 6's and 7's
- Released: January 22, 2012
- Recorded: 2011
- Genre: Horrorcore
- Length: 3:28
- Label: Strange
- Songwriters: Aaron Dontez Yates; Marcus Hopson; Bobby Ray Simmons Jr.
- Producer: B.o.B

Tech N9ne singles chronology
"The Noose" (2011)	"Am I a Psycho?" (2012)	"Badlands" (2012)

B.o.B singles chronology
"Play the Guitar" (2011)	"Am I a Psycho?" (2012)	"So Good" (2012)

Hopsin singles chronology
"How You Like Me Now?" (2011)	"Am I a Psycho?" (2012)	"Hop Madness" (2012)

Music video
- "Am I A Psycho?" on YouTube

"Am I a Psycho?" is a song by American rapper Tech N9ne, from his eleventh studio album All 6's and 7's. The song features vocals from fellow American rappers B.o.B and Hopsin. In the song, each rapper’s verse is based on the concept of insanity.

== Background ==
=== History ===
Tech N9ne was supposed to be featured on B.o.B's mixtape; B.o.B wanted to do a song with Tech for his mixtape, "No Genres", but was unable to get hold of him. Eventually the two did meet and B.o.B gave Tech a beat, which would end up being used for the song. Hopsin, who was featured on the record, claims that he feels this song was his mainstream debut. B.o.B was the first to record his verse, after he finished, Tech N9ne sent the track over to Hopsin, who recorded his verse afterwards.

=== Lyrics and composition ===
Each rapper has a different lyrical topic based on the song's main concept, insanity. Tech N9ne's verse revolves around a BDSM fantasy, caused by confusion thinking that a regular woman's a hooker. Hopsin's verse is more aimed towards insanity, claiming that Heaven is to blame if he goes to Hell. He also mentions the likelihood of becoming a successful rapper standing against so many other people. He closes his verse by claiming that he has no remorse for his self-injuries. B.o.B's verse follows. It has been assumed that the verse is a response to OFWGKTA frontman Tyler, The Creator, who dissed B.o.B in his song "Yonkers", after the former's previous diss "No Future" got praise from Tyler. However B.o.B claims that he has no interest in feuding with Tyler saying "the whole beef thing is kinda lame".

== Music video ==
=== Plot and development ===
While performing on the Lost Cities Tour, Tech N9ne announced at a concert that B.o.B, Hopsin, and himself would be shooting a music video for the song on November 29, 2011 The video was shot in Atlanta, which is where B.o.B is from. The music video premiered on MTV2's "Sucker Free Sunday" on January 22. Tech N9ne encouraged all of his fans to tune in to "be participating in the shift Strange Music has been thriving for since it began". Based on traditional slasher films, the music video depicts two people tied together, Tech N9ne, dressed as Michael Myers, scares them while performing his verse. Hopsin then walks to the house with a chainsaw, dressed as Jason Voorhees. After arriving at the house, he assists Tech in scaring the two people. Meanwhile, B.o.B, dressed as Norman Bates, is seen throughout the video freaking out in a room. When his verse starts, he proceeds down the stairs and watches as Hopsin and Tech N9ne scare the people. During the chorus, Tech N9ne can be seen standing outside the house without his mask on.

=== Reception ===
The music video received a lot of attention from networks, often being called a horror movie-music video hybrid. David Greenwald of MTV called it a "sequel" to "Martians vs. Goblins", another popular horror-influenced music video at the time.

== Certifications ==
Region	Certification	Certified units/sales
New Zealand (RMNZ)	Gold	15,000^{‡}
United States (RIAA)	Platinum	1,000,000^{‡}
^{‡} Sales+streaming figures based on certification alone.
