= Knock Madness =

Album by Hopsin

Studio album by Hopsin
- Released: November 24, 2013
- Recorded: 2011–2013
- Genres: Hip-hop; horrorcore
- Length: 74:26
- Labels: Funk Volume; EMPIRE
- Producer: Hopsin

Hopsin chronology
Raw (2010)	Knock Madness (2013)	Pound Syndrome (2015)

Singles from Knock Madness
- 1. "Ill Mind Six: Old Friend" Released: July 18, 2013; 2. "Hop Is Back" Released: October 22, 2013; 3. "Rip Your Heart Out" Released: November 12, 2013

Knock Madness is the third studio album by American rapper Hopsin. It was released on November 24, 2013, by Funk Volume and distributed by EMPIRE. Hopsin has said that the overall vibe of the album is different from his previous album Raw and that he has said all he needs to about leaving Ruthless Records. The album contains guest appearances from rappers SwizZz, Dizzy Wright, Jarren Benton, and Tech N9ne, among others. Like its predecessors, the album's production was entirely handled by Hopsin himself.

Knock Madness was supported by three singles, "Old Friend", "Hop Is Back", and "Rip Your Heart Out", the last of which features Tech N9ne. Hopsin also supported the album with the Fuck It Tour with Yelawolf, and the Knock Madness Tour. Knock Madness was met with generally positive reviews from music critics. The album also peaked at number 76 on the US Billboard 200 and, as of December 2013, has sold 16,000 copies according to Nielsen SoundScan.

== Background ==
Hopsin spoke about the album in an interview with HipHopDX on August 12, 2011, where he said that he was aiming to make the production quality of Knock Madness sound just as good, if not better, than his perception of Dr. Dre's upcoming album, Detox. He also stated that the album would have a "positive message" and that when people listen to the album he wants them to feel "inspired to be better in life". On January 20, 2012, he stated via his Twitter account that Knock Madness was his main priority in life.

He later spoke on the background of the album's sound, saying,

I'm 28 years old, and I see that I'm kind of in this weird position. I don't have many friends in my personal life, but I have so many fans. So when I go outside and people recognize me, it's kind of a bittersweet feeling, like I don't recognize the fans. I don't really have it like they probably think I have it. I'm really still a loser guy, but I'm just really popular now. I don't have a girlfriend no more, and I have this money, but I'm not satisfied with my life. It's this weird feeling of being incomplete, and I need to find myself. So that's kind of what it did to me, and the album just came out with me just fucking rapping some dark shit.

== Recording and production ==
Following the RAW Tour in mid-2011, Hopsin begun working on Knock Madness, though not very heavily. On January 17, 2012, fellow Funk Volume rappers SwizZz and Dizzy Wright were confirmed to make appearances on the album. In a March 2012 interview, Hopsin said that he talked to Tech N9ne about appearing on the album, which Tech N9ne agreed to. He also stated in 2012 that he wanted Yelawolf on the album.

In September 2012, Hopsin confirmed that he would self-produce the majority of the album, with drummer Travis Barker producing one or two tracks. Later that month, Hopsin would indicate interest in working with Childish Gambino. In addition, Hopsin approached Macklemore in January 2013 to get him featured in the album.

In February 2013, Hopsin stated in an interview that he was currently recording the album, having recorded 18 songs, and that he hoped to have the album completed by June. Hopsin begun heavily recording Knock Madness in March 2013 following the end of a long-term relationship, which gave him more time to record and focus on his music. He also indicated the album would be released with a bonus CD that will have all the 'Ill Mind of Hopsin' songs remastered, however this ultimately did not take place. In October 2013, Hopsin confirmed that he had finished recording the album and had turned it in to Funk Volume, stating he had personally re-mastered the album 20-30 times to get the sound just right.

== Music and lyrics ==
Hopsin detailed the album to The Source saying,

There's a variety of music on there. There's crazy, wild lyrics. There's sad, emotional lyrics and even funny lyrics. I got serious songs and sad songs. Just a big variety of everything. I wanted to show the full me. I have a lot of people who love me, but I have a lot of haters as well. There are at least one or two songs for someone that doesn't really like me or what I put out. I think they'll stumble across a couple songs that will make them go, oh ok, I fucks with him now. I kinda wanted to make an album to show my wide range of music that I can do. I just wanted to show the full me.

In the lead single "Hop Is Back", Hopsin pokes fun at Kendrick Lamar and disses Kanye West's newer music. Hopsin clarified his statements in an interview with HipHopDX saying he had no ill feelings towards Kendrick Lamar, and that he dissed West because he disliked his new music. "Tears to Snow" is an emotional song about him and his ex-girlfriend having relationship issues and breaking up. In the song he explains how she would assume he would cheat on her. The second verse is also partly about how Hopsin's former colleagues have changed and turned against him. For "Rip Your Heart Out" featuring Tech N9ne, Hopsin created what he called a "weird, funky, dope beat that you can just bop your head to."

Hopsin spoke on "Hip Hop Sinister" saying, "That's probably the most intense rap song on the album. It's not a song that's going to slowly change anybody's life. It's just a rap song just have bars and sound dope. The energy on that, you'll probably hear it and want to cut somebody's throat. The song just amps you up so much. It's so hyped to where you want to punch a hole in somebody's head or punch a hole through the wall." "Good Guys Get Left Behind" is a love song, that features multiple twists and turns. "Old Friend" is based around a friend of his that became addicted to methamphetamine and the personal issues which he suffered from it. Hopsin has said the meaning of the song was "to show what early wrong decisions can do to youngsters in the long run", as well as "what they can possibly miss out on."

"Lunch Time Cypher" was meant to give the feeling of a high school cypher, complete with beatboxing, random, crazy lyrics from Hopsin, and featured artists Passionate MC and G-Mo Skee. The song "What's My Purpose" is, according to Hopsin, "about a human born into this current dark society. How everybody is doing the same thing. Nobody is really different. And the government has us here to just make money." He also touches on his race-related arrest after a concert in Orlando, Florida. The album's outro "Caught In the Rain" discusses about how Hopsin is soul-searching and needing to find himself.

== Release and promotion ==
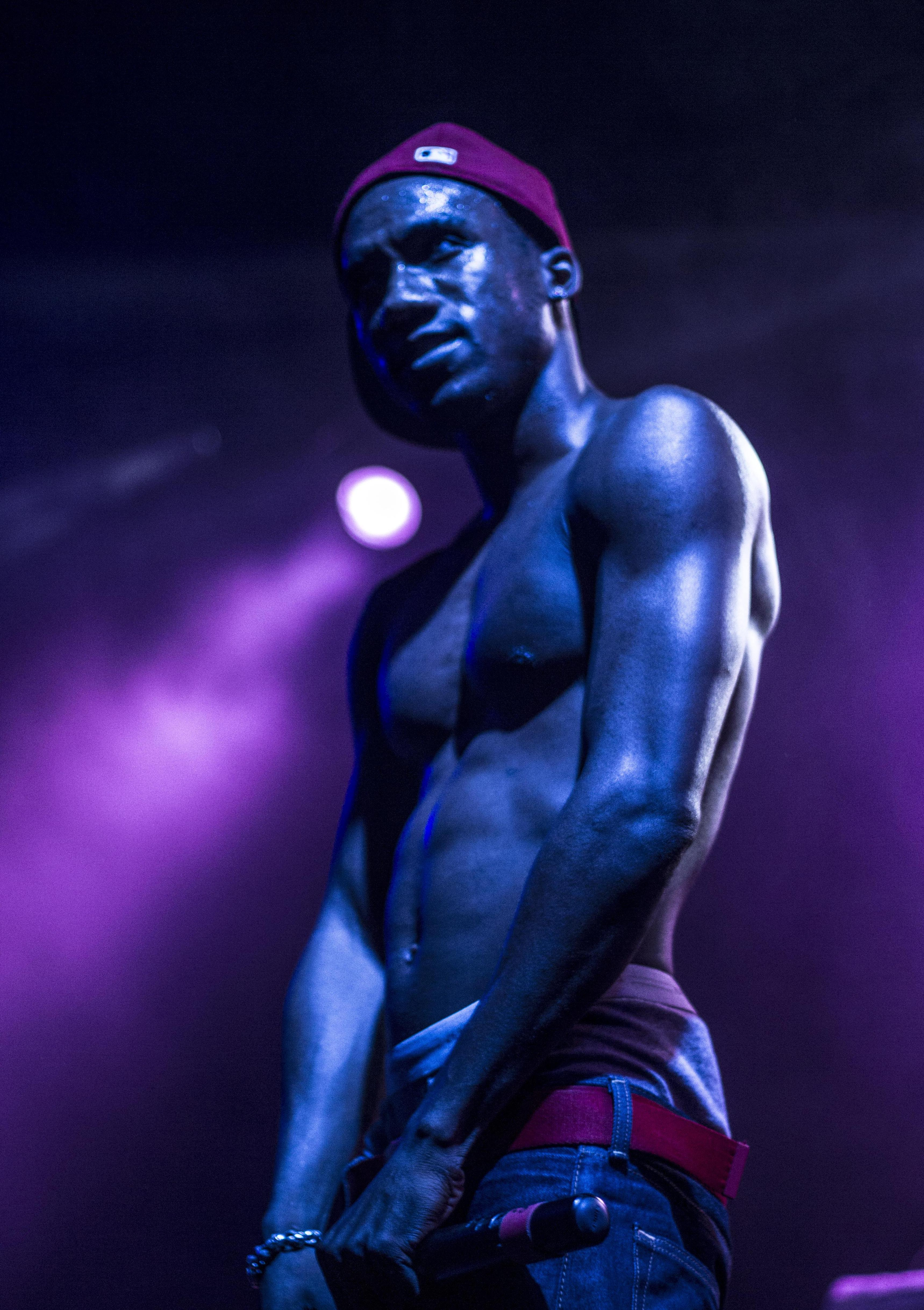
Hopsin performing on tour in promotion of Knock Madness.

In July 2012, Hopsin released the fifth installment of his "Ill Mind of Hopsin" video series. It received over one million views in less than 24 hours and currently has over 104 million views. In "Ill Mind of Hopsin 5", Hopsin expresses his frustration with jaded youth and disenchantment towards other rappers who are unrelatable. The song itself charted at number 17 on Billboard's Hot R&B/Hip-Hop Digital songs chart.

In December 2012, Hopsin hinted on his Facebook and Twitter pages that he and Travis Barker were working on a project together, though further details were withheld at the time. Then, in late December, Travis Barker revealed that a collaboration EP would be released in 2013. Then, on February 5, 2013, Hopsin announced that production for the EP had been finished.

In February 2013, Hopsin said the album would be released around September 2013. The album cover for Knock Madness, as well as the album's release date of November 26, 2013, was revealed at the end of the music video for "Ill Mind Six: Old Friend". The cover artwork depicts Marcus Hopson burying his rap alter ego Hopsin.

On September 11, 2013, Hopsin debuted a new vlog series about the making of the album. The series focused on how he got inspired, came up with lyrics, and mixed the songs for Knock Madness. On November 7, 2013, Hopsin released the album's track listing.

=== Touring ===
Hopsin, with the rest of the Funk Volume artists, went on a two-month worldwide tour in late 2012, which included 58 shows in 60 days throughout the United States, Europe and Australia. From November 14 to November 23, 2013, Hopsin toured with Shady Records artist Yelawolf in promotion of Knock Madness on The Fuck It Tour. They toured the West Coast of the United States and Hopsin performed material from the album for the first time. The Knock Madness World Tour began on December 12, 2013, in Australia. On January 18, 2014, the tour moved to North America, starting in Santa Cruz, California. The leg of the tour ran through March 22, 2014. Dizzy Wright and DJ Hoppa joined Hopsin on select dates during the North American run of the tour.

== Singles ==
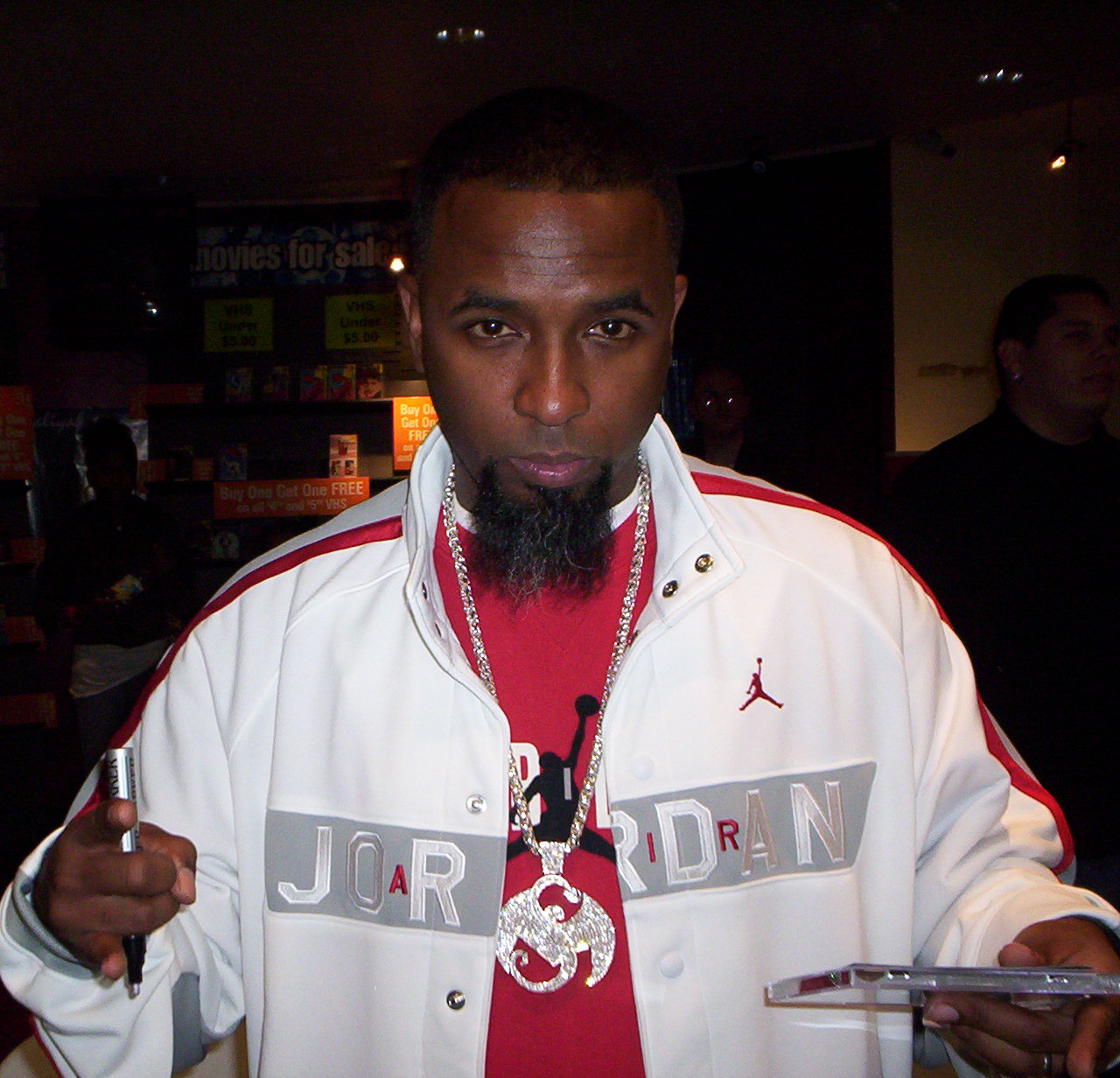
Rapper Tech N9ne makes an appearance on the third single "Rip Your Heart Out".

In an interview with ThisIs50, Hopsin released information on the album, stating that the first single would be named "Hop Madness". Hopsin confirmed via his Facebook and Twitter on January 5, 2012, that he would be shooting the "Hop Madness" video that month. On February 16, 2012, Hopsin stated that the music video would be released within the next month. The video was officially released on March 15, 2012. The song was ultimately excluded from the album.

On July 17, 2013, Hopsin released the music video for "Old Friend" on both his YouTube channel, and the single to iTunes. He later confirmed that the song is not the sixth in the "Ill Mind of Hopsin" series but rather the first single from Knock Madness. On August 18, 2013, Hopsin confirmed in a Facebook status that the lead single from Knock Madness, titled "Hop Is Back", would be released in a couple of weeks. However, the single's release, with its accompanying music video, was delayed until October 22, 2013. "Rip Your Heart Out", featuring Tech N9ne, was released as the album's third single on November 12, 2013. The same day, Hopsin and Tech N9ne filmed the music video for "Rip Your Heart Out". The music video for "I Need Help" was released on April 6, 2014.

== Critical reception ==
Professional ratings
Aggregate scores
Source	Rating
Metacritic	77/100
Review scores
Source	Rating
AllMusic	4/5 stars
DJBooth	3.5/5 stars
Exclaim!	6/10
HipHopDX	3.5/5 stars
XXL	(XL)

Knock Madness received generally positive reviews from music critics. On Metacritic, which assigns a normalized rating out of 100 to reviews from mainstream critics, the album received an average score of 77, based on 5 reviews, which indicates "generally favorable reviews". Omar Burgess of HipHopDX classified the album as "Pop-tinged Horrorcore of the highest order", praising its "catchy hooks, accessible production and subject matter" as well as "Hopsin's raw technical ability" with regards to lyricism and wordplay. In the end Burgess said, "When he [Hopsin] strikes the perfect balance between shock value, raw emotion and his immense skill set, that moment may yield a classic album." Sheldon Pierce of XXL called Knock Madness "a stepping stone album, one that can only produce even better music in the future", and noted that the album did well to "serve as a peek into the wildly entertaining thought process of one of hip-hop's most misunderstood characters."

Jordan Sowunmi of Exclaim! stated that the album excels when Hopsin "focuses on external obsessions: ode to amateur skating 'Nollie Tre Flip' has the most enticingly offbeat rapping on the album, as well as a dizzying internal rhyme scheme, while 'Turn on the Lights' analogue 'Dream Forever' is heartfelt and raw." David Jeffries of AllMusic praised the album's consistency for providing "shocking lyrics and infectious hooks", highlighting 'Rip Your Heart Out' featuring Tech N9ne as a standout track. Dominick Grillo of DJBooth noted that Hopsin's "technical passionate wordplays offer constant comparisons to Eminem", concluding that the album is "a dark, often violent creative response to the pressure now resting on Hopsin's shoulders", conceding that there are moments when Hopsin "weighs himself (and the audience) down with layers upon layers of negativity", though admitting that the album "works best when Hopsin is either angrily fighting or humorously poking fun at some sort of ludicrosity."

== Commercial performance ==
After only being released for three days, Knock Madness debuted at number 132 on the US Billboard 200, selling 4,000 copies in the United States. In its first full week the album rose to number 76 on the Billboard 200, selling 12,000 more copies, bringing its total album sales to 16,000 according to Nielsen SoundScan. The album has sold 58,000 copies in the US as of April 2015.

== Track listing ==
- All songs produced by Hopsin.

No.	Title	Writer(s)	Length
1.	"The Fiends Are Knocking"	Marcus Hopson	5:10
2.	"Hop Is Back"	Marcus Hopson	3:23
3.	"Who's There?" (featuring Jarren Benton and Dizzy Wright)	Marcus Hopson; Jarren Benton; La'Reonte Wright	3:39
4.	"Tears to Snow"	Marcus Hopson	3:49
5.	"Rip Your Heart Out" (featuring Tech N9ne)	Marcus Hopson; Aaron Yates	3:51
6.	"Nollie Tre Flip"	Marcus Hopson	3:31
7.	"Gimmie That Money"	Marcus Hopson, Anthony Smith	4:09
8.	"I Need Help"	Marcus Hopson	4:19
9.	"Hip Hop Sinister"	Marcus Hopson	3:50
10.	"Good Guys Get Left Behind"	Marcus Hopson	5:14
11.	"Bad Manners Freestyle"	Marcus Hopson	2:06
12.	"Ill Mind Six: Old Friend"	Marcus Hopson	4:25
13.	"Still Got Love for You"	Marcus Hopson	4:14
14.	"Jungle Bash" (featuring SwizZz)	Marcus Hopson; Justin Ritter	3:47
15.	"Lunch Time Cypher" (featuring Passionate MC and G-Mo Skee)	Marcus Hopson; Kyle Gobern; Jaron Johnson	5:57
16.	"Dream Forever"	Marcus Hopson	4:09
17.	"What's My Purpose"	Marcus Hopson	5:00
18.	"Caught in the Rain"	Marcus Hopson	3:53
Total length:			1:14:26

== Personnel ==
Album credits adapted from AllMusic.

- Hopsin - executive producer, mixing, primary artist
- Jarren Benton - featured artist
- Passionate MC - featured artist
- G-Mo Skee - featured artist
- SwizZz - featured artist
- Tech N9ne - featured artist
- Dizzy Wright - featured artist
- Connor Tingley - art direction

== Charts ==
=== Weekly charts ===
Chart (2013)	Peak position
UK R&B Albums (Official Charts)	19
UK Independent Albums (Official Charts)	33
US Billboard 200	76
US Heatseekers Albums (Billboard)	1
US Independent Albums (Billboard)	6
US Top R&B/Hip-Hop Albums (Billboard)	13
US Top Rap Albums (Billboard)	7

=== Year-end charts ===
Chart (2014)	Position
US Top R&B/Hip-Hop Albums (Billboard)	81

== Release history ==
Though the album's release date was originally scheduled for November 26, 2013, Funk Volume announced on their Facebook page on November 18 that it would be very hard to find Knock Madness in stores the first week of its release, due to a delay and few stores placing orders for the album. However, instead of pushing back the release date as announced, Funk Volume decided to release the album on its initial date of November 26, for digital download and compact disc format through their website. The album was then released in compact disc format in retail stores on December 3, 2013.

Region	Date	Format	Label
Canada	November 24, 2013	CD; digital download	Funk Volume; Empire Distribution
United Kingdom	November 24, 2013	CD; digital download	Funk Volume; Empire Distribution
United States	November 24, 2013	CD; digital download	Funk Volume; Empire Distribution
