= Sag My Pants =

Single by Hopsin

from the album Raw
- Released: October 8, 2010
- Recorded: 2010
- Genre: Hip hop, comedy hip hop, horrorcore
- Length: 3:39
- Label: Funk Volume
- Songwriter(s): Marcus Hopson
- Producer(s): Hopsin

Hopsin singles chronology
"Nocturnal Rainbows" (2010)	"Sag My Pants" (2010)	"Ill Mind of Hopsin 4" (2011)

Music video
- "Sag My Pants" on YouTube

"Sag My Pants" is a song by American rapper Hopsin. It was released on October 8, 2010, by Funk Volume, as the first single from Hopsin's second studio album, Raw. The song was produced by Hopsin himself and his breakthrough single, propelling him to stardom.

Hopsin raps about subjects ranging from dissing mainstream rappers including Drake, Lil Wayne, Soulja Boy, Lupe Fiasco, and Rick Ross, to discussing his anger towards his situation in the rap game, and dissing his former record label Ruthless Records and owner Tomica Wright.

== Background ==
This song was conceived after the bitter falling out Hopsin had with his former record label Ruthless Records when in its prime was a multi-platinum record label but after the death of Eazy-E the label was in a steady decline. Hopsin and fellow rapper Stevie Stone were a part of the revival of Ruthless however due to the poor promotion of his debut album Gazing at the Moonlight and the lack of financial compensation for the album. This created bitter tension forcing Hopsin to fully invest in his independent label Funk Volume that he had originally conceived when he was 19 years old. Hopsin created a large buzz for Hopsin's second studio album and Funk Volume's debut release at the release of "Sag My Pants" going viral after its release and eventually receiving Gold Certification by the Recording Industry Association of America.

== Music video ==
The song's accompanying music video premiered on October 8, 2010 on Hopsin's account on YouTube. Since its release, the video has received over 50 million views. It was directed by Hopsin himself.

== Legacy ==
The song has received a large positive reception, which helped him receive a XXL Freshman Class 2012 nomination and spring boarded his fanbase to prominence.

== Certifications ==
Region	Certification	Certified units/sales
United States (RIAA)	Gold	500,000^{‡}
^{‡} Sales+streaming figures based on certification alone.
