= Strange Clouds (album) =

Studio album by B.o.B
- Released: May 1, 2012
- Recorded: 2011–2012
- Genres: Alternative hip-hop; pop-rap
- Length: 62:57
- Labels: Grand Hustle; Rebel Rock; Atlantic
- Producers: B.o.B; Jim Jonsin; Dr. Luke; Cirkut; Ryan Tedder; Mynority; Stargate; Frequency; Super Water Sympathy; Billboard, Kutta; Lil' C; Unik; Mike WiLL Made It; P-Nasty; Jamieson Jones; Noel Zancanella; Valentino Khan

B.o.B chronology
B.o.B Presents: The Adventures of Bobby Ray (2010)	Strange Clouds (2012)	Underground Luxury (2013)

Singles from Strange Clouds
- 1. "Strange Clouds" Released: September 27, 2011; 2. "So Good" Released: February 21, 2012; 3. "Both of Us" Released: May 22, 2012; 4. "Out of My Mind" Released: October 8, 2012

Strange Clouds is the second studio album by American rapper B.o.B, released on May 1, 2012, under Grand Hustle Records, Rebel Rock Entertainment, and Atlantic Records. The album features guest appearances from Morgan Freeman, Taylor Swift, Lil Wayne, Chris Brown, T.I., Nicki Minaj, Ryan Tedder, Lauriana Mae, Playboy Tre, Trey Songz, Nelly and Roscoe Dash, while the production was handled by Dr. Luke, Cirkut, Ryan Tedder, Lil' C, Mynority, Stargate, Frequency, Mike WiLL Made It, P-Nasty, Super Water Sympathy, Kutta, Billboard, Jamieson Jones, Jim Jonsin and B.o.B himself.

Four singles were released from the project. The first single, the title track (featuring Lil Wayne), was released on the 27th of September, 2011, and peaked within the top 10 of the Billboard Hot 100. The next two singles, "So Good" and "Both of Us" (featuring Taylor Swift) were also modestly successful, peaking at number 11 and 18 respectively. The fourth single, "Out of My Mind", was the album's final single and features Nicki Minaj. "Where Are You (B.o.B vs. Bobby Ray)" and "So Hard to Breathe" were released as promotional singles for the album, and the single "Play the Guitar" was also released for the album, but was later excluded from the album's track listing. Three other songs, "Arena" (featuring Chris Brown and T.I.), "Ray Bands", and "Castles" (featuring Trey Songz) would also chart.

Upon its release, the album received positive reviews from music critics. It debuted at number 5 on the Billboard 200, witnessing a slight commercial decline from its predecessor, B.o.B Presents: The Adventures of Bobby Ray. It also topped the Top R&B/Hip-Hop Albums and Top Rap Albums charts and peaked within the top 10 on the Billboard Canadian Albums chart. Strange Clouds was also certified platinum by the Recording Industry Association of America (RIAA) for equivalent sales units of 1,000,000 copies in the United States.

== Background ==
B.o.B first spoke of the album, back in May 2011 in an interview with MTV. "I would have to parallel my album coming out to my first one," he told MTV at the South by Southwest music festival. "The first time you record an album is way more exciting than the second time. Not that the second time isn't exciting, it's just ... the initial excitement of finally having that first album." During the interview he stated: "I think that people will definitely be surprised at the music they hear on the second album, I don't think they would expect that coming from me."

On June 9, 2011, B.o.B confirmed he was working on the follow-up album to his debut, B.o.B Presents: The Adventures of Bobby Ray (2010). In a statement given to Detroit's Mlive.com, Bobby Ray said: "I’m really excited about this one. You’re always excited about every project. But I really feel like I’m in my groove with this one. I’m more aware of myself as an instrument, as a sound. It's more intentful." As the Atlanta rapper continued, he spoke on his process of making songs as if he was performing the song live: "I make music just to perform it. A lot of the thought process (of working on an album) goes into actually performing it."

On September 27, 2011, B.o.B appeared on an online video stream on Atlanta's V-103 WVEE radio station, to promote the lead single "Strange Clouds". While there he announced the title of the album to also be Strange Clouds and revealed the album was to be released in early Spring of 2012. Bobby Ray held the first listening session for the album at Tree Sound Studios on October 25, 2011. Seven new songs were previewed during the listening session, including his single "Play the Guitar" which features André 3000. Other guest appearances confirmed, as the album was not fully complete, include Lil Wayne, Big K.R.I.T., Nelly and a song with T.I. titled "Arena". In addition he has worked with OneRepublic on a song and has been quoted as having: "the song of 2012 with a mega feature from somebody who never does features with anyone!".

On November 15, 2011, B.o.B revealed a then-upcoming mixtape titled E.P.I.C. (Every Play Is Crucial) prior to the album's release. The mixtape was released on November 28, 2011, featuring guest appearances from Eminem, Mos Def, Roscoe Dash, Meek Mill, and Bun B, and included production from Ryan Tedder to Lil' C and Jim Jonsin. Two songs off the mixtape, "What Are We Doing" and "Guest List", both appear on the Deluxe Edition as bonus tracks, respectively. The album was originally set to be released on March 13, 2012, however on February 9, B.o.B announced the album had been pushed back, and the new release date was May 1, 2012. On February 21, 2012, the official second single, "So Good", was released to radio and digital download.

B.o.B explained the album title comes from a concept of his: "Strange Clouds is kind of a science-fictiony kind of title, mixed with recreational activities. It's really like a fusion between the hip-hop lifestyle and the people whose thoughts cross into the other realm of thinking, outside of the norm, which may be considered strange or weird, or unique. And, I feel like it's all about hybridizing these two different worlds – on the ground level to the skies. If that makes sense." B.o.B previously promised fans a "different sound" compared to his debut: "I feel like the sound is a continuum from the last album, just more mature, more refined, more conversational at moments. You know, I really bring people closer to who I am, and what makes me think, and … my story, growing up as a kid and just letting people know who I am really. I don’t think people really know enough of who I am. You know, I had a really good year last year, and it happened really fast … I needed to sit down for year. I recorded my album — I spent about 13–14 months on it. I’m ready to really build the connection with my fans."

== Composition ==
=== Recording and production ===
Strange Clouds features B.o.B working with his usual collaborators such as Jim Jonsin and Dr. Luke, the latter of whom produced hit singles "Magic" and "Strange Clouds". In an interview with Rap-Up, Jim Jonsin spoke of his Rebel Rock artist's upcoming album: "We cut four songs and there's two that I really like. One record has like a reggae vibe to it, hip-hop with some reggae. It's pretty big. I think that's a possible single. He's kinda figuring out the direction and I’m hoping to close out with him to do another three or four songs before the album's done", Jonsin told Rap-Up. While his debut may have been jam-packed with features, Jonsin didn't expect too many guests this time around: "I don’t think he's doing as many features. I think most of his singles will be him and he just wants the fans to hear a lot more of him on this album. It's gonna be incredible."

Mack of Sound-Savvy inquired about how he approached this album differently from his previous projects to which B.o.B responded: "I feel like I had to combine the way I approached a mixtape AND an album. With The Adventures of Bobby Ray, it was a very condensed version with only 11–12 tracks. I wanted to be able to show people who fell in love with the album and the people who fell in love with the mixtapes, from Cloud 9 to The Adventures of Bobby Ray, I wanted to make music for those fans." That said, he stressed the importance of remaining true to himself and always use his voice and candor to present his ideas and deliver a message. "My dad always says "Now you wanna show people you know music, but pretty soon you’re gonna wanna show people that you know people. And I feel like this album is more on that tip but it still has even better and more mature musicality."

B.o.B told Rap-Up, that for this album he was taking a more hands-on and honest approach: "I feel like this album is the culmination of my life story. I’m bringing people into my world with just the story and the building blocks that created B.o.B, and I wanted to spend a lot of time with it. It's a lot more centered with a core sound. I was a lot more honest on this album. I feel like I’m continuously honest in the moment to moment, but I’m constantly changing." In the same interview B.o.B claims he did about "60 percent of the production": "When I made this album, I wanted to make sure that I was a part of everything that was made, even from the time a demo was recorded to the time it's mixed," he explained. "I really wanted to be hands-on with the project. You really got to treat it like a child. You gotta nurture it and give it the right amount of attention."

=== Songs and lyrics ===
At the October 25th listening session at Tree Sound Studios, B.o.B played 8 songs from the album for a private audience, then sat down with Mack of Sound-Savvy to talk about the new album. One of the tracks premiered was "Play the Guitar", B.o.B's ode to his instrument of choice. He describes the song as one that expresses his "love for music and love for the guitar". The song features André 3000 (who is notorious for his frequent guest appearances). Of the song, B.o.B says: "I feel like it shows people that we are two different artists and we actually do sound different and have our own styles. Not to say that I wasn’t influenced by Outkast and André, but I feel like it's a ‘pass-the-torch’ type of moment. He really gave me a lot of love on the feature and I'm looking forward to hearing what people have to say about it." The hook for "Play the Guitar" features a sample of T.I.'s verse from Drake's ‘Fancy’. B.o.B. introduced this one with his origins on playing the guitar, which he picked up after urges from his brother. The song, however was left off the album due to its lackluster performance on the charts.

B.o.B also played an incomplete version of "5 on the Kush", that hadn't been mixed or mastered. This track features Big K.R.I.T. and one other undisclosed rapper whose verse wasn't heard. B.o.B described this as a "Good Southern hip hop song…". Mack of Sound-Savvy wrote "It had a very old school sounding, slow beat with a southern thump to it. This one's a banger for the car." The undisclosed rapper was later revealed to be Bun B, once one half of the southern hip hop duo UGK. The song, produced by 2 Much, was released on B.o.B's eighth mixtape, E.P.I.C (Every Play Is Crucial). Mack of Sound-Savvy called "Arenas" featuring T.I. "a real stadium sounding record, inspired by his live performances and his penchant for interacting with his fans in concert." B.o.B said he wanted to make "something for the fans to sing along to at the shows" and Mack agreed saying: "Sure enough, towards the end of the song, one glance around the room told me that his plan had worked: a large part of the audience was mouthing the hook. Catchy and not too complicated."

A song titled "So Hard to Breathe" was played at the listening session, where B.o.B called it a "sibling or sequel to ‘Don't Let Me Fall’". B.o.B produced this one, and wrote the hook along with Sean Garrett. Mack of Sound-Savvy stated "it opened with a solemn acoustic guitar intro and progresses into a soaring electric guitar backing. Lyrically, it has a tone that's both introspective and retrospective of his career thus far and his life before stardom. He informed us that this song is a favorite of both he and his team. I can definitely hear why." In an interview with PopCrush B.o.B claimed his favorite track on the album to be "So Hard to Breathe": "My favorite track on the album is … it's called ‘Hard to Breathe.’ It may have a different name. I'm not sure what I want to call it yet. But now I guess it's [going to be called] ‘Hard to Breathe.’ I could call it ‘Asphyxiation,’ but then it wouldn't be [something] very good." He went on to say: "It would kind of be the answer to ‘Don’t Let Me Fall’". "So Hard to Breathe" was released as the second promotional single on April 17, 2012.

Before playing "MJ", his collab with St. Louis native Nelly, B.o.B reminded the audience that he's "always been the type of artist to say how I feel" and that the album "really shows all sides of me." The song led to him coining his new term for ballin', "MJ-ing": "[The song] is about ballin'. It's like, I feel like ballin’ has grown into a universal term. You know, anybody can say it. You know, a 5-year-old kid enlisted in minor league sports can say, ‘I’m ballin’.’ The CEO of a business down the street getting off of work, making choices in business left and right, getting into his car, he can say, ‘I’m ballin’.’ A college student could crush up the final exam, end up with a 4.0 [GPA], graduate summa cum laude, they could say, ‘I’m ballin’.’ And that's what it's about. It's about ‘MJ’-ing." The song is included in the Target Deluxe Edition as a bonus track.

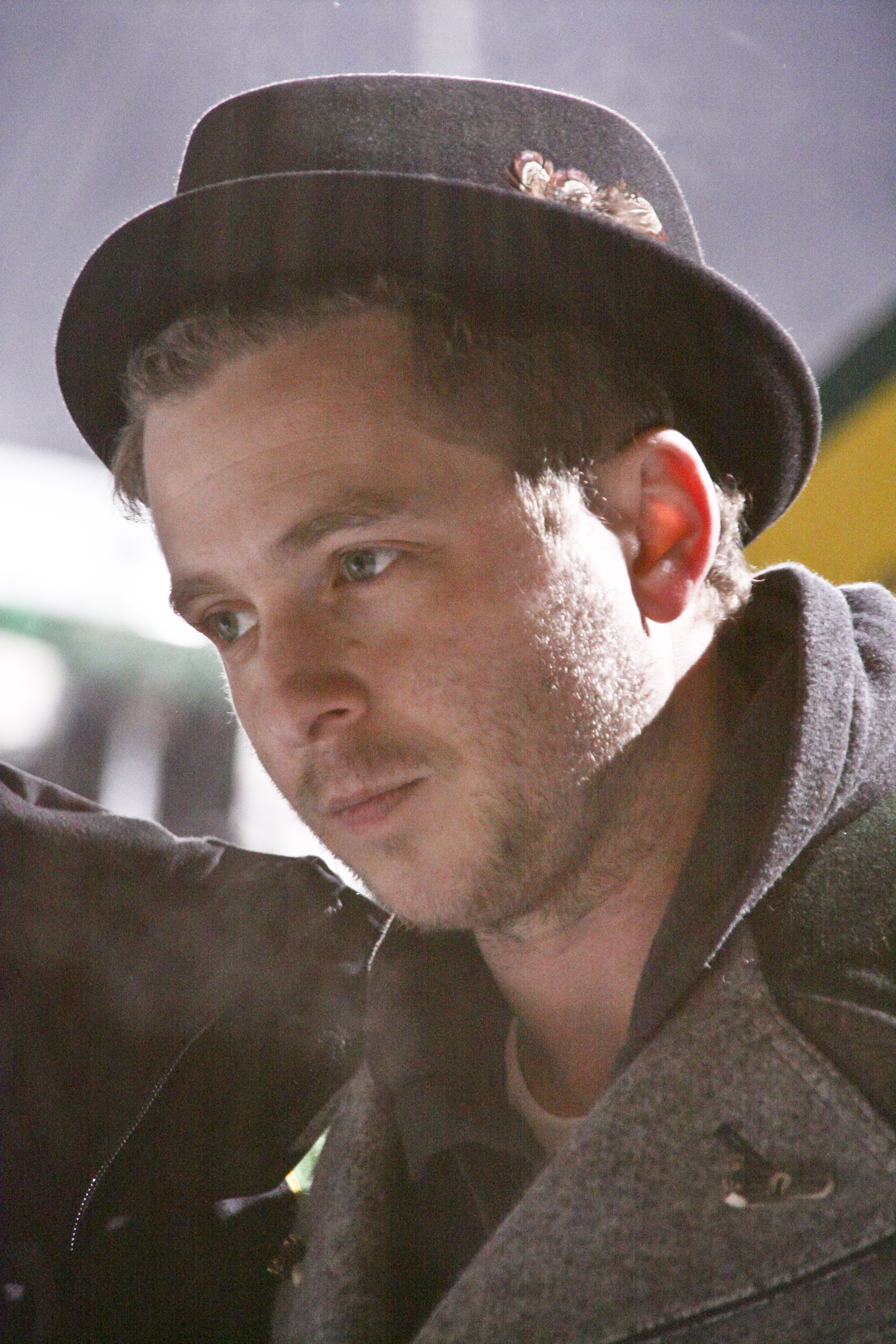
Ryan Tedder of OneRepublic is one of the many features and producers on the album.

Ryan Tedder worked with B.o.B on "So Good", which the rapper describes as a "victory lap song with a big sound that a lot of people will gravitate towards". Mack of Sound-Savvy noted: "In concept and sonically (probably due to Tedder) it reminds me of OneRepublic's current single "Good Life" but has quite a few differences. Not a rip by any means. I could hear it as a feel-good summer single for the pop stations". "So Good" was supposed to be the final song played at the listening session; however, a request from a female in the audience to hear a "record for the ladies" prompted B.o.B to play "Circles". Mack of Sound-Savvy stated: "It wasn't one of the strongest, but it wasn't a dud either. It garnered high praise and applause from the ladies who eagerly let him know they liked it." Record producer and Rebel Rock label boss Jim Jonsin described one song, tentatively titled "Rule the World" that could possibly appear on the album and may be released as a single: "We cut four songs and there's two that I really like. One record has like a reggae vibe to it, hip-hop with some reggae. It's pretty big. I think that's a possible single."

On January 8, 2012, footage of Waka Flocka Flame and B.o.B in the studio recording a song tentatively titled "Fist Pump" was released. It was rumored to be on the album, but B.o.B confirmed on his Twitter account that it will be on Waka Flocka Flame's second effort, Triple F Life: Friends, Fans and Family. On October 8, 2011, American singer-songwriter Taylor Swift brought out B.o.B at her Speak Now World Tour concert at Cowboys Stadium in Dallas, Texas, where they performed "Airplanes". After the performance, speculation of a collaboration between the two began. In March 2012, in an interview with Fuse TV at the SXSW music festival, T.I. confirmed Swift's slot as a featured artist on Strange Clouds. On April 11, 2012, his collaboration with Swift, titled "Both of Us" was leaked.

On March 20, 2012, B.o.B. released the third song from the album, "Where Are You (B.o.B vs. Bobby Ray)". The song is in the same vein as T.I.'s "T.I. vs. T.I.P." from his second studio album Trap Muzik (2003). B.o.B previously touched on the subject of his two alter egos, on his 2009 mixtape B.o.B vs. Bobby Ray. The song's release came just a day after B.o.B's label revealed the cover art for the album.

== Release and promotion ==
The album was originally set to be released on March 13, 2012, however on February 9, B.o.B announced the album had been pushed back, and the new release date was May 1, 2012. The album art, unveiled March 19, shows Bobby Ray in a chic peacoat holding his temples while standing under a hovering cloud. Then, to drum up even more excitement, Warner Music Group premiered the music video for the hit single "So Good" on March 21. On April 20, snippets from the standard edition of the album surfaced showcasing approximately a minute of each of the 15 songs. On April 26, 2012, the standard album was leaked and on his website, a news post and link came and said "The premiere of Strange Clouds" enabling viewers to listen to the standard edition songs.

=== Singles ===
The lead single and title track, "Strange Clouds" was released on iTunes on September 27, 2011. The song features fellow American rapper Lil Wayne and was produced by Dr. Luke and Cirkut. In the first week of the song's release it sold 197,000 digital copies debuting at number 3 on the US Hot Digital Songs. On the week of October 10, 2011, the song debuted at number 7 on the US Billboard Hot 100 making it the "Hot Shot Debut" of the week. "Strange Clouds" marks his best debut sales week for a single, previously held by the 137,000 launch of "Airplanes" on May 1, 2010. As of February 9, 2013, "Strange Clouds" has been certified platinum by the Recording Industry Association of America (RIAA).

"So Good" served as the album's second single and was released on February 21, 2012, the song features production and additional vocals from Ryan Tedder. The song debuted on the US Billboard Hot 100, on the week of March 10, 2012, at number 11, with 164,000 downloads the first week. The song also reached number 7 on the UK Singles Chart, making it his third top 10 single.

"Both of Us" was the album's third single and received first airplay Top 40 Mainstream radio on May 22, 2012. The song features American singer-songwriter Taylor Swift. It debuted on Australia Top 50 singles chart at number 46. The song sold 143,000 copies first week, along with the album release, debuting at number 18 on the Billboard Hot 100 and became the week's top debut. The song has so far been acclaimed by critics especially Swift's part with some calling the country-rap collaboration as a sweet and melodious catchy song.

"Out of My Mind" serve as the album's fourth single. The song was confirmed as the next single via Twitter. The song received generally positive reviews by critics, especially Nicki Minaj's verse. The single's music video was shot in July 2012 in Detroit.

=== Promotional singles ===
"Play the Guitar", features fellow American rapper André 3000 and was produced by Salaam Remi. The song was intended to be the album's second single, but due to its lackluster performance on the charts, it was used for promotional purposes only. "Where Are You (B.o.B vs. Bobby Ray)" was released as the first promotional single on March 20, 2012. "So Hard to Breathe" was released as the second promotional single on April 17, 2012.

=== Other songs ===
"Arena", featuring Chris Brown and T.I., was serviced to Australian radio in late 2012. It entered the Australian ARIA Singles Chart at number 79 on the 17th of December. The song peaked at number 36 and has been certified Gold by the Australian Recording Industry Association (ARIA) for shipments of 35,000 copies. "Ray Bands" and "Castles" (the latter featuring Trey Songz) would also chart, the former charting at number 93 on the Hot R&B/Hip-Hop Songs chart and number 55 on the ARIA Charts respectively.

== Reception ==
Professional ratings
Aggregate scores
Source	Rating
Metacritic	68/100
Review scores
Source	Rating
AllMusic	3.5/5 stars
Consequence	C+
Entertainment Weekly	A−
HipHopDX	2.5/5 stars
NME	3/10
PopMatters	5/10
RapReviews	7.5/10
Rolling Stone	3/5 stars
Spin	8/10
XXL	(XL)

According to the review aggregator Metacritic, Strange Clouds received "generally favorable reviews" based on a weighted average score of 68 out of 100 from 16 critic scores. In its first week, Strange Clouds sold 76,000 copies in the United States, debuted at number 5 on Billboard 200. It also debuted at number 1 on Billboard Top R&B/Hip-Hop Albums and Top Rap Albums. As of November 2013, it has sold 297,000 copies in the United States.

== Track listing ==
No.	Title	Writer(s)	Producer(s)	Length
1.	"Bombs Away" (featuring Morgan Freeman)	Bobby Ray Simmons, Jr.	B.o.B	5:28
2.	"Ray Bands"	Simmons, Jr.; Jamieson Jones	B.o.B; Jamieson Jones	3:48
3.	"So Hard to Breathe"	Simmons, Jr.; Sean Garrett; DeLarry Sanders; Takehiko Kato; Kyle King	B.o.B.	4:21
4.	"Both of Us" (featuring Taylor Swift)	Simmons, Jr.; Swift; Jones; Ammar Malik; Łukasz Gottwald; Henry Walter	Dr. Luke; Cirkut	3:36
5.	"Strange Clouds" (featuring Lil Wayne)	Simmons; Jr., Jones; Dwayne Carter, Jr.; Gottwald; Walter	Dr. Luke; Cirkut	3:47
6.	"So Good"	Brent Kutzle; Simmons, Jr.; Ryan Tedder	Tedder	3:33
7.	"Play for Keeps"	Valentino Khan; Simmons, Jr.	Valentino Khan	3:22
8.	"Arena" (featuring Chris Brown and T.I.)	Simmons, Jr.; Clifford Harris, Jr.; Walter, Gottwald; Christopher Brown	Dr. Luke; Cirkut	4:27
9.	"Out of My Mind" (featuring Nicki Minaj)	Simmons, Jr.; Jeremy Dussolliet; Justin Franks, Alexander Grant, Stephen Hill; Mathieu Jomphe; Jones; Clarence Montgomery III; Onika Maraj; Tim Sommers; Gottwald	Dr. Luke; Billboard	3:43
10.	"Never Let You Go" (featuring Ryan Tedder)	Simmons, Jr.; Tedder; Noel Zancanella	Tedder; Zancanella	4:20
11.	"Chandelier" (featuring Lauriana Mae)	Simmons, Jr.; Catherine Hughes; Robert Hargrove; Bryan Fryzel	Frequency; Super Water Sympathy	4:00
12.	"Circles"	Simmons, Jr.; José López; Jasmine Pratt; Montgomery III	Mynority; B.o.B	3:47
13.	"Just a Sign" (featuring Playboy Tre)	Simmons, Jr.; Montgomery III; Pierre Slaughter; Michael Williams	Mike WiLL Made It; P-Nasty	5:58
14.	"Castles" (featuring Trey Songz)	Simmons, Jr.; Tedder; Zancanella; Tremaine Neverson	Tedder; Zancanella; T.I.	3:54
15.	"Where Are You (B.o.B vs. Bobby Ray)"	Simmons, Jr.	B.o.B.	4:51
Total length:				62:57

Target deluxe edition bonus tracks
No.	Title	Writer(s)	Producer(s)	Length
16.	"MJ" (featuring Nelly)	Simmons, Jr., Cornell Haynes, Jr., Nikolaos Giannulidis, Cordale Quinn	Unik, Lil C	4:04
17.	"Back It Up for Bobby"	Simmons, Jr.	AD, B.o.B	4:04
18.	"What Are We Doing"	Simmons, Jr., James Scheffer, Frank Romano, Daniel Morris	B.o.B, Jim Jonsin	3:27
19.	"Guest List" (featuring Roscoe Dash)	Simmons, Jr., Jeffery Johnson, Jr.	B.o.B, Kutta	3:46
20.	"Ms. Professional"	Simmons, Jr., Montgomery III, Mikkel Eriksen, Tor Hermansen	Stargate	4:42
Total length:				73:00

Notes

- "Out of My Mind" contains a sample of "Airplanes", as performed by B.o.B and American singer Hayley Williams.
- "Back It Up for Bobby" contains a sample of "Supercalifragilisticexpialidocious" by Julie Andrews and Dick Van Dyke.

== Personnel ==
Credits for Strange Clouds adapted from Allmusic.

- Billboard – instrumentation, producer, programming
- B.o.B – executive producer, guitar, guitar (acoustic), instrumentation, piano, producer, programming, soloist, vocals
- Delbert Bowers – assistant
- Smith Carlson – engineer
- Elliot Carter – engineer
- Ariel Chobaz – engineer
- Cirkut – instrumentation, producer, programming
- Joseph Cultice – photography
- Dr. Luke – instrumentation, producer, programming
- Jeremy Dussolliet – composer
- Dwayne Carter – composer
- Nikolaos "Unik" Giannulidis – instrumentation, composer, producer, programming, vocals
- John Sabbas – guitar, instrumentation
- Ben Didelot – bass guitar
- Joe Fitz – mixing
- Justin Franks – composer
- Frequency – engineer, producer
- Julie Frost – vocals
- Brian "DJ Frequency" Fryzel – composer
- Chris Galland – assistant
- Sean Garrett – composer
- Chris Gehringer – mastering
- Serban Ghenea – mixing
- Clint Gibbs – assistant, engineer
- Lukasz Gottwald – composer, vocals
- Alexander Grant – composer
- John Hanes – engineer, mixing
- Robert Clyde Hargrove – composer
- Clifford Harris, Jr. – composer
- Stephen Joshua Hill – composer
- Bradley Horne – engineer
- Ghazi Hourani – assistant
- Catherine Ansley Hughes – composer
- Jamie Hyder – vocals
- Ava James – assistant
- Mathieu Jomphe – composer
- Jamieson Xavier Jones – composer, instrumentation, producer, programming
- Jim Jonsin – executive producer
- Kato – bass guitar
- Takehiko Kato – composer
- Valentino Khan – composer, producer
- Kyle King – composer
- Alex Kirzhner – art direction, design
- Kool Kojak – vocals
- Brent Kutzle – composer, piano
- Jose Aguirre Lopez (Mynority)– composer
- Ammar Malik – composer, instrumentation, programming
- Manny Marroquin – mixing
- Ian Mercel – engineer
- Corey Miller – engineer
- Katie Mitzell – coordination, production coordination
- Clarence Montgomery III – composer
- Mynority – producer
- Doug Peterson – associate producer
- Michelle Piza – package manager
- Sab-Bion Portloc – vocals
- Jasmine Pratt – composer, vocals
- Irene Richter – coordination, production coordination
- Delarry D.Fi Sanders – composer, drums
- Miguel Scott – assistant
- Phil Seaford – assistant, assistant engineer, engineer, mixing
- Jon Sher – assistant
- Bobby Ray Simmons Jr. – composer, engineer
- Pierre Ramon Slaughter – composer
- Tim Sommers – composer
- Taylor Swift – vocals, songwriter
- T.I. – executive producer
- Ryan Tedder – composer, guitar (acoustic), instrumentation, producer, programming, vocals (background)
- Ilya Toshinsky – banjo, guitar (acoustic)
- Trey Songz – vocals
- Henry Walter – composer, vocals
- Michael L. Williams II – composer
- Noel Zancanella – composer, instrumentation, producer, programming

== Charts ==
=== Weekly charts ===
Chart (2012–2016)	Peak position
Canadian Albums (Billboard)	7
UK Albums (Official Charts)	30
UK R&B Albums (Official Charts)	1
US Billboard 200	5
US Top R&B/Hip-Hop Albums (Billboard)	1
US Top Rap Albums (Billboard)	1

=== Year-end charts ===
Chart (2012)	Position
US Billboard 200	118
US Top R&B/Hip-Hop Albums (Billboard )	24

== Certifications and sales ==
Region	Certification	Certified units/sales
United States (RIAA)	Platinum	1,000,000^{‡}
^{‡} Sales+streaming figures based on certification alone.

== Release history ==
Region	Date	Format(s)	Label
United States	May 1, 2012	CD, digital download	Grand Hustle, Rebel Rock, Atlantic
United Kingdom	May 7, 2012	CD, digital download	Atlantic
Hungary	May 21, 2012	Digital download	Atlantic
