= Hop Is Back =

Single by Hopsin

from the album Knock Madness
- Released: October 22, 2013
- Recorded: 2013
- Genre: Hip hop
- Length: 3:23
- Label: Funk Volume
- Songwriter(s): Marcus Hopson
- Producer(s): Hopsin

Hopsin singles chronology
"Ill Mind Six: Old Friend" (2013)	"Hop Is Back" (2013)	"Rip Your Heart Out" (2013)

"Hop Is Back" is a song by American hip hop recording artist, Hopsin. The song was released on October 22, 2013 as the lead single from Hopsin's third studio album, Knock Madness. It received mainly positive reviews from music critics and is considered one of the best songs off Knock Madness.

== Background ==
"Hop Is Back" is a dark hip hop song, which brings Hopsin back to his roots. In the song Hopsin pokes fun at Kendrick Lamar's height, Lil Wayne's dreadlocks and disses Kanye West's sixth studio album Yeezus (2013). Hopsin clarified his statements in an interview with HipHopDX saying he had no ill feelings towards Kendrick Lamar, and that he dissed West due to him really not liking his new music.

== Release and promotion ==
On August 18, 2013 Hopsin confirmed in a Facebook status that the lead single off Knock Madness, titled "Hop is Back" would be released in a couple of weeks. However, it was delayed until October 2013. However, the song was delayed with Hopsin later confirming its release in late October 2013 in an interview with AllHipHop. On October 22, 2013, "Hop Is Back", along with its music video was released via YouTube. The single was also released via iTunes the same day.

== Charts ==
Chart (2013)	Peak position
US Billboard Rap Digital Songs	41
