= Strange Clouds (song) =

Single by B.o.B featuring Lil Wayne

from the album E.P.I.C. (Every Play Is Crucial) and Strange Clouds
- Released: September 27, 2011
- Recorded: 2011
- Genre: Hip hop; dubstep
- Length: 3:46
- Label: Grand Hustle; Atlantic
- Songwriters: Bobby Ray Simmons Jr.; Dwayne Carter Jr.; Lukasz Gottwald; Henry Walter
- Producers: Dr. Luke; Cirkut

B.o.B singles chronology
"We Don't Get Down Like Y'all" (2011)	"Strange Clouds" (2011)	"The One That Got Away" (2011)

Lil Wayne singles chronology
"Mirror" (2011)	"Strange Clouds" (2011)	"Weekend (Wicked Wow)" (2011)

Music video
- "Strange Clouds" on YouTube

"Strange Clouds" is a song by American rapper B.o.B featuring fellow American rapper Lil Wayne. Produced by Dr. Luke and Cirkut, the song was announced by Atlantic Records to be released on iTunes on September 27, 2011, Wayne's 29th birthday. The song serves as the lead single from B.o.B's second studio album of the same name. In its first week, it sold 197,000 digital copies, debuting at number seven on the Billboard Hot 100. The song has sold over 1.3 million digital copies worldwide.

== Background ==
Before the song's release B.o.B. performed the song at concert on three occasions. He debuted the song at Colorado in late August 2011, then performed the track again in Syracuse, New York on September 13, 2011, and on September 20, 2011, at Tennessee Tech University. On September 23, 2011, B.o.B released a trailer through his official website, depicting him in the studio playing the song. The song was written by Bobby Ray Simmons Jr., Dwayne Carter, Lukasz Gottwald and Henry Walter and was produced by Dr. Luke and Cirkut. It contains elements of dubstep and electro-hop. The official cover art for the single was released on September 26, 2011, on B.o.B's official website. The cover depicts an open grassy landscape on the bottom portion of the cover and a large open sky with a central mystical entity that resembles a nebula centered in the sky above. B.o.B included the song on his eighth mixtape, E.P.I.C (Every Play Is Crucial).

== Music video ==
The song's official music video premiered on B.o.B's YouTube channel in December 2011. The video features both rappers performing the song in a grassy forested area, as various people look in trepidation at the sight of massive "strange clouds" forming in the sky. Grand Hustle Records label boss T.I. makes a cameo appearance, along with rapper 2 Chainz.

== Critical reception ==
Caryn Ganz of Rolling Stone gave the song three out of five stars, saying that "Wayne drops a wink-nudge verse about getting blitzed, but it's B.o.B who lights up with a charming, tenacious flow."

== Remix ==
The official remix to "Strange Clouds" was released 12 January 2012 and features fellow Atlanta rappers T.I. and Young Jeezy. The remix maintains the original production from Dr. Luke, however B.o.B performs a new verse and a slightly modified chorus.

It was mentioned on February 6, 2012, by American rapper Tech N9ne through his official blog and a tweet reply to a fan on his Twitter account, that he was originally included in the remix. It was later confirmed on April 5, 2012, by B.o.B through a tweet reply to a fan on his Twitter account.

=== Remix video ===
The official music video for the remix to "Strange Clouds" was released on February 1, 2012. The video, directed by 1st Impressions, premiered on B.o.B's YouTube page on January 31, 2012.

== Chart performance ==
On the week of October 10, 2011 the song debuted at number seven on the U.S. Billboard Hot 100 making it the "Hot Shot Debut" of the week. In the first week of the song's release it sold 197,000 digital copies debuting at number three on the U.S. Hot Digital Songs. "Strange Clouds" marks B.O.B's best debut sales week for a single, previously held by the 137,000 launch of "Airplanes" on May 1, 2010. As of February 9, 2012, "Strange Clouds" has been certified 2× platinum by the RIAA.

== Charts and certifications ==
=== Weekly charts ===
Chart (2011–12)	Peak position
Australia (ARIA)	69
Canada (Canadian Hot 100)	26
New Zealand (Recorded Music NZ)	39
Switzerland (Schweizer Hitparade)	47
UK Singles (OCC)	72
US Billboard Hot 100	7
US Hot R&B/Hip-Hop Songs (Billboard)	43
US Hot Rap Songs (Billboard)	16
US Rhythmic Airplay (Billboard)	16

== Certifications ==
Region	Certification	Certified units/sales
Canada (Music Canada)	Gold	40,000^{*}
United States (RIAA)	2× Platinum	2,000,000^{‡}
^{*} Sales figures based on certification alone.^{‡} Sales+streaming figures based on certification alone.

== Release history ==
Country	Date	Format	Label	Ref.
United States	September 27, 2011	Digital download	Atlantic Records	
