= Snow Tha Product discography =

Discography of Mexican-American rapper Snow Tha Product

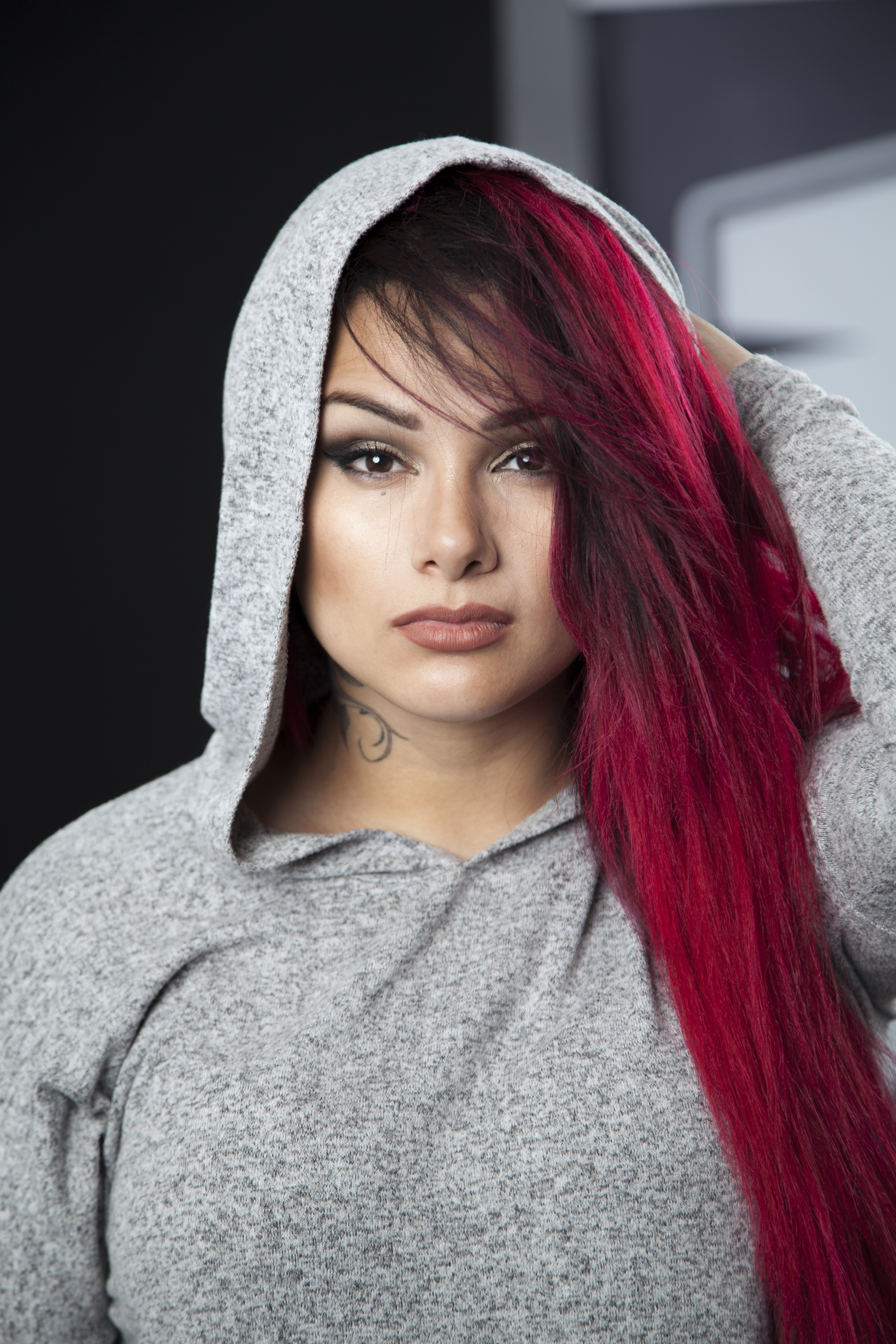
- Snow Tha Product at the VMAs, 2016
- Studio albums: 3+
- EPs: 4+
- Compilation albums: 5
- Singles: 130+
- Mixtapes: 9±

The discography of Snow Tha Product, a Mexican-American rapper, singer and songwriter, consists of at least three studio albums, four or more extended plays, five compilation albums, nine or more mixtapes, and over 130 singles (including 51+ as a featured artist).

Snow's body of work showcases a versatile artistic range where she fuses varying degrees of traditional Mexican styles like Mariachi and Cumbia with other contemporary Estadunidense/Latin genres such as Hip-hop, R&B, Trap, and Latin urban.

Lyrically, her songs address significant socio-political topics, personal autonomy, navigating life as a self-identified queer and neurodivergent woman, and her experiences contending with the commercial music industry prior to going independent.

== Studio albums ==
List of studio albums
Title	Album details
Unorthodox	Released: October 26, 2011; Label: Street Science Entertainment, Product ENT.; Formats: CD, digital download
To Anywhere	Released: October 21, 2022; Label: Product ENT.; Formats: CD, digital download, streaming
Before I Crashout	Released: December 12, 2025; Label: Snow Tha Product (Independent); Formats: CD, digital download, streaming

== Extended plays ==
List of extended plays
Title	EP details
M.a.M.A	Released: September 3, 2025; Label: Snow Tha Product, Product Ent.; Formats: Digital download, streaming
Choices	Released: September 17, 2025; Label: Snow Tha Product, Product Ent.; Formats: Digital download, streaming
Sabado (Hard Techno Remix)	Released: September 24, 2025; Label: Snow Tha Product, Product Ent.; Formats: Digital download, streaming

== Compilation albums ==
List of compilation albums
Title	Album details
Verbal Assault, Vol. 1	Released: August 16, 2007; Label: Product Ent.; Formats: Digital download
Future of tha Westcoast Vol. 1	Released: 2008; Label: Product Ent.; Formats: Digital download
Future of tha Westcoast Vol. 2	Released: 2009; Label: Product Ent.; Formats: Digital download
Verbal Assault, Vol. 2	Released: July 31, 2009; Label: Product Ent.; Formats: Digital download
Vibe Higher	Released: December 21, 2018; Label: Product Ent.; Formats: Digital download, streaming

== Commercial mixtapes ==
List of commercial mixtapes / extended plays, with selected chart positions
Title	Mixtape details	Peak chart positions	
Title	Mixtape details	US Heat	US Rap
Half Way There... Pt. 1	Released: June 17, 2016 (US); Label: Atlantic Records; Formats: Digital download	9	13
Snow Wite	Released: 2016; Label: Atlantic Records; Formats: Digital download, streaming		

== Independent Mixtapes ==
List of mixtapes
Title	Mixtape details
Raising the Bar	Released: 2008; Label: Product ENT.; Formats: Digital download
Run Up or Shut Up	Released: March 23, 2010; Label: Product ENT.; Formats: Digital download
Wake Ya Game Up, Vol. 1	Released: November 19, 2010; Label: Product ENT.; Formats: Digital download
Good Nights & Bad Mornings	Released: December 12, 2012; Label: Product ENT.; Formats: Digital download
Good Nights & Bad Mornings 2: The Hangover	Released: October 14, 2013; Label: Product ENT.; Formats: Digital download
The Rest Comes Later	Released: June 30, 2015; Label: Product ENT.; Formats: Digital download
Next Time Believe Me	Released: November 6, 2026; Label: Snow Tha Product, distributed by Universal Music Latino; Formats: CD, digital download, streaming

== Singles ==
=== As lead artist ===
List of singles as lead artist, with selected chart positions, showing year released and album name
Title	Year	Peak chart positions						Certifications	Album		
Title	Year	US Latin Pop	US Reg. Mex.	ARG	MEX Pop	SPA	WW Excl. US	Certifications	Album		
"Drunk Love"	2011	—	—	—	—	—	—		Unorthodox		
"Holy Shit"	2011	—	—	—	—	—	—		Unorthodox		
"Play"	2013	—	—	—	—	—	—		Good Nights & Bad Mornings 2: The Hangover		
"Doing Fine"	2014	—	—	—	—	—	—		Good Nights & Bad Mornings 2: The Hangover		
"Hola"	2014	—	—	—	—	—	—		Good Nights & Bad Mornings 2: The Hangover		
"Nights" (featuring W. Darling)	2016	—	—	—	—	—	—		Half Way There... Pt. 1		
"Get Down Low" (featuring Ohana Bam)	2016	—	—	—	—	—	—		Half Way There... Pt. 1		
"Waste of Time"	2017	—	—	—	—	—	—		Non-album single		
"Nuestra Canción" (featuring Arcángel)	2017	—	—	—	—	—	—		Half Way There... Pt. 1		
"I Don't Wanna Leave (Remix)" (featuring Tdot Illdude and Charlie Heat)	2017	—	—	—	—	—	—		Non-album singles		
"Nuestra Canción Pt. 2" (featuring Arcángel)	2017	30	—	—	37	—	—		Non-album singles		
"NoMore" (featuring Lex The Great)	2017	—	—	—	—	—	—		Non-album singles		
"Help a Bitch Out" (featuring O.T. Genasis)	2018	—	—	—	—	—	—		Non-album singles		
"Myself" (featuring DRAM)	2018	—	—	—	—	—	—		Non-album singles		
"Today I Decided"	2018	—	—	—	—	—	—		Non-album singles		
"Goin' Off"	2018	—	—	—	—	—	—				
"AyAyAy!"	2018	—	—	—	—	—	—		Snow Wite		
"Uhh"	2018	—	—	—	—	—	—		Snow Wite		
"Snooze"	2018	—	—	—	—	—	—		Snow Wite		
"Dale Gas" (featuring Alemán)	2018	—	—	—	—	—	—		Non-album single		
"Bet That I Will"	2019	—	—	—	—	—	—		Snow Wite		
"Gettin' It"	2019	—	—	—	—	—	—		Snow Wite		
"Gaslight"	2019	—	—	—	—	—	—		Non-album singles		
"Bilingue"	2019	—	—	—	—	—	—		Non-album singles		
"Say Bitch"	2019	—	—	—	—	—	—		Non-album singles		
"Butter"	2019	—	—	—	—	—	—		Non-album singles		
"Petty"	2019	—	—	—	—	—	—		Non-album singles		
"On My Way!" (featuring Daddie Juju)	2019	—	—	—	—	—	—		Non-album singles		
"Child Support"	2019	—	—	—	—	—	—		Non-album singles		
"Perico"	2020	—	—	—	—	—	—		Non-album singles		
"Madluv"	2020	—	—	—	—	—	—		Non-album singles		
"How I Do It"	2020	—	—	—	—	—	—		Non-album singles		
"Nowhere to Go (Quarantine Love)"	2020	—	—	—	—	—	—		Non-album singles		
"Pressure"	2020	—	—	—	—	—	—		Non-album singles		
"On My Shit (Freestyle)"	2020	—	—	—	—	—	—		Non-album singles		
"Really Counts"	2020	—	—	—	—	—	—		Non-album singles		
"Confleis (No Soy Santa)"	2020	—	—	—	—	—	—		Non-album singles		
"No Really, Im Good"	2020	—	—	—	—	—	—		Non-album singles		
"Tell You Like This"	2020	—	—	—	—	—	—		Non-album singles		
"Shot Witcha" (with AJ Hernz)	2020	—	—	—	—	—	—		Non-album singles		
"Shuttup"	2021	—	—	—	—	—	—		Non-album singles		
"Snow Tha Product: Bzrp Music Sessions, Vol. 39" (with Bizarrap)	2021	—	—	20	—	15	147	RIAA: Platinum (Latin)	Non-album singles		
"Get Money" (with C.R.O)	2021	—	—	—	—	—	—		Non-album singles		
"Te Va a Gustar" (with Alemán)	2021	—	—	—	—	—	—		Non-album singles		
"Esto No Ha Terminado (This Isn't Over)" (with The Newton Brothers)	2021	—	—	—	—	—	—		Non-album singles	The Forever Purge (Soundtrack)	
"Que Le Gusta el Flow" (with Jon Z)	2021	—	—	—	—	—	—		Non-album singles	Non-album singles	
"Qué Oso"	2021	—	—	—	—	—	—		Non-album singles	Non-album singles	
"Breakup Body" (with James Elizabeth)	2021	—	—	—	—	—	—		Non-album singles	Non-album singles	
"Capítulo 5"	2021	—	—	—	—	—	—		Non-album singles	Non-album singles	
"Never Be Me"	2021	—	—	—	—	—	—		Non-album singles	Non-album singles	
"Party Trippy" (with DJ Maff and Akapellah featuring Totoy El Frio)	2021	—	—	—	—	—	—		Non-album singles	Non-album singles	
"Wassap" (with Gera MX)	2022	—	—	—	—	—	—		Non-album singles	Non-album singles	
"Nieve" (with Haraca Kiko)	2022	—	—	—	—	—	—		Non-album singles	Non-album singles	
"Down" (with AJ Hernz)	2022	—	—	—	—	—	—		Non-album singles	Non-album singles	
"Elevator" (with AJ Hernz)	2022	—	—	—	—	—	—		Non-album singles	Non-album singles	
"Uh Huh"	2022	—	—	—	—	—	—		Non-album singles	Non-album singles	To Anywhere
"Piña" (featuring Lauren Jauregui)	2022	—	—	—	—	—	—		Non-album singles		To Anywhere
"Balance" (with AJ Hernz)	2022	—	—	—	—	—	—		Non-album singles		
"Talk Back" (with AJ Hernz and Jandro)	2022	—	—	—	—	—	—		Non-album singles		
"Que Vamo Hacer" (with Brray and Dayme y El High featuring Totoy El Frio)	2022	—	—	—	—	—	—		Non-album singles		
"Sola" (featuring Ceky Vicini)	2022	—	—	—	—	—	—		To Anywhere		
"Not Today" (featuring Juicy J)	2022	—	—	—	—	—	—		To Anywhere		
"For Real" (featuring AJ Hernz)	2022	—	—	—	—	—	—		To Anywhere		
"De Muestro" (featuring Rotimi)	2022	—	—	—	—	—	—		To Anywhere		
"Cash Cash" (featuring vf7)	2022	—	—	—	—	—	—		To Anywhere		
"Bájala" (featuring Santa Fe Klan)	2022	—	—	—	—	—	—		To Anywhere		
"3x4" (featuring Santa Fe Klan)	2023	—	—	—	—	—	—		Non-album singles		
"Been That"	2023	—	—	—	—	—	—		Non-album singles		
"Gimme Time" (with Vibe Higher and Castro Escobar)	2023	—	—	—	—	—	—		Vibe Higher		
"Química"	2024	—	—	—	—	—	—		Non-album singles		
"Find My Love" (with Zhavia)	2024	—	—	—	—	—	—		Non-album singles		
"So What"	2024	—	—	—	—	—	—		Non-album singles		
"Nah"	2024	—	—	—	—	—	—		Non-album singles		
"Look at Me"	2024	—	—	—	—	—	—		Non-album singles		
"Drunk Love" (2024 version)	2024	—	—	—	—	—	—		Non-album singles		
"Jump"	2024	—	—	—	—	—	—		Non-album singles		
"Te Dejo Ganar"	2024	—	—	—	—	—	—		Non-album singles		
"El Llorón"	2024	—	—	—	—	—	—		Non-album singles		
"Hopeful"	2024	—	—	—	—	—	—		Non-album singles		
"Bless Your Heart (Fake Christians)"	2024	—	—	—	—	—	—		Non-album singles		
"Always Somethin" (with Toni Romiti)	2025	—	—	—	—	—	—		Non-album singles		
"M.a.M.A"	2025	—	—	—	—	—	—		M.a.M.A, Choices, and Before I Crashout		
"Mad at Me Again"	2025	—	—	—	—	—	—		M.a.M.A, Choices, and Before I Crashout		
"No Traigo Nada"	2025	—	—	—	—	—	—		M.a.M.A, Choices, and Before I Crashout		
"Alligator"	2025	—	—	—	—	—	—		M.a.M.A, Choices, and Before I Crashout		
"Sábado"	2025	—	23	—	—	—	—		M.a.M.A, Choices, and Before I Crashout		
"Choices"	2025	—	—	—	—	—	—		Choices and Before I Crashout		
"—" denotes a recording that did not chart or was not released in that territory.

=== As featured artist ===
List of singles as a featured or collaborative artist, showing year released and album name
Title	Year	Other artist(s)	Album	
"Got These Hataz Mad"	2012	Throwed Off Mex	Road to Success	
"Riding in My Chevy"	2013	Fr33, Randy G, Versy	Non-album single	
"So Dope (They Wanna)"	2013	Tech N9ne, Twisted Insane, Wrekonize	Something Else	
"Makin' Papers"	2013	Chuckie, Lupe Fiasco, Too $hort	Non-album singles	
"FCK"	2013	Gary Caos, Pitbull	Non-album singles	
"Put Ya Blockz Up (Remix)"	2013	Kris Stylez, The Presidentz, Rob G, Oran Jones Jr., Troublesum	Non-album singles	
"Stupid A B"	2013	DJ Paul, Lord Infamous	Non-album singles	
"Day Dreaming"	2014	Danielgotskillz, Tum Tum, GT Garza	Non-album singles	
"We the Future"	2014	3fifty7, Klassic, Stunta, Dat Boi T	Non-album singles	
"Money In My Pocket"	2014	Mr. Kee	Non-album singles	
"Future"	2015	Danielgotskillz	Non-album singles	
"Champagne Overdose"	2015	Marty Junior, Baeza	Non-album singles	
"Foreign"	2016	Berner, Sage the Gemini, Keak da Sneak	Non-album singles	
"Tha Shit"	2016	$peedy Noriega	Non-album singles	
"Racing"	2016	Dorrough Music	Non-album singles	
"Immigrants (We Get the Job Done)"	2016	K'naan, Riz MC, Residente	Non-album singles	The Hamilton Mixtape
"Next Shit"	2017	Mav, Brian Staks, Train City	Non-album singles	Non-album singles
"Be Like"	2017	Hitta Castro, Hard Hitta	Non-album singles	Non-album singles
"Find a Way"	2017	Wolfgang Gartner		Non-album singles
"Over Now"	2019	James Elizabeth		Non-album singles
"Airplanes"	2019	G-U, Neema, Anthony Danza		Non-album singles
"Naughty Girl"	2020	Denise Rosenthal		Non-album singles
"Villain"	2020	Jahni Denver, Scarface		Non-album singles
"Moonwalk"	2020	AJ Hernz, CNG		Non-album singles
"Diamond Dance"	2020	AJ Hernz		Non-album singles
"Waterfall"	2020	AJ Hernz		Non-album singles
"La Movida"	2020	Play-N-Skillz, Messiah		Non-album singles
"I Said What I Said"	2021	Drumma Boy, Ludacris		
"No See Umz"	2021	Tech N9ne, Russ	Asin9ne	
"Until the Day (Remix)"	2021	Alexcis, T-Pain	Non-album singles	
"Aquí Seguimos"	2021	Yubeili, Eix	Non-album singles	
"A 120"	2021	Rich Vagos, Gera MX, OPYI, Neutro Shorty	Non-album singles	
"Joder"	2022	Kenia Os	Non-album singles	
"Warfare"	2022	Merkules, Tech N9ne	Non-album singles	
"Ultimate"	2022	Steve Aoki, Santa Fe Klan	Hiroquest: Genesis	
"Soy"	2022	Martin Producer, Bizarrap	Non-album singles	
"Texas to Cali"	2022	Peso Peso, Fenix Flexin	Non-album singles	
"Polvo Rosa"	2023	Cricket, Santa Fe Klan, Yng Lvcas	Non-album singles	
"One Margarita (Margarita Song) [Snow's Bilingual Remix]"	2023	That Chick Angel, Steve Terrell, Casa Di	Non-album singles	
"Miénteme"	2023	Gera MX, Villax	Non-album singles	
"Bye Vibes"	2023	Samantha Barrón	Non-album singles	
"Al Chile"	2023	Imanbek, Sangre X Sangre	Non-album singles	
"Creo Que Me Enamore !"	2023	Jay Roxxx	Non-album singles	
"Ni Muerta"	2023	Chiquis	Non-album singles	
"Flotando"	2022	Día de los Muertos (In Hell) Podcast Soundtrack	Non-album singles	
"ZOD (I Win I Always Win)"	2024	Tech N9ne, Kevin Gates, Joey Cool	Non-album singles	COSM
"Stuck"	2024	NYX Professional Makeup	Non-album singles	
"Modo Antidepresivo"	2024	Yeri Mua	Non-album singles	
"Am I Blurry?"	2024	LaRussell, ClayDough	Non-album singles	
"Fotitos Polarizadas"	2024	Luno, Kevin AMF, FLVCKKA	Non-album singles	
"Dumb Boy (Ojo de Loca)"	2024	ALMAS, Nxnni	Non-album singles	
"¡Basta Ya! (Snow Tha Product Remix)"	2025	Cain Culto, Xiuhtezcatl	Non-album singles	
"Frijolero"	2025	Somos Frijoleros, Belinda	Non-album singles	
"Cambias Mi Mundo"	2025	Lila Downs	Non-album singles	

== Music videos ==
=== As lead artist ===
Year	Song	Album
2011	"Woke Wednesday"	Unorthodox
2011	"Drunk Love"	Unorthodox
2011	"Holy Shit"	Unorthodox
2011	"Til Death"	Unorthodox
2011	"Day Dreaming" (featuring Danielgotskillz, Tum Tum and Gt Garza)	Non-album single
2012	"Cookie Cutter Bitches"	Good Nights & Bad Mornings
2012	"Damn It"	Good Nights & Bad Mornings
2012	"Lord Be With You"	Good Nights & Bad Mornings
2013	"Hola"	Good Nights & Bad Mornings
2013	"Play"	Good Nights & Bad Mornings
2014	"Doing Fine"	Good Nights & Bad Mornings
2015	"Bet That I Will"	The Rest Comes Later
2016	"AyAyAy!"	The Rest Comes Later
2016	"Nights" (featuring W. Darling)	Half Way There... Pt. 1
2016	"Flexicution Remix"	Non-album singles
2016	"Uhh"	Non-album singles
2016	"Despierta"	Non-album singles
2016	"Snooze"	Non-album singles
2016	"No Lie"	Non-album singles
2017	"Let U Go"	Non-album singles
2017	"I Don't Wanna Leave Remix" (featuring Tdot Illdude and Charlie Heat)	Non-album singles
2017	"Waste Of Time"	Non-album singles
2017	"Problems"	Non-album singles
2017	"Nuestra Cancion Pt. 2" (featuring Arcángel)	Non-album singles
2017	"Vibe Higher Cypher 1" (featuring Lex the Great and Castro Escobar)	Non-album singles
2017	"Vibe Higher Cypher 2" (featuring Castro Escobar and Lex the Great)	Non-album singles
2017	"Vibe Higher Cypher 3" (featuring Lex the Great and Castro Escobar)	Non-album singles
2017	"Vibe Higher Cypher 4" (featuring Lex the Great and Castro Escobar)	Non-album singles
2018	"Anyway" (featuring Castro Escobar and Lex the Great)	Vibe Higher
2018	"Gimme Time" (featuring Castro Escobar)	Vibe Higher
2018	"Faith" (featuring Castro Escobar)	Vibe Higher
2018	"Help a Bitch Out" (featuring O.T. Genasis)	Non-album singles
2018	"Myself" (featuring DRAM)	Non-album singles
2018	"La Historia" (ScoobyDoo Freestyle)	Non-album singles
2018	"Vibe Higher Cypher 2018" (featuring Castro Escobar, Lex the Great and AJ Hernz)	Non-album singles
2018	"Today I Decided"	Non-album singles
2018	"Goin' Off"	Non-album singles
2018	"Dale Gas" (featuring Alemán)	Non-album singles
2019	"Gaslight"	Non-album singles
2019	"Bilingue"	Non-album singles
2019	"Vibe Higher Cypher 6" (featuring Jandro and Castro Escobar)	Non-album singles
2019	"Say Bitch"	Non-album singles
2019	"Butter"	Non-album singles
2019	"Petty"	Non-album singles

== Guest appearances ==
List of non-single guest appearances, with other performing artists, showing year released and album name
Title	Year	Other artist(s)	Album
"Enough"	2009	Troublesome, Big D	Throwed in the Game
"Alguien" (credited as Claudia White)	2010	Jaime Kohen	Fotosíntesis
"Dats Right"	2010	Taronica	The Ladies Room
"Break'Em"	2010	None	Strong Arm Thizz Latin Volume 1
"Diggin"	2011	MC Magic, Twista, Lil Cece	The Rewire
"Wayy-UP"	2011	D-Rich, Cynikal 3000	None
"Chasin Paper"	2011	Layzie Bone	The Definition
"I'm Dat Raw" (Remix)	2012	DJ Paul	None
"Her Monologue / Embrace Your Issues"	2012	Issues, Scout	Black Diamonds
"Friday Night"	2012	JCee	None
"Damage"	2012	Krizz Kaliko	Neh'mind
"Headphones"	2012	2Tone	Keep Pushin
"Tru Dat"	2012	Juice	ARTofficial
"Who Wanna Blaze"	2013	Baby Bash, Paul Wall	Unsung - The Album / The Legalizers, Vol. 2: Indoor Grow
"Love"	2013	Blue, the Misfit	Child in the Wild
"IDK"	2013	2Tone	Cali Roller Coaster
"Not for the Weak Minded"	2014	Crooked I	SXEW Vol. 2
"You Don't Really Want It"	2014	Chris Webby, Jon Connor	The Checkup
"BTCHSM"	2014	Honey C	Like a Drug
"Light It Up"	2014	So Real, Neeko Muzik	Big Business
"All Black Everything"	2015	B-Real, Demrick	The Prescription
"Latinos Somos Muchos" (credited as Snow White Tha Product)	2015	ALEX FATT	Why Lie?
"Kill At Will"	2016	Joell Ortiz, Big Daddy Kane, Token, Chris Rivers	That's Hip Hop - Generation Next
"How I'm Feelin'"	2018	Tech N9ne, Navé Monjo	Planet
"Act Like You Know"	2018	Vibe Higher, Castro Escobar	Vibe Higher
"On Deck"	2018	Vibe Higher, Castro Escobar	Vibe Higher
"Lie to Me"	2018	Vibe Higher, Jandro	Vibe Higher
"Faith"	2018	Vibe Higher, Castro Escobar	Vibe Higher
"Stressing"	2018	Vibe Higher, Castro Escobar, Jandro	Vibe Higher
"Right Now"	2018	Vibe Higher, Castro Escobar, Lex The Great	Vibe Higher
"Talking Loud"	2018	Vibe Higher, Jandro	Vibe Higher
"For Real"	2018	Vibe Higher, AJ Hernz	Vibe Higher
"Get That"	2018	Vibe Higher, Castro Escobar, Lex The Great	Vibe Higher
"Anyway"	2018	Vibe Higher, Castro Escobar, Lex The Great	Vibe Higher
"Background"	2018	Vibe Higher, Castro Escobar, Lex The Great	Vibe Higher
"Ride"	2018	Vibe Higher, Castro Escobar	Vibe Higher
"Don't Wait"	2018	Vibe Higher, Castro Escobar, AJ Hernz	Vibe Higher
"One More Time"	2018	Vibe Higher, AJ Hernz	Vibe Higher
"Rah Rah"	2018	Vibe Higher, Jandro	Vibe Higher
"Run It Up"	2019	Caspa Da Ghostman	Rain Drops N Dank Crops
"I Scream" (Unreleased)	2019	Melanie Martinez	None
"Pa' Tras"	2020	None	Por La Cultura Mixtape Vol. 1
"Deebo"	2021	D Smoke	Black Habits (Deluxe)
"Tengo To"	2021	Nicki Nicole, Ptazeta	Parte de Mí
"A Lot At Stake"	2021	Dax	Pain Paints Paintings
"Te Alejaste"	2022	Junior H	Contingente
"Bye"	2022	Myguel	Zerotonin
"Otra Ronda"	2023	None	Marvel Lucha Libre (Banda Sonora Original)
"Doggys"	2024	Fariana	Underwater
"La Manera"	2024	Victor Mendivil	No Hay Ángeles Aquí
"So So So Good"	2025	Too $hort	Sir Too $hort, Vol. 2 (Drink & Smoke)

== Other songs ==
Title	Year	Album
"Pretty Flacko Remix"	2012	Non-album songs
"Hands on the Wheel Freestyle"	2012	Non-album songs
"Shot Caller Freestyle"	2012	Non-album songs
"Murda Bizness Freestyle"	2012	Non-album songs
"Neva Gave A Fuck Freestyle"	2012	Non-album songs
"LIVE Verse 2013"	2013	Non-album songs
"Fire"	2014	Catch the Throne
"Far Alone Remix"	2014	Non-album songs
"2015"	2015	Non-album songs
"Here (Remix)"	2016	Non-album songs
"Let U Go"	2016	Non-album songs
"7 Days"	2016	Non-album songs
"Funny"	2019	Non-album songs
