= Next Time Believe Me =

Mixtape by Snow Tha Product

Next Time, Believe Me

Mixtape by Snow Tha Product
- Released: November 6, 2026
- Recorded: 2026
- Genres: Latin urban, hip hop
- Length: 40 minutes
- Labels: Snow Tha Product, Inc., Universal Music Latino (distribution)

Next Time, Believe Me is a mixtape by Mexican-American rapper and singer Snow Tha Product, released independently on November 6, 2026, with distribution through Universal Music Latino. Spanning 17 tracks with a total runtime of 40 minutes, the project explores themes of personal independence, industry skepticism, socio-political commentary, and interpersonal relationships.

== Background and release ==
Following her previous work, Before I Crash Out, Snow Tha Product conceptualized Next Time, Believe Me as a continuation of her unfiltered style, giving herself more space to incorporate melodic singing alongside her signature rapid-fire rap delivery. The title reflects a central life statement concerning industry doubters, broken friendships, and skepticism from peers when an artist pushes creative boundaries.

In the lead-up to the release, Snow promoted the project through listening sessions, including a prominent event held on November 5, 2026, in Riverside, California. The album rollout also followed her high-profile appearances at New York Fashion Week for designers RIO and The Blondes.

== Composition and themes ==
Musical styles across the 17 tracks span Latin urban, trap, and electronic music elements. Lyrically, the mixtape addresses the realities of operating as an independent artist, managing a self-run team, and speaking openly on political and social issues affecting Latino, queer, and women's communities.

The opening track, "Should've Been Worse", addresses the frustrations of taking the high road and the consequences of remaining silent in business and personal dynamics. The project features guest appearances from several artists, including Tech N9ne, Zhavia, AJ Hernz, Gera MX, Toni Romiti and Chuzzington.

== Track listing ==
1. "Should've Been Worse"
2. "QUE TE DUELA"
3. "I'm Comin' for Mine"
4. "WHAT YOU SAY"
5. "BESTIE"
6. "Tal Para Cual" (featuring Gera MX)
7. "La Llanta" (featuring Chuzzington)
8. "Blue Faces RMX" (featuring AJ Hernz)
9. "Was It Something?" (featuring Toni Romiti)
10. "Blame It On Me" (featuring Zhavia)
11. "Stay On That Side (Uh Huh)"
12. "What It Was"
13. "Come for Me"
14. "You Know I'm Right"
15. "ONLYFLANS"
16. "PA' QUE ME CREAS"
17. "Next Time, Believe Me" (featuring Tech N9ne)

== See also ==
Snow Tha Product discography
