= N9na =

Studio album by Tech N9NE

N9NA

Studio album by Tech N9ne
- Released: April 19, 2019
- Recorded: 2018–19
- Studio: Strangeland Studios; PW Records; Studio Polycarpe; Icon One Studio Music; Sheeesh World Studios; Wisseloord; Mazza Mansion; The Basement; The 765; Soundetails; Dammit Boy Entertainment
- Genre: Hip-hop
- Length: 1:07:32
- Label: Strange Music
- Producer: Travis O'Guin (exec.); Freek Van Workum; ItsNicklus; Seven; Hndrc; Dominique Sanders; Anthony L. Saunders; King Iso; Alexander West

Tech N9ne chronology
| Planet (2018) | N9NA (2019) | Enterfear (2020) |

Professional ratings
Review scores
| Source | Rating |
|---|---|
| AllMusic | 4/5 stars |
| HipHopDX | 3.7/5 |

N9NA (pronounced Nina) is the twenty-first studio album by American rapper Tech N9ne. It was released on April 19, 2019, via Strange Music with distribution via INgrooves. Production was handled by eight record producers, including Michael "Seven" Summers, who produced ⅓ of the album. The LP features guest appearances from Krizz Kaliko, JL, King Iso, Church Boii, C-Mob, Futuristic, JellyRoll, Maez301 and Navé Monjo.

A music video for the title track was directed by Tristan Zammit and released on April 11, 2019. Music video for "Like I Ain't" was released on the same day as the album.

== N9NA Collections ==
The full-length was preceded by two four-track extended plays: N9NA Collection 1, which was released on November 2, 2018, and N9NA Collection 2, which was released on March 8, 2019. Songs "N9NA", "Hit the Ground Running", "Chuki Fever" and "H.O.B." were included in the first EP, and the second one was composed of "I Caught Crazy! (4Ever)", "EDI's", "F.T.I. 2.0" and "Death Threats".

The song "Death Threats" is not present on the full LP, as it, along with the song, "My Own Zone," couldn't fit into the album's runtime.

== Track listing ==
| No. | Title | Writer(s) | Producer(s) | Length |
|---|---|---|---|---|
| 1. | "Le Horde" (Intro) | | | 0:29 |
| 2. | "Lord of Weird" | A. Yates; D. Sanders | Dominique Sanders | 2:31 |
| 3. | "N9NA" | A. Yates; M. Summers | Seven | 3:22 |
| 4. | "Hit the Ground Running" (featuring JL B. Hood and King Iso) | A. Yates; J. Varnes; T. Gulledge; A. Saunders | Anthony L. Saunders | 3:18 |
| 5. | "Like I Ain't" | A. Yates; T. O'Guin; F. van Workum; N. Luscombe; H. Büenck | Freek van Workum; ItsNicklus; HNDRC | 3:42 |
| 6. | "Green Lit" (featuring King Iso and Maez301) | A. Yates; H. Keller; T. Gulledge; F. van Workum; N. Luscombe | Freek van Workum; ItsNicklus | 3:15 |
| 7. | "Chuki Fever" | A. Yates; D. Sanders | Dominique Sanders | 3:35 |
| 8. | "F'n Do It" (featuring JL B. Hood and Futuristic) | A. Yates; M. Summers; S. Watson; J. Varnes; Z. Beck | Seven | 3:30 |
| 9. | "Don't Let Me Fall" (featuring Krizz Kaliko) | A. Yates; S. Watson; F. van Workum; N. Luscombe; H. Büenck | Freek van Workum; ItsNicklus; HNDRC | 3:07 |
| 10. | "You Line!" (featuring Krizz Kaliko) | A. Yates; S. Watson; F. van Workum; N. Luscombe; H. Büenck | Freek van Workum; ItsNicklus; HNDRC | 3:05 |
| 11. | "EDI's" | A. Yates; F. van Workum; N. Luscombe; H. Büenck | Freek van Workum; ItsNicklus; HNDRC | 2:59 |
| 12. | "Rata" (featuring Krizz Kaliko) | A. Yates; S. Watson; M. Summers | Seven | 3:06 |
| 13. | "F.T.I. 2.0" | A. Yates; M. Summers; T. O'Guin | Seven | 2:44 |
| 14. | "She Fell" | A. Yates; T. Gulledge | King Iso | 4:24 |
| 15. | "Sink" | A. Yates; M. Summers | Seven | 3:26 |
| 16. | "H.O.B." (featuring Navé Monjo) | A. Yates; D. Sanders; E. Hancock | Dominique Sanders | 3:55 |
| 17. | "Ion Memba" (featuring C-Mob) | A. Yates; S. Watson; C. Doehla; F. van Workum; N. Luscombe | Freek van Workum; ItsNicklus | 3:03 |
| 18. | "Active" (featuring Krizz Kaliko) | A. Yates; S. Watson; F. van Workum; N. Luscombe; H. Büenck | Freek van Workum; ItsNicklus; HNDRC | 3:15 |
| 19. | "EF U (Easier for You)" (featuring Krizz Kaliko and Jelly Roll) | A. Yates; S. Watson; J. DeFord; D. Sanders; A. West | Dominique Sanders; Alexander West (co.) | 3:55 |
| 20. | "I Caught Crazy! (4EVER)" | A. Yates; M. Summers | Seven | 2:52 |
| 21. | "I'm Sorry" (featuring Church Boii) | A. Yates; M. Summers | Seven | 3:59 |
| Total length: | | | | 1:07:32 |

Strange Music pre-order digital bonus track
| No. | Title | Producer(s) | Length |
|---|---|---|---|
| 22. | "Disparagement" (featuring Krizz Kaliko and King Iso) | Freek van Workum; ItsNicklus | 4:07 |

Leftover Tracks
| No. | Title | Length |
|---|---|---|
| 1. | "Death Threats" (featuring King Iso) | 3:05 |
| 2. | "My Own Zone" (featuring Futuristic and Dizzy Wright) | 4:02 |

== Personnel ==
- Aaron Dontez Yates – main artist, vocals & songwriter (tracks: 2–21), A&R
- Jason "JL" Varnes – featured artist, vocals & songwriter (tracks: 4, 8)
- Samuel William Christopher Watson IV – featured artist, vocals (tracks: 9, 10, 12, 18, 19), additional vocals (tracks: 1, 2, 14, 17, 21), songwriter (tracks: 8–10, 12, 17–19)
- Tarrel C. "King Iso" Gulledge – featured artist, vocals (tracks: 4, 6), songwriter (tracks: 4, 6, 14), producer (track 14)
- Hasaan "Maez301" Keller – featured artist, vocals & songwriter (track 6), additional vocals (track 10)
- Zachary Lewis Beck – featured artist, vocals & songwriter (track 8)
- Evan "Navé Monjo" Hancock – featured artist, vocals & songwriter (track 16)
- Christopher "C-Mob" Doehla – featured artist, vocals & songwriter (track 17)
- Jason DeFord – featured artist, vocals & songwriter (track 19)
- Church Boii – featured artist, additional vocals (track 21)
- Nicholas Luscombe – additional vocals (track 1), songwriter & producer (tracks: 5, 6, 9–11, 17, 18)
- Joshua Kelly – additional vocals (track 1)
- Kaitlyn Toepperwein – additional vocals (track 1)
- Alina Burch – additional vocals (track 1)
- Sydney Barta – additional vocals (track 1)
- Jayla Kearney – additional vocals (track 1)
- Crystal Watson – additional vocals (tracks: 3, 8)
- Delynia Brown – additional vocals (tracks: 3, 8)
- Trey Swager – additional vocals (track 3)
- Kerry Rounds – additional vocals (track 3)
- Spencer Chaney – additional vocals (track 3)
- Isabella Sherman – additional vocals (track 7)
- Sean Tyler – additional vocals (tracks: 10, 14, 21)
- Tasha Smith – additional vocals (tracks: 14, 16)
- Spinstyles – scratches (track 3)
- Ben Cybulsky – guitars (track 3), mixing, recording
- Steven Lambert – tenor saxophone & flute (track 3)
- Jason Goudeau – trombone (track 3)
- Clint Ashlock – trumpet (track 3)
- James Ward – tuba (track 3)
- Igor Osypov – guitars (track 19)
- Alexander West – songwriter, guitars & co-producer (track 19)
- Dominique Sanders – songwriter & producer (tracks: 2, 7, 16, 19)
- Michael "Seven" Summers – songwriter & producer (tracks: 3, 8, 12, 13, 15, 20, 21)
- Anthony L. Saunders – songwriter & producer (track 4)
- Frederikus van Workum – songwriter & producer (tracks: 5, 6, 9–11, 17, 18)
- Hendric Bünck – songwriter & producer (tracks: 5, 9–11, 18)
- Travis O'Guin – songwriter (tracks: 5, 13), executive producer, A&R
- Tom Baker – mastering

== Charts ==
| Chart (2019) | Peak position |
|---|---|
| Australian Digital Albums (ARIA) | 45 |
| US Billboard 200 | 34 |
| US Independent Albums (Billboard) | 3 |
| US Top R&B/Hip-Hop Albums (Billboard) | 21 |

== See also ==
- 2019 in hip-hop
