= Bliss (Tech N9ne album) =

Studio album by Tech N9ne
- Released: July 14, 2023
- Studio: Strangeland
- Genre: Hip-hop
- Length: 76:00
- Label: Strange Music
- Producer: Freek van Workum; ItsNicklus; Hndrc; DJ Doc; Dame; Dominique Sanders; Wyshmaster; Ervin Pope; HU$H; Tyler Lyon; Goodro; Anthony L. Saunders

Tech N9ne chronology
Asin9ne (2021)	Bliss (2023)	COSM (2024)

Singles from Bliss
- 1. "Screen" Released: November 18, 2022; 2. "Tell Everyone" Released: February 17, 2023; 3. "Things I Like" Released: March 10, 2023; 4. "3D" Released: April 7, 2023; 5. "Fatha Fig Ya (Food for Thought)" Released: June 16, 2023; 6. "Drill Sergeant" Released: July 28, 2023; 7. "Pull Out" Released: September 19, 2023

Bliss is the twenty-fourth studio album by American rapper Tech N9ne. It was released on July 14, 2023, through Strange Music and RBC Records. Guests on the album include Conway the Machine, Joyner Lucas, X-Raided, Qveen Herby, Durand Bernarr and a variety of local Kansas City acts including the Popper, 2 Gunn Kevi as well as members of Tech N9nes longtime rap group Nnutthowze, Phlaque the Grimstress and Zkeircrow.

== Promotion ==
On November 18, 2022, Tech N9ne premiered the official video to "Screen".

On February 17, Tech N9ne released the single "Tell Everyone" featuring Isaac Cates and Ordained on his official YouTube channel as an anthem for his favorite team the Kansas City Chiefs, after performing at the teams victory parade and rally succeeding Super Bowl LVII.

On March 10, the official music video to "Things I Like" was released via Techs official YouTube channel.

On April 7, Tech N9ne invited nineteen fans to the Strange Music headquarters to watch the video to the track "3D", in which they were instructed to wear 3D glasses whilst doing so. After the videos conclusion, despite claiming he wouldn't be present, he popped out from behind the projector the video was presented on shocking the viewers.

In lieu of Fathers Day, on June 16, the video to "Fatha Fig Ya (Food for Thought)" featuring RMR was released as a nod to all patriarchs.

On July 28, in efforts to bring awareness to gun violence among the black community and misconceptions of fame, Tech released the video to "Drill Sergeant".

The music video to "Pull Out" featuring Head Da Don was released on September 19, 2023.

== Critical reception ==
Professional ratings
Review scores
Source	Rating
UndergroundHipHopBlog	5/10

At The Pitch KC, Belle Yennie expressed that, "stunningly different, Bliss highlights how Tech N9ne can quite literally do it all, incorporating textured scream sections with Kim Dracula and fluid vocals from Durand Bernarr. Though Tech was a little unsure of the number of collaborative artists on the album, the exciting challenge paid off and every song originally planned earned a rightful spot. The album showcases Tech's versatility and lyrically moving talent both working individually and with others."

A writer at UndergroundHipHopBlog under the name "Legends Will Never Die" stated in his article that the album "didn't need to be 25 tracks/76 minutes long" and that all the guest artists "perform on his caliber at best or mid to unlistenable at worst".

== Track listing ==
Bliss track listing
No.	Title	Writer(s)	Producer(s)	Length
1.	"Welcome to the P.I.T.S. (skit)"	A. Yates; F. van Workum; N. Luscombe; H. Bunck	Freek van Workum; ItsNicklus; Hndrc; DJ Doc	0:48
2.	"Badge of Honor"	A. Yates; N. Luscombe; F. Van Workum; T. Lyon	Freek van Workum; ItsNicklus	4:02
3.	"Knock" (featuring Conway the Machine, Joyner Lucas and X-Raided)	A. Yates; D. Price; G. Lucas, Jr.; A. Brown; D. Gomez	Dame	5:24
4.	"KC Huh? KC What?" (featuring Roblo DaStar, King D and Lil Ava)	Yates; R. Lucky; D. Blackwell; A. Foster; D. Gomez	Dame	3:53
5.	"They Know Meh" (featuring the Popper)	Yates; W. Edwin; D. Sanders	Dominique Sanders	3:27
6.	"Y'all Having a Good Time?! (skit)"	Yates; A. Cherrington	Wyshmaster	0:35
7.	"Tell Everyone" (featuring Isaac Cates and Ordained)	Yates; N. Luscombe; F. van Workum	Freek van Workum; ItsNicklus	2:59
8.	"Things I Like"	Yates; E. Pope	Ervin Pope	3:07
9.	"3D"	Yates; N. Luscombe; F. van Workum	Freek van Workum; ItsNicklus	3:04
10.	"W H A T (We're Hungry and Thirsty)" (featuring Kim Dracula and HU$H)	Yates; N. Luscombe; F. van Workum; T. Lyon; A. Shier; S. Wellings	HU$H; Freek van Workum; ItsNicklus	3:04
11.	"Crowd Participation (skit)"	Yates; A. Cherrington	Wyshmaster	0:36
12.	"Wess Paul Bennett" (featuring Joey Cool and King Iso)	Yates; T. Gulledge; T. Johnson; A. Cherrington	Wyshmaster	4:29
13.	"Pull Out" (featuring Head Da Don)	Yates; D. Baylis; G. Jackson	Goodro	3:39
14.	"Fatha Fig Ya (Food for Thought)" (featuring RMR)	Yates; P. Geebae; T. Lyon; D. Gomez	Dame; Tyler Lyon	2:50
15.	"Reach Us" (featuring X-Raided, 2Gunn Kevi and Head Da Don)	A. Yates; A. Brown; K. Bifford; G. Jackson; N. Luscombe; F. van Workum	Freek van Workum; ItsNicklus	3:25
16.	"Red Aura" (featuring Durand Bernarr and Qveen Herby)	A. Yates; B. Ferebee; A. Noonan; D. Gomez	Dame	3:02
17.	"Screen (album version)" (featuring Jehry Robinson)	A. Yates; F. van Workum; N. Luscombe	Freek van Workum; ItsNicklus	4:41
18.	"That Was Dope! (skit)"	A. Yates		0:32
19.	"Drill Sergeant"	A. Yates; F. van Workum; N. Luscombe	Freek van Workum; ItsNicklus	2:59
20.	"Bro So Mo (Lemony Snicket's)"	A. Yates; D. Gomez	Dame	3:39
21.	"I Met a Morph" (featuring UBI)	A. Yates; M. Viglione; D. Gomez	Dame	4:05
22.	"Problem at the Pump (skit)"			1:02
23.	"Deer Alley"	A. Yates; D. Gomez; A. Saunders	Dame; Anthony L. Saunders	2:42
24.	"2 Happy" (featuring Nnutthowze – Zkeircrow & Phlaque the Grimstress)	A. Yates; E. Figures; A. Khalifah; D. Gomez	Dame	4:43
25.	"Got What I Wanted" (featuring Navé Monjo)	A. Yates; E. Hancock; E. Pope	Ervin Pope	3:34
Total length:				76:00

Pre-order bonus track
No.	Title	Writer(s)	Length
1.	"Rhythm Idea"	A. Yates; F. van Workum; N. Luscombe	2:18
