= Red Kingdom =

Single by Tech N9ne
- Released: September 11, 2019
- Genre: Hip-hop
- Length: 2:21
- Label: Strange Music
- Songwriters: Aaron Yates; Tarrel Gulledge
- Producer: King Iso

Tech N9ne singles chronology
"Disparagement" (2019)	"Red Kingdom" (2019)	"Shut Up" (2019)

Audio
- "Red Kingdom" on YouTube

"Red Kingdom" is a song by American rapper Tech N9ne. It was released on January 18, 2019, onto YouTube, and on September 11, 2019, onto streaming platforms, through Strange Music. The song is an anthem dedicated to the Kansas City Chiefs, the rapper's hometown NFL team. Following its release, the song quickly gained traction, becoming an unofficial anthem for the team, especially during their 2019–20 Super Bowl-winning season.

== In popular culture ==
The song has been used in promotional material associated with the Chiefs and Republican TikTok.

== Live performances ==
Tech N9ne performed the song live at The Granada in Lawrence on October 17, 2024. The song has also been played at Arrowhead Stadium.

== Remix ==
A remix by Brazilian singer-songwriter Luísa Sonza, entitled "Red Kingdom BR", was released ahead of the Chiefs game in São Paulo.

== Personnel ==
Credits adapted from Apple Music.

- Tech N9ne – vocals, songwriter
- King Iso – producer, songwriter

== Charts ==
Chart performance for "Red Kingdom"
Chart (2020)	Peak position
US Digital Song Sales (Billboard)	17
US R&B/Hip-Hop Digital Song Sales (Billboard)	4
