= COSM =

Studio album by Tech N9ne
- Released: July 12, 2024
- Studio: Strangeland
- Genre: Hip-hop
- Length: 78:24
- Label: Strange Music
- Producer: Anthony L. Saunders; Igor; Wyshmaster; Mario Casalini; Freek Van Workum; ItsNicklus; Nick Furlong

Tech N9ne chronology
| Bliss (2023) | COSM (2024) | 5816 Forest (2025) |

Tech N9ne Collabos chronology
| Strange Reign (2017) | COSM (2024) |

Singles from COSM
- 1. "Roll Call" Released: February 9, 2024; 2. "P.O.W." Released: April 5, 2024; 3. "Boomer Rang" Released: May 3, 2024; 4. "Drippy Drop" Released: May 31, 2024; 5. "No Popcorn" Released: July 11, 2024

COSM (an acronym for Class of Strange Music) is the twenty-fifth studio album by American rapper Tech N9ne, the ninth in his "Collabos" series. The album was released on July 12, 2024, by Strange Music. The album features current Strange Music artists as well as previous Strange Music artists. In addition to Strange Music artists, the album also features appearances from Kevin Gates, Snow Tha Product, Fatman Scoop, Killer Mike, Hopsin, LaRussell. Keak Da Sneak, Daylyt, K.A.A.N. and Trae Tha Truth as well as many underground artists, primarily Kansas City based, who were never a part of the Strange Music imprint.

== Background ==
The album was announced by Tech on Instagram on January 19, 2024.

== Singles ==
The first single, "Roll Call", was released on February 9, 2024. The second single, "P.O.W.", was released on April 5, 2024. The third single, "Boomer Rang", was released on May 3, 2024. The fourth single, "Drippy Drop", was released on May 31, 2024. The fifth and final single, "No Popcorn" featuring Fatman Scoop, was released on July 11, 2024, 51 days before Fatman Scoop collapsed on stage and died.

== Track listing ==
COSM track listing
| No. | Title | Writer(s) | Producer(s) | Length |
|---|---|---|---|---|
| 1. | "Greetings (Skit)" | Aaron D. Yates | | 0:28 |
| 2. | "No Popcorn" (featuring Fatman Scoop) | Aaron D. Yates, Isaac Freeman III, Anthony L. Saunders | | 3:15 |
| 3. | "Bigger" (featuring Zkeircrow and King Iso) | Aaron D. Yates, Adam Cherrington, Tarrel C. Gulledge, Igor Nudelman, Elijah J. Figures, Sr. | | 3:43 |
| 4. | "ZOD (I Win I Always Win)" (featuring Kevin Gates, Snow Tha Product, and Joey Cool) | Aaron D. Yates, Kevin Gates, Claudia Feliciano, Taven Johnson, Mario Casalini | Mario Casalini | 6:08 |
| 5. | "Disgusted" (featuring Ordained, Killer Mike, and Hopsin) | Aaron D. Yates, Igor Nudelman, Michael Render, Marcus Hopson, Adam Cherrington | | 4:04 |
| 6. | "Roll Call" (featuring King Iso, Joey Cool, JL, Lex Bratcher, X-Raided, and Rittz) | Aaron D. Yates, Tarrel C. Gulledge, Taven Johnson, Jason Varnes, Alexis Andrea Stratton-Bratcher, Anerae Brown, Jonathan McCollum | Wyshmaster | 6:03 |
| 7. | "Let It Bang" (featuring Y8$) | Aaron D. Yates, Dontez A. Yates, Mario Casalini | | 2:50 |
| 8. | "Sour Dough" (featuring LaRussell, Keak da Sneak, and Stunnaman02) | Aaron D. Yates, Charles Williams, Mario Casalini, Mike S. Viglione, LaRussell Thomas Jordan Gomes | | 3:06 |
| 9. | "I'm Just Tryna Get" (featuring Roblo DaStar, Miss Kush, Shay Lyriq, and KC Young Boss) | Aaron D. Yates, Mario Casalini, Dontaydra Bowens, Robin Lucky, Cecily Johnson-Hilton, Julius J. Floyd | | 3:58 |
| 10. | "Walter Sobchak (Am I Wrong?)" (featuring X-Raided and The Popper) | Aaron D. Yates, Walter Edwin, Mario Casalini, Anerae Brown | | 3:38 |
| 11. | "P.O.W." (featuring Marley Young) | Aaron D. Yates, Frederikus van Workum, Nicholas Luscombe, Ray G. Patrick, Steven J. Vest II | Freek van Workum | 3:27 |
| 12. | "Bathroom (Skit)" | Aaron D. Yates | | 0:43 |
| 13. | "Drippy Drop" (featuring Skatterman & Snug Brim) | Aaron D. Yates, Adam Cherrington, Stacy Landis, Aaron Henderson | | 3:56 |
| 14. | "The Ghost of Rosetta Tharpe" (featuring Ako Mack and Lajon Witherspoon) | Aaron D. Yates, Adam Cherrington, Assayanda Ako Mack, Lajon Witherspoon | | 3:21 |
| 15. | "Sin Miedo" (featuring Zkeircrow, G-Mo Skee, and Phlaque the Grimstress) | Aaron D. Yates, Nick Furlong, Adam Cherrington, Jaron Johnson, Elijah J. Figures, Sr., A'sya Khalifah | | 3:21 |
| 16. | "I Got Time Today" (featuring ¡Mayday!) | Aaron D. Yates, Bernardo Garcia, Benjamin Miller, Mario Casalini, Andrews Mujica | | 4:20 |
| 17. | "Take That L9ve Back?" (featuring Marcus Yates and Daylyt) | Aaron D. Yates, Adam Cherrington, Marcus Yates, Davone Campbell, Igor Nudelman | | 3:37 |
| 18. | "Boomer Rang" (featuring Stevie Stone, K.A.A.N., and Ubi) | Aaron D. Yates, Adam Cherrington, Brandon Perry, Mike S. Viglione, Igor Nudelman | | 4:43 |
| 19. | "L.9.V.E. 4EVA (Skit)" | Aaron D. Yates | | 0:28 |
| 20. | "I Know the Real" (featuring C-Mob and Sovi Haze) | Aaron D. Yates, Adam Cherrington, Christopher Doehla, Sovereign Hayze | | 3:43 |
| 21. | "Sniper's Remorse" (featuring Trae tha Truth and King Iso) | Aaron D. Yates, Frederikus van Workum, Nicholas Luscombe, Tarrel C. Gulledge, Frazier O. Thompson III | Freek van Workum | 3:06 |
| 22. | "Underdog" (featuring X-Raided and Head da Don) | Aaron D. Yates, Anerae Brown, Jonathan McCollum | | 3:52 |
| 23. | "Ain't Gon Be Another" (featuring Jehry Robinson and Blane Howard) | Aaron D. Yates, Marcus Hopson, Jehry Robinson, Blane Howard | | 3:06 |
| Total length: | | | | 78:24 |
