= Face Off (Tech N9ne song) =

2021 single by Tech N9ne, Joey Cool, King Iso and Dwayne Johnson

Single by Tech N9ne featuring Joey Cool, King Iso and Dwayne Johnson

from the album Asin9ne
- Released: October 8, 2021
- Genre: Hip hop
- Length: 3:39
- Label: Strange
- Songwriters: Aaron Yates; Taven Johnson; Tarrel Gulledge; Dwayne Johnson; Samuel Watson IV; Michael Summers
- Producer: Seven

Tech N9ne singles chronology
"Let Up" (2021)	"Face Off" (2021)	"Warfare" (2021)

Joey Cool singles chronology
"Don't Touch Me" (2021)	"Face Off" (2021)

King Iso singles chronology
"Omaha" (2021)	"Face Off" (2021)	"Room At the Table" (2022)

Dwayne Johnson singles chronology
"You're Welcome" (2016)	"Face Off" (2021)

Music video
- "Face Off" on YouTube

"Face Off" is a song by American rapper Tech N9ne featuring fellow American rappers Joey Cool and King Iso and American actor and wrestler Dwayne Johnson. It was released on October 8, 2021, as the lead single from Tech N9ne's twenty-third studio album Asin9ne. The song also features uncredited vocals from rapper Krizz Kaliko and was produced by Seven.

== Background ==
In 2020, Tech N9ne contacted Dwayne Johnson about the song through private message on Instagram and suggested a collaboration. Tech initially had the idea of Johnson reciting spoken words of motivation to close out the song, but Johnson ended up writing his own lyrics to the song. Johnson's verse was inspired from a conversation that he and N9ne had when they were on the set of the comedy-drama series Ballers, about being the "hardest worker in the room"; Johnson told Variety, "He said something that I really appreciated: basically, 'There could never be enough food in this room or on this set that could make me full because I always want to be hungry.' I just love that."

The message of the song revolves around work ethic. Regarding the song, Tech N9ne said, "This is an energy song. This is going to get people pumped up to lift weights, pumped up for fights, pumped up for the game. Period." He also stated that as the reason he wanted Johnson to appear on the track. While on the phone, Johnson structured his verse with N9ne, who helped him with his word structure, cadence and flow. They had already planned to end with the words "extreme mana", so they worked backwards. After that, he went into the studio with his wife, Lauren Hashian. According to Johnson, he took "three big swigs" of Teremana tequila and then recorded his verse in one take. The recording had occurred during the COVID-19 pandemic.

== Composition and lyrics ==
The song contains a hook from Krizz Kaliko: "Rumble / They gon' take your face off / They gon' rumble / They gon' take your face off". Dwayne Johnson raps the final verse of the track in a similar manner to that of the other rappers in terms of speed and intensity: "It's about drive, it's about power, we stay hungry, we devour / Put in the work, put in the hours and take what's ours / Black and Samoan in my veins, my culture bangin' with Strange / I change the game, so what's my motherfuckin' name?" The song ends with an outro from Johnson, who thanks his "brother" Tech N9ne and his own tequila brand Teremana, and brags, "One take, that's a wrap. Face off."

== Reception ==
"Face Off" has received positive reviews from critics and fans alike, with praise especially directed toward Johnson's performance. Writing for Consequence, Wren Graves commented, "You might not want to award him a Grammy just yet, but it's definitely not history's most embarrassing celebrity rap." William Hughes of The A.V. Club described Johnson placing last in the order of verses as "extremely funny", although expressing only a small amount of disapproval: "The effect, then, is of steady acceleration in the flow of the song, with King Iso, especially, delivering lines so fast that they pick up the staccato beat of a snare drum. The sudden switch to The Rock—rapping reasonably credibly, but not especially swiftly, and in a voice that can only be The Rock's — is a juxtaposition that cannot be properly handled by the human brain without a sudden snort of laughter."

Dwayne Johnson's verse went viral on the video-sharing app TikTok and was used in over 49,000 videos, including Fortnite videos and shorts. It also sparked a wave of memes satirizing "extreme fitness" culture and "hustle culture".

"Face Off" went to number one on the TikTok US Top Tracks, number one on the iTunes Top Hip-Hop/Rap Songs Chart and trended as the number one video on YouTube for three days.

== Music video ==
The official music video was released alongside the single. It was co-directed by Cameron Logan Cox and Chris Stempel. The video begins with Dwayne Johnson conversing with Tech N9ne; the two declare that they are going to "give the people more." When Johnson raps, he is "looking fierce as always in a black tank top".

== Charts ==
Chart performance for "Face Off"
Chart (2021)	Peak position
Canada Hot 100 (Billboard)	77
US Bubbling Under Hot 100 (Billboard)	4
US Hot R&B/Hip-Hop Songs (Billboard)	45
