= Asin9ne =

Studio album by Tech N9ne
- Released: October 8, 2021
- Studio: The Seuss Room (Topeka, Kansas); The Shao Dojo (London); Vibehigher (Los Angeles, California); Bloc Star Evolution (Henderson, Nevada); The Trophy Room (Sparks, Nevada); Night Fusion (Miami, Florida); Mojo Land (Kansas City, Missouri); Marcus Yates' House (Kansas City, Missouri)
- Genre: Hip-hop
- Length: 63:45
- Label: Strange
- Producer: Ervin 'EP' Pope; Freek Van Workum; ItsNicklus; KROPSi; Paul Salva; Seven; The Pushers; Tyler Pursel; Wyshmaster

Tech N9ne chronology
| Enterfear (2020) | Asin9ne (2021) | Bliss (2023) |

Singles from Asin9ne
- 1. "Face Off" Released: October 8, 2021

Professional ratings
Review scores
| Source | Rating |
|---|---|
| AllMusic | 3.5/5 stars |

Asin9ne (stylized in all caps) is the twenty-third studio album by American rapper Tech N9ne. It was released on October 8, 2021, via Strange Music. Production was handled by Wyshmaster, Freek Van Workum, ItsNicklus, Paul Salva, Ervin Pope, The Pushers, Brodinski, KROPSi, Seven and Tyler Pursel, with Travis O'Guin serving as executive producer. It features guest appearances from King Iso, Ashten Ray, Dwayne Johnson, E-40, Garrett Raff, Joey Cool, Kiddo A.I., Lil Wayne, Marcus "Oobergeek" Yates, Marley Young, Mumu Fresh, Navé Monjo, Nnutthowze-Zkeircrow, Phlaque The Grimstress, Russ, Seuss Mace, Shao Dow, Simeon Taylor, Snow Tha Product, Stige, and X-Raided. The album peaked at number 82 on the Billboard 200, number 41 on the Top R&B/Hip-Hop Albums, and number 11 on the Independent Albums in the US.

== Track listing ==
| No. | Title | Producer(s) | Length |
|---|---|---|---|
| 1. | "The Herder" | Wyshmaster | 3:55 |
| 2. | "I Don't Fit" (featuring King Iso and Seuss Mace) | Freek van Workum; ItsNicklus | 3:40 |
| 3. | "Kickiter" (featuring Shao Dow) | Paul Salva; Brodinski (co.) | 3:53 |
| 4. | "Too Good" (featuring Lil Wayne and Mumu Fresh) | Ervin 'EP' Pope | 4:32 |
| 5. | "No See Umz" (featuring Snow Tha Product and Russ) | Wyshmaster | 3:15 |
| 6. | "Face Off" (featuring Joey Cool, King Iso, and Dwayne Johnson) | Seven | 3:39 |
| 7. | "Clydesadale" (featuring E-40) | Wyshmaster | 3:10 |
| 8. | "Still Right Here" (featuring X-Raided, Garrett Raff, and Simeon Taylor) | Freek van Workum; ItsNicklus | 5:00 |
| 9. | "Take Your Halo" | Ervin 'EP' Pope | 3:47 |
| 10. | "Knock That Noodle" (featuring Marley Young) | Wyshmaster | 3:29 |
| 11. | "Heightened" | Paul Salva | 2:07 |
| 12. | "What Rhymes with Threat'll Kill Ya" (featuring Nnutthowze-Zkeircrow and Phlaque The Grimstress) | Wyshmaster; KROPSi | 4:27 |
| 13. | "I Been Thru a Lot" (featuring Stige) | The Pushers; Tyler Pursel | 3:41 |
| 14. | "Dial It Back" (featuring Navé Monjo) | Wyshmaster | 3:36 |
| 15. | "Zaza" (featuring Oobergeek) | Wyshmaster | 4:27 |
| 16. | "Close Your Eyes" (featuring Kiddo A.I.) | The Pushers | 3:31 |
| 17. | "Special" (featuring Ashten Ray) | Wyshmaster | 3:34 |

Strange Music pre-order digital bonus track
| No. | Title | Producer(s) | Length |
|---|---|---|---|
| 18. | "Start Stoppin" (featuring Krizz Kaliko) | Wyshmaster | 3:23 |

== Charts ==
Chart performance for ASIN9NE
| Chart (2021) | Peak position |
|---|---|
| US Billboard 200 | 82 |
| US Top R&B/Hip-Hop Albums (Billboard) | 41 |
| US Independent Albums (Billboard) | 11 |
