= Enterfear =

EnterFear

Studio album by Tech N9ne
- Released: April 17, 2020
- Recorded: 2019–2020
- Studio: Strangeland Studios; Arc Recording Studios (Los Angeles, CA); FBZ HQ (Brooklyn, NY); Furnace Studio (Los Angeles, CA); Mercules Music, Inc. (Comox, BC)
- Genre: Hip hop
- Length: 60:54
- Label: Strange Music
- Producer: Travis O'Guin (exec.); Dame tha Producer; Freek Van Workum; Hndrc; ItsNicklus; Seven

Tech N9ne chronology
N9na (2019)	EnterFear (2020)	Asin9ne (2021)

Singles from Enterfear
- 1. "Feed" Released: March 11, 2020; 2. "Just Die? (Intro)" Released: April 9, 2020

Professional ratings
Review scores
Source	Rating
AllMusic	3.5/5 stars
The Sydney Morning Herald	2/5 stars

EnterFear (stylized in all caps) is the twenty-second studio album by American rapper Tech N9ne.

== Background ==
It was released on April 17, 2020 via Strange Music. Production was handled mostly by Michael "Seven" Summers. It features guest appearances from Krizz Kaliko, King Iso, Landxn Fyre, Flatbush Zombies, Jehry Robinson, Lex Bratcher, Love Mae C, Mackenzie Nicole, Marley Young, Merkules, Navé Monjo and Scru Face Jean. The album's name is a sensational spelling of "interfere".

The full-length was preceded by two extended plays: EnterFear Level 1, which was released on November 22, 2019, and EnterFear Level 2, which was released on January 17, 2020. Songs "Yeah No", "Feel So Sad", "Angel Baby", "On the Outside" and "B.I.B." were included in the first EP, and the second one was composed of "Outdone", "Leave It On the Flo", "Phonk (Leave It On the Flo, Pt. 2)" and "Smell Good". On August 14, 2020, the third EP, More Fear, was released and consists of seven previously unreleased tracks.

== Track listing ==
Enterfear track listing
No.	Title	Writer(s)	Producer(s)	Length
1.	"Just Die?" (Intro 1)	Aaron D. Yates; Damon Gomez	Dame tha Producer	2:58
2.	"Suckseed (Intro 2)" (featuring Krizz Kaliko and King Iso)	Yates; Samuel Watson; Tarrel Gulledge; Gomez	Dame tha Producer	3:09
3.	"Outdone"	Yates; Michael Summers	Seven	3:17
4.	"Look What I Did" (featuring Flatbush Zombies and Jehry Robinson)	Yates; Antonio Lewis; Demetry Simms; Erick Elliott; Gerald C. Robinson; Summers	Seven	4:20
5.	"Yeah No!" (featuring Mackenzie Nicole)	Yates; Summers	Seven	2:48
6.	"Dr. Sebagh" (featuring Landxn Fyre)	Yates; Landon Fryer; Summers	Seven	3:43
7.	"Question Mark This!" (featuring Krizz Kaliko and Lex Bratcher)	Yates; Watson; Alexis Bratcher; Frederikus van Workum; Nicholas Luscombe	Freek van Workum; ItsNicklus	2:46
8.	"Snake and the Batman / Story Time" (Skit)	Yates; Summers	Seven	1:52
9.	"Feel So Sad!"	Yates; Summers	Seven	3:51
10.	"Leave It On the Flo! Pt. 1" (featuring Landxn Fyre)	Yates; Fryer; Summers; Lucas Parker	Seven	3:20
11.	"Phonk (Leave It On the Flo! Pt. 2)" (featuring Merkules and Scru Face Jean)	Yates; Cole Stevenson; Darrel Ofodirinwa; Summers; Parker	Seven	3:46
12.	"Angel Baby" (featuring Navé Monjo)	Yates; Evan Hancock; Summers; Brooke Winter	Seven	3:15
13.	"On the Outside"	Yates; Summers	Seven	3:34
14.	"Smell Good" (featuring Krizz Kaliko)	Yates; Watson; Summers; Parker	Seven	3:28
15.	"Stoli Doli" (featuring Love, Mae C)	Yates; Summers	Seven	2:41
16.	"For Ya Love" (featuring Marley Young)	Yates; Ray G. Patrick, Jr.; Summers	Seven	3:46
17.	"B.I.B." (featuring Krizz Kaliko)	Yates; Watson; Summers	Seven	2:30
18.	"Saw Somethin'" (featuring Krizz Kaliko and King Iso)	Yates; Watson; Gulledge; Gomez	Dame tha Producer	2:53
19.	"KC Smile" (featuring Krizz Kaliko)	Yates; Watson; van Workum; Luscombe; Hendric Büenck	Freek van Workum; ItsNicklus; HNDRC	2:57
Total length:				60:54

Strange Music pre-order digital bonus track
No.	Title	Writer(s)	Producer(s)	Length
20.	"Feed" (featuring JL)	Yates; Varnes; Gomez	Dame tha Producer	2:45
Total length:				63:39

== Charts ==
Chart performance for Enterfear
Chart (2020)	Peak position
US Billboard 200	92
US Independent Albums (Billboard)	11
