= Good Nights & Bad Mornings 2: The Hangover =

Good Nights and Bad Mornings 2: The Hangover

Mixtape by Snow tha Product
- Released: October 14, 2013
- Genre: Hip hop
- Length: 1:02:54
- Label: WOKE Productions
- Producer: Money Moss, Shane Eli, DK, Arthur McArthur, The Cataracs, Ty Dolla $ign, Sunny Dukes, Cardo, Sunny, Happy Perez, DJ A, Good Goose, Magnificent, ID Labs, SAP, Keise on the Track

Snow tha Product chronology
Good Nights And Bad Mornings (2012)	Good Nights and Bad Mornings 2: The Hangover (2013)

Good Nights and Bad Mornings 2: The Hangover is the sixth mixtape by Mexican-American rapper Snow tha Product. It was released on October 14, 2013, by her independent record label WOKE Productions. Snow Tha Product enlisted the collaborators such as Tech N9ne, Dizzy Wright, Trae tha Truth, Cyhi the Prynce and Ty Dolla $ign, among others.

== Track listing ==
No.	Title	Writer(s)	Producer(s)	Length
1.	"Good Nights"	Claudia Feliciano	Money Moss	2:14
2.	"You're Welcome" (featuring Tech N9ne)	Feliciano, Aaron Yates, Shane "Eli" Abrahams	Shane Eli	2:50
3.	"Play"	Feliciano, Donovan "DK" Knight	DK	3:26
4.	"Bout That Life"	Feliciano, Jeremy "Arthur" McArthur	Arthur McArthur	3:34
5.	"Cali Luv" (featuring The Cataracs)	Feliciano, David Singer-Vine, Niles Hollowell-Dhar	The Cataracs	3:18
6.	"Don't Judge Me" (featuring Ty Dolla $ign)	Feliciano, Tyrone Griffin, Jr.	Ty Dolla $ign	2:09
7.	"Hopeless" (featuring Dizzy Wright)	Feliciano, La'Reonte Wright	Sunny Dukes	3:45
8.	"On Now" (featuring Trae tha Truth)	Feliciano, Frazier Thompson III, Ronald LaTour	Cardo	3:16
9.	"Hold You Down" (featuring Cyhi the Prynce)	Feliciano, Cydel Young	Sunny Dukes	3:57
10.	"Cash Rules"	Feliciano, Nathan "Happy" Perez	Happy Perez	3:38
11.	"Where We Are"	Feliciano, Derek "DJ A" Allen	DJ A	3:38
12.	"Nope" (featuring Riff Raff)	Feliciano, Horst Simco	Good Goose	2:16
13.	"Business Is"	Feliciano, McArthur	Arthur McArthur	2:48
14.	"Hola"	Feliciano	Magnificent	3:02
15.	"Cookie Cutter Bitches"	Feliciano	Money Moss	3:05
16.	"Damn It"	Feliciano	Money Moss	3:16
17.	"Lord Be With You"	Feliciano, Jeremy "Big Jerm" Kulousek, Eric Dan, Zach "Sayez" Vaughan	ID Labs	3:25
18.	"Fuck Your Phone"	Feliciano, Kulousek, Dan, Vaughan	ID Labs	3:13
19.	"I'm Doing Fine"	Feliciano, Kulousek, Dan, Vaughan	ID Labs	3:26
20.	"Fuck Tha Rent"	Feliciano, Jonathan King	SAP	3:16
21.	"Gettin It"	Feliciano	Keise on the Track	2:24
22.	"Bad Mornings"	Feliciano, Kulousek, Dan, Vaughan	ID Labs	4:13

Sample credits

- "Cali Luv" samples "California Love" performed by 2Pac featuring Dr. Dre and Roger Troutman.
- "Don't Judge Me" samples "Creep" performed by TLC.
- "Hold You Down" samples "Lord Hold Me in Your Arms" performed by The Crowns of Glory.
- "Cash Rules" samples "C.R.E.A.M." performed by Wu-Tang Clan.
