= Caribou Lou =

Song by Tech N9ne

from the album Everready (The Religion)
- Released: November 7, 2006
- Genre: Hip-hop
- Length: 4:31
- Label: Strange Music
- Songwriters: Aaron Yates; Samuel Watson; Rune Rask; Troels Nielsen
- Producers: Rune Rask; Troo.L.S.

Audio
- "Caribou Lou" on YouTube

"Caribou Lou" is a song recorded by American rapper Tech N9ne for his fifth studio album, Everready (The Religion) (2006). The song was written by Tech N9ne with its producers Rune Rask and Troo.L.S., with additional writing from Krizz Kaliko. It was released on November 7, 2006, by Strange Music, as the ninth track from Everready (The Religion).

== Background ==
The song is about a party drink called Caribou Lou, which was created by Tech back in 1995. The song quotes the drink's recipe in its lyrics.

== Legacy ==
In May 2018, it was announced that Yates had teamed with Boulevard Brewing Company, a brewery based in his hometown of Kansas City, to create a new beer. The beer was released on June 18 in the Kansas City, Wichita, Denver, and Oklahoma City markets. The beer is named Bou Lou as a reference to the song, which is also a cocktail with overproof rum (The song specifically mentions Bacardi 151, which has been discontinued), Malibu, and pineapple juice. The beer is a wheat beer with pineapple and coconut flavors. On July 9, Bou Lou went on sale in the St. Louis market.

== Reception ==
=== Critical reception ===
XXL put the song on their 30 Most Essential Tech N9ne Songs list.

UrbanMatter ranked the song at number eight on their Top 25 Drinking Songs About Partying Hard and Dancing the Night Away list.

=== Commercial performance ===
The song was certified gold in 2012, and certified platinum later in 2017.

== In popular culture ==
The song appears in the 2006 crime drama film Alpha Dog.

== Certifications ==
Region	Certification	Certified units/sales
New Zealand (RMNZ)	2× Platinum	60,000^{‡}
United States (RIAA)	Platinum	1,000,000^{‡}
^{‡} Sales+streaming figures based on certification alone.
