= K.A.B.O.S.H. =

- Genres: Nu metal; rap metal
- Label: Strange
- Members: Tech N9ne – Krizz Kaliko; Live Band: Dirty Wormz

K.A.B.O.S.H. (Killing American Beliefs On Society's Hoods) is an American nu metal band from Kansas City, Missouri. The current band line up includes Tech N9ne, Krizz Kaliko and the live rock band Dirty Wormz.

The band released their first track called "Little Pills" on the bonus CD "The Strange Music Library" that came with the purchase of Tech N9ne's Everready (The Religion). Since then, there has been much anticipation for their debut album rumored to be titled Amafrican Psycho. In a 2011 interview on Tech N9ne's blog, he stated that work should begin soon, with the release of Klusterfuk and Welcome to Strangeland complete. Tech has confirmed that the first song "God of Waar" has been completed. "God of Waar" was released on Oct. 1, 2012.

Tech N9ne has stated in a recent interview with Montreality promoting his new album Something Else that the K.A.B.O.S.H. album has been put on hold. He instead released Therapy, a fully metal EP, on November 5, 2013. Tech N9ne has recently stated that the fate of K.A.B.O.S.H. would be based on the reaction to his new rock influenced EP.

== Band members ==
- Tech N9ne – Vocals
- Krizz Kaliko – Vocals
- Dirty Wormz - Live Rock Instrumentals

== Discography ==
Studio albums

- Amafrican Psycho (Cancelled)

Songs

- Little Pills
- God of Waar
