= Planet (Tech N9ne album) =

Studio album by Tech N9ne
- Released: March 2, 2018
- Studio: Gordon James Productions (Lynnwood, WA); Monjo Land Studio (Kenner, LA); Teesdale Recording Studio (North Hollywood, CA); The Jam Studios (North Hollywood, CA); Strangeland Studios; The Boulevard
- Genre: Hip hop
- Length: 1:04:22
- Label: Strange Music
- Producer: Travis O'Guin (exec.); Dem Jointz; Derek Anderson; Gerald Calliste, Jr.; Jeffery James; Jordan Omley; Joseph Bishara; Michael Mani; Mr. Porter; Seven; Suli4Q

Tech N9ne chronology
Strange Reign (2017)	Planet (2018)	N9na (2019)

Professional ratings
Review scores
Source	Rating
AllMusic	3.5/5 stars
HipHopDX	3.9/5

Planet is the twentieth studio album by American rapper Tech N9ne. It was released on March 2, 2018, via Strange Music. The album features guest appearances from Jordan Omley, Krizz Kaliko, Navé Monjo, Machine Gun Kelly, Mackenzie Nicole and Snow Tha Product, among others.

== Track listing ==
Standard edition
No.	Title	Producer(s)	Length
1.	"Habanero" (featuring Mackenzie Nicole)	Seven	3:05
2.	"Fresh Out!" (featuring Swisher Sleep)	Mr. Porter	3:07
3.	"Kick It with Myself"	Seven	3:07
4.	"Drink Up"	Seven	3:12
5.	"Don't Nobody Want None"	Seven; Gerald Calliste, Jr.	2:59
6.	"Bad JuJu" (featuring King Iso)	Seven	3:06
7.	"Comfortable"	Seven	3:14
8.	"No Reason (The Mosh Pit Song)" (featuring Machine Gun Kelly and Y2)	Derek Anderson; Jeffery James	3:59
9.	"Brightfall Confession"	Seven; Joseph Bishara	0:48
10.	"Brightfall"	Seven; Joseph Bishara	4:52
11.	"Red Byers (Say Som'n Do Som'n)" (featuring Krizz Kaliko)	Seven	3:21
12.	"Never Stray" (featuring Navé Monjo)	Seven	3:42
13.	"Sho Nuff"	Dem Jointz	3:37
14.	"How I'm Feelin'" (featuring Snow Tha Product and Navé Monjo)	Seven	3:16
15.	"Not a Damn Thing"	Dem Jointz	3:09
16.	"My Fault" (featuring Navé Monjo)	Seven	3:56
17.	"Tappin' In" (featuring Darrein Safron and Joey Cool)	Seven	4:14
18.	"Levitation" (featuring Navé Monjo)	Seven	3:07
19.	"We Won't Go Quietly" (featuring Jordan Omley)	Michael Mani; Jordan Omley	4:31

Strange Music physical pre-order bonus track
No.	Title	Producer(s)	Length
20.	"Planet" (featuring Suli4Q)	Suli4Q	4:01

== Charts ==
Chart (2018)	Peak position
Canadian Albums (Billboard)	38
US Billboard 200	14
US Top R&B/Hip-Hop Albums (Billboard)	9
US Top Rap Albums (Billboard)	7
US Digital Albums (Billboard)	5
US Independent Albums (Billboard)	1
US Indie Store Album Sales (Billboard)	5
