= Before I Crash Out =

Before I Crashout

Studio album by Snow Tha Product
- Released: 2025
- Studio: Independent
- Genres: Hip-hop, R&B, mariachi, cumbia
- Label: Independent

Before I Crashout is a studio album by Mexican-American rap icon Snow Tha Product (born Claudia Alexandra Madriz Meza), released on December 12, 2025. The album marked her first full-length studio release since 2022's To Anywhere. The project is described as a sprawling release—containing between 26 and 30 tracks—that sonically blends hip-hop with R&B, mariachi, and cumbia.

== Background and themes ==
The title of the album refers to the slang term "crashing out", which describes an overemotional reaction to current events. Snow Tha Product has noted that the "before" in the title is significant, representing the process of meditation and maintaining composure and maturity before reaching a breaking point. The artist has stated the album serves as an outlet to express emotions regarding the current state of the world, including politics, relationships, and the struggles of adulthood.

The album explores themes central to the artist's identity, including her experience as a queer woman, being a first-generation daughter of formerly undocumented parents, and being neurodivergent. Much of the lyrical content focuses on political commentary, specifically targeting the MAGA movement, anti-immigrant sentiments, and the hypocrisy of certain demographics within the Latino community regarding ICE and political affiliations.

== Composition and lyrics ==
The album features a diverse range of musical styles, from rap and hip-hop to traditional Mexican genres like mariachi and cumbia. Notable tracks include:

- "Sábado": A track addressing the political divide within families, specifically concerning family members who support former President Donald Trump.
- "Mad at Me Again": A song that addresses repatriation to Mexico and critiques the MAGA community's stance on mass deportation.
- "M.A.M.A": An uplifting track intended to venerate Latinas.
- "She Wasnt Home": A track highlighting the theme of abuse faced by teenage girls within their households.
- "Sola Otra Vez": A song exploring the solitude associated with accepting one's own neurodivergence.
- "Sorry X Tus Suegros": A somber departure addressing the theme of homophobic parents in the LGBTQ and Latin American communities.

The album also revisits earlier works, including the track "Faith", which had originally appeared on a semi-unreleased mixtape, and several of its hits were released previously as singles and EPs earlier in 2025.

== Release and promotion ==
The album was released independently on December 12, 2025, coinciding with the Day of the Virgin of Guadalupe. Following its release, Snow Tha Product went on a national tour in 2026, which began on March 19 in Riverside, California.

== See also ==
Snow Tha Product discography
