= Everready (The Religion) =

Studio album by Tech N9ne
- Released: November 7, 2006
- Recorded: 2002–06
- Genre: Hip-hop
- Length: 1:15:56 (Disc 1); 69:54 (Disc 2); 145:40 (Total)
- Label: Strange Music
- Producers: Rick Rock; The Legendary Traxster; Robert Rebeck; Seven; Rune Rask & Troo.L.S.; Tha Bizness; Polyhedron; Da Riffs; TyJilla; Tech N9ne

Tech N9ne chronology
| Vintage Tech (2005) | Everready (The Religion) (2006) | Misery Loves Kompany (2007) |

Singles from Everready (The Religion)
- 1. "Bout Ta' Bubble" Released: October 20, 2006

Professional ratings
Review scores
| Source | Rating |
|---|---|
| Allmusic | 3.5/5 stars |
| RapReviews | 8.0/10 |

Everready (The Religion) is the fifth studio album by rapper Tech N9ne. The album was released in 2006 as a "Collector's Edition" CD that contains a second CD featuring 14 songs from Tech N9ne as well as other Strange Music artists. "Jellysickle" & "My Wife, My Bitch, My Girl" also appeared on the 25 To Life video game soundtrack, while a censored version of "The Beast" was featured on the soundtrack to Madden NFL 06, released in 2005. In 2010, the song "Riot Maker" was used by Total Nonstop Action Wrestling (TNA) as the official theme for their Hard Justice pay-per-view. The album debuted at #50 on the Billboard 200 with 22,000 copies sold in its first week. The song "Caribou Lou" was later certified Gold in 2012, and certified platinum later in 2017.

Eminem was originally set to appear on the track "My World" with Tech N9ne and Brotha Lynch but complications with his best friend Proof being killed led him to not being able to record his verse, so Dalima took over his spot on the album. Twista was originally supposed to appear on "Welcome To The Midwest," but his recorded verse wasn't sent to Tech in time to be fully mastered without delaying the album. Tech says he still plans to use the verse in the future.

== Track listing ==
=== Disc one ===
| No. | Title | Writer(s) | Producer(s) | Length |
|---|---|---|---|---|
| 1. | "Enter Everready" | | | 1:56 |
| 2. | "Riot Maker" (featuring Skatterman & Snug Brim) | Aaron Yates; Samuel Watson; Aaron Henderson; Stacy Landis | Tech N9ne; Rob Rebeck; Tyler Lyon | 5:32 |
| 3. | "No Can Do" (featuring Krizz Kaliko) | Yates; Watson | Rick Rock | 3:56 |
| 4. | "Welcome to the Midwest" (featuring Krizz Kaliko) | Yates; Watson | Tha Bizness | 3:15 |
| 5. | "Bout Ta' Bubble" (backup vocals by Krizz Kaliko) | Yates | Seven | 3:30 |
| 6. | "It's What You Thinkin'" (backup vocals by Krizz Kaliko) | Yates | Seven | 3:47 |
| 7. | "Night and Day" (backup vocals by Krizz Kaliko) | Yates | Seven | 4:15 |
| 8. | "Jellysickle" (featuring E-40, backup vocals by Krizz Kaliko) | Yates | Rick Rock | 3:37 |
| 9. | "Caribou Lou" (featuring Krizz Kaliko) | Yates; Watson | Rune Rask; Troo.L.S. | 4:31 |
| 10. | "Hood Connection (Strange Commercial)" | | | 1:51 |
| 11. | "My Wife, My Bitch, My Girl" | Yates | Rick Rock | 3:40 |
| 12. | "Flash" (featuring Krizz Kaliko) | Yates; Watson; Melvin Calhoun | Rune Rask; Troo.L.S. | 3:53 |
| 13. | "Come Gangsta" | Yates; Watson | Seven | 5:35 |
| 14. | "The Melancholy Maze & My World Intro" | Yates | | 1:25 |
| 15. | "My World" (featuring Brotha Lynch Hung & Dalima) | Yates; Kevin Mann; Reginald Easterwood | The Legendary Traxster | 4:37 |
| 16. | "Running Out of Time (R.O.O.T.)" | Yates; Watson | Seven | 3:43 |
| 17. | "The Rain" (featuring Alyia Yates & Reign Yates) | Yates; Watson; Queen | Polyhedron | 4:20 |
| 18. | "Fuck'em Girl" (featuring Krizz Kaliko & Kutt Calhoun) | Yates; Watson; Calhoun | Seven | 4:10 |
| 19. | "The Beast" (featuring Krizz Kaliko) | Yates | Da Riffs | 3:40 |
| 20. | "This Is Me" (backup vocals by Krizz Kaliko) | Yates; Watson | TyJilla | 4:44 |
| Total length: | | | | 75:58 |

=== Disc two: Strange Music Library ===
| No. | Title | Writer(s) | Producer(s) | Length |
|---|---|---|---|---|
| 1. | "Intro" | Yates | | 1:14 |
| 2. | "That Owl" (backup vocals by Krizz Kaliko) | Yates; Watson | Seven | 5:38 |
| 3. | "In My Head" (featuring Krizz Kaliko) | Yates | Mista Royce | 4:56 |
| 4. | "Groupie" (featuring Krizz Kaliko & Kutt Calhoun) | Yates; Watson; Calhoun | Big Tank | 6:22 |
| 5. | "Rock Like That" (performed by Critical Bill) | Davis; Scott; Causley; Thacker; Sawyer | Critical Bill; Rob Rebeck | 3:57 |
| 6. | "The Shouting" (performed by Critical Bill) | Davis; Scott; Causley; Thacker; Sawyer | Critical Bill; Rob Rebeck | 4:15 |
| 7. | "Don't Blame Me" (performed by Skatterman & Snug Brim featuring Boy Big) | Landis; Henderson | Walter Canady; Raw Beats | 3:42 |
| 8. | "Run" (performed by Skatterman & Snug Brim) | Landis; Henderson | Preston Middleton | 5:40 |
| 9. | "Whip It" (performed by Kutt Calhoun featuring Tech N9ne) | Calhoun; Yates | Seven | 4:40 |
| 10. | "Playa Like Me" (performed by Kutt Calhoun featuring Krizz Kaliko) | Calhoun | Seven | 4:49 |
| 11. | "Trapped" (performed by Project: Deadman {Prozak & Mike E. Clark}) | Shippy | Mike E. Clark | 4:40 |
| 12. | "Holy War" (performed by Project: Deadman) | Shippy; Clark | Mike E. Clark | 4:53 |
| 13. | "Let It Go" (performed by Krizz Kaliko) | Watson | Seven | 4:58 |
| 14. | "The Need" (performed by Krizz Kaliko) | Watson | Seven | 6:18 |
| 15. | "Little Pills" (performed by K.A.B.O.S.H. {Tech N9ne, Krizz Kaliko & Dirty Wormz}) | Yates; Watson | Rob Rebeck | 4:03 |
| Total length: | | | | 70:05 |

=== Bonus tracks ===
| No. | Title | Writer(s) | Length |
|---|---|---|---|
| 1. | "Sleeping Beauty^{1}" (featuring Krizz Kaliko) | A. Yates | 5:09 |

- ^1Copies purchased from Trans World Entertainment-owned stores contained a promotional code allowing the download of this track for free.

== Samples ==
No Can Do

- "I Can't Go For That (No Can Do)" by Hall & Oates

Welcome to the Midwest

- "Sway" by Dean Martin

Bout Ta' Bubble

- "Beat Box II" by Art Of Noise

The Rain

- "Rain" (from the Cowboy Bebop soundtrack) by Yoko Kanno & The Seatbelts

== Charts ==
| Chart (2006) | Peak position |
|---|---|
| US Billboard 200 | 50 |
| US Independent Albums | 2 |
| US Top R&B/Hip-Hop Albums | 23 |
| US Top Rap Albums | 11 |

== Certifications ==
| Region | Certification | Certified units/sales |
|---|---|---|
| United States (RIAA) | Gold | 500,000^{‡} |
^{‡} Sales+streaming figures based on certification alone.

== Release history ==
Release dates and formats for Everready (The Religion)
| Region | Date | Format(s) | Label |
|---|---|---|---|
| Various | November 7, 2006 | Digital download; streaming | Strange Music |
