= David Doman =

American electrical engineer

David Doman is an electrical engineer with the USAF Air Force Research Laboratory in Rome, New York. He was named a Fellow of the Institute of Electrical and Electronics Engineers (IEEE) in 2016 for his contributions to flight dynamics and control.
