= Half Way There... Pt. 1 =

Mixtape by Snow tha Product
- Released: June 17, 2016
- Recorded: 2016
- Genre: Hip hop; R&B
- Length: 21:11
- Label: Atlantic Records
- Producer: Arthur McArthur, Focus…, DJ Pumba, David Doman

Snow tha Product chronology
The Rest Comes Later (2015)	Half Way There... Pt. 1 (2016)

Half Way There... Pt. 1 is a commercial mixtape by rapper Snow tha Product. It was released on June 17, 2016.

== Track listing ==
No.	Title	Writer(s)	Producer(s)	Length
1.	"No Cut"	Claudia Feliciano	Focus...	3:58
2.	"Nights" (featuring W. Darling)	Feliciano	Arthur McArthur	4:00
3.	"Too Much (Interlude)"	Feliciano		0:55
4.	"Get Down Low" (featuring Ohana Bam)	Feliciano	David Doman	3:27
5.	"Alright" (featuring PnB Rock)	Feliciano	Cuddy on the Beat	3:18
6.	"Too Much to Take (Interlude)"	Feliciano		1:00
7.	"Nuestra Cancion"	Feliciano	DJ Pumba	3:13
8.	"Not Tonight"	Feliciano		2:40
Total length:				21:11

== Charts ==
Chart (2016)	Peak position
US Heatseekers Albums (Billboard)	9
US Top Rap Albums (Billboard)	13
