= Unorthodox (Snow Tha Product album) =

Studio album by Snow Tha Product
- Released: October 26, 2011
- Genre: Hip hop, pop rap
- Length: 49:23
- Label: Street Science, Product ENT.
- Producer: Omeguh, Redhook Noodles, Pumba, Superstar O, Essay Potna, Hannibal Hector (of The Nominees), AR Beats, Keise on da Track, Smoke Beatz

Snow Tha Product chronology
Unorthodox (2011)	Good Nights and Bad Mornings (2012)

Unorthodox is the debut studio album by Mexican-American rapper Snow Tha Product. It was released on October 26, 2011, by her independently incorporated affiliated record labels Street Science Entertainment and Product ENT. The album was preceded by the release of her second mixtape, titled Unorthodox 0.5, with DJ Whoo Kid. The songs are: I'ma Make It, Unorthodox, I'm All That, Woke Wednesday, Good Girls, Like That, and more songs.

== Track listing ==
All tracks were written by Snow tha Product.

No.	Title	Producer(s)	Length
1.	"I'ma Make It"	Omeguh	1:36
2.	"Unorthodox"	Redhook Noodles	2:19
3.	"I'm All That"	Pumba	3:33
4.	"Woke Wednesday"	Superstar O	2:30
5.	"Good Girls"	Essay Potna	3:31
6.	"Like That"	Pumba	3:42
7.	"Holy Shit"	Hannibal Hector (of The Nominees)	1:37
8.	"Vaquero"	Pumba	1:35
9.	"Drunk Love (Remix)"	Pumba	3:20
10.	"I Bet You Won't"	AR Beats	3:09
11.	"Nothing Nice"		3:14
12.	"Beast Mode"	Hannibal Hector (of The Nominess)	1:22
13.	"High Definition"	Keise on da Track	3:58
14.	"Telemundo"	Snow tha Product	3:22
15.	"Hey Girl"	Smoke Beatz	2:47
16.	"Till Death"	Essay Potna	4:16
17.	"Maria Felix"	Pumba	3:32
Total length:			49:23
