= To Anywhere =

Studio album by Snow Tha Product
- Released: October 21, 2022
- Genre: Latin; hip-hop; Dembow
- Length: 43:47
- Language: English; Spanish
- Label: Product Entertainment
- Producer: Claudia Meza; DJA; D Tenox; Seuss; Pierre Balian; Rojas On The Beat; DJ Pumba

Snow Tha Product chronology
Half Way There... Pt. 1 (2016)	To Anywhere (2022)

Singles from To Anywhere
- 1. "Uh Huh" Released: August 17, 2022; 2. "Piña" Released: September 9, 2022

To Anywhere is the second studio album by Mexican American rapper Snow Tha Product. It was released on October 21, 2022, by Product Entertainment. The album includes collaborations with Mexican artist Santa Fe Klan, Puertorician artist vF7, rapper Juicy J, Dominican dembow artist Ceky Vicini, former Fifth Harmony member Lauren Jauregui, Rotimi, and labelmate AJ Hernz. The album contains lyrics in both Spanish and English.

== Background ==
Months before the album’s release, Snow Tha Product announced that she had previously worked on songs that remained unreleased for several years. She said that some of the songs were from her time with her former label, and that she had to fight to get them released. She also stated that "It's all over the place, but that's also true to who I am," regarding the album's concept. The song on the album Piña (featuring Lauren Jauregui) was one of the songs she had worked on which was initially to had feature "Mariah Angeliq". Although at the end, Snow knew that the one that fit the vision for the song was Lauren.

On January 25, 2023, Snow Tha Product announced the dates for the "Quince I Never Had Tour." This was to promote the album with various special guests in the United States.

== Singles ==
The first single from the album was "Uh Huh." The official audio of the song was released on her YouTube channel on August 17, 2022.

The second single from the album was "Piña," featuring Lauren Jauregui, released on September 9, 2022. The music video was released on December 9, 2022.

An official music video for "Bájala" dropped on January 6, 2023.

== Reception ==
To Anywhere was number 45 on Rolling Stone's 50 Best Spanish-Language Albums of 2022.

== Track listing ==
To Anywhere track listing
No.	Title	Writer(s)	Producer(s)	Length
1.	"There We Are" (Intro)	Claudia Alexandra Madriz Meza	Claudia Alexandra Madriz Meza; DJA	0:40
2.	"Waves"	Claudia Meza; Alvaro Jesus Rincon; Jose Alberto Morales	Claudia Meza	2:40
3.	"Bájala" (featuring Santa Fe Klan)	Claudia Meza; Angel Quezada Jasso; Jose Alberto Morales	Claudia Meza	2:18
4.	"Ranchito"	Claudia Meza	Claudia Meza	0:48
5.	"Cash Cash" (featuring vf7)	Claudia Meza	Claudia Meza	3:38
6.	"Not Today" (featuring Juicy J)	Claudia Meza	Claudia Meza	2:28
7.	"Butter, Pt. 2"	Claudia Meza	Claudia Meza	2:51
8.	"Tulum"	Claudia Meza	Claudia Meza	3:31
9.	"Sola" (featuring Ceky Viciny)	Claudia Meza	Claudia Meza	2:49
10.	"Piña" (featuring Lauren Jauregui))	Claudia Meza; Lauren Jauregui	Claudia Meza; D Tenox; Seuss; Pierre Balian; Rojas On The Beat	2:24
11.	"De Muestro" (featuring Rotimi))	Claudia Meza	Claudia Meza	4:05
12.	"Avioncito"	Claudia Meza	Claudia Meza	2:48
13.	"Jarabe"	Claudia Meza	Claudia Meza	2:38
14.	"Uh Huh"	Claudia Meza	Claudia Meza; G.O.K.B; Jay P Does It	2:43
15.	"No Hay Mas"	Claudia Meza	Claudia Meza	3:25
16.	"For Real" (featuring AJ Hernz))	Claudia Meza	Claudia Meza; DJ Pumba	3:39
Total length:				43:47

== Release history ==
Region	Date	Label	Format
United States	October 21, 2022	Product Entertainment	CD, digital download
