= King Iso =

- Born: Tarrel Gulledge; September 10, 1989 (age 36)
- Origin: Omaha, Nebraska, United States
- Genres: Hip hop
- Occupations: Rapper; singer; songwriter; Producer
- Years active: 2007–present
- Label: Strange
- Website: strangemusicinc.com

Terrell Gulledge (born Tarrel Gulledge, September 10, 1989), better known by his stage name King Iso (formerly ISO and Reali-T), is an American rapper from Omaha, Nebraska. He is currently signed to Tech N9ne's label Strange Music and is known for his collaborations with Tech N9ne, such as on the song "Face Off".

Before his career in music, Gulledge struggled with homelessness and was put in prison multiple times as well as a mental institution. His stage name "Iso" stands for "I shall overcome" and was inspired by the name of the solitary confinement chamber he was placed in while admitted in the institution. These struggles inspired much of the content in his songs, which heavily focus on mental health.

Iso was formerly signed to Twisted Insane's label Brainsick Muzik, before moving to Strange Music. In 2020, he released his first album under Strange Music, World War Me. His 2022 album Get Well Soon was met with positive reception from critics. In October 2023, he released the album iLLdren, containing features from Tech N9ne and X-Raided among others. The single "Way You Are" off the album discusses autism, which was inspired by Gulledge's son.

== Discography ==
=== Albums ===
- The Insanity Plea (2015)
- Autophobia (2016)
- DeMenTia (2018)
- World War Me (2020)
- Get Well Soon (2022)
- 8PM Med Call (2022)
- iLLdren (2023)
- Ghetto Psycho (2025)

=== EPs ===
- 8 P.M. Med Call (2022)

Mixtapes

- The Reali-T Show (as Reali-T) (2007)
- The Throw-Away Glock (as Reali-T) (2009)
- Project "ISO" EP (as Reali-T) (2013)
- The T-Virus (as Reali-T) (2013)
- The With'draw'al (as ISO) (2013)
- Different (as ISO) (2013)
- Different Disk 2 (as ISO) (2013)
- Different 3 (as ISO) (2013)
- Enemy of the State (Different 4) (as ISO) (2013)
- Venom (as ISO) (2014)
- IKON (as ISO) (2014)
- DVFFERENT (2025)
