= Tech N9ne discography =

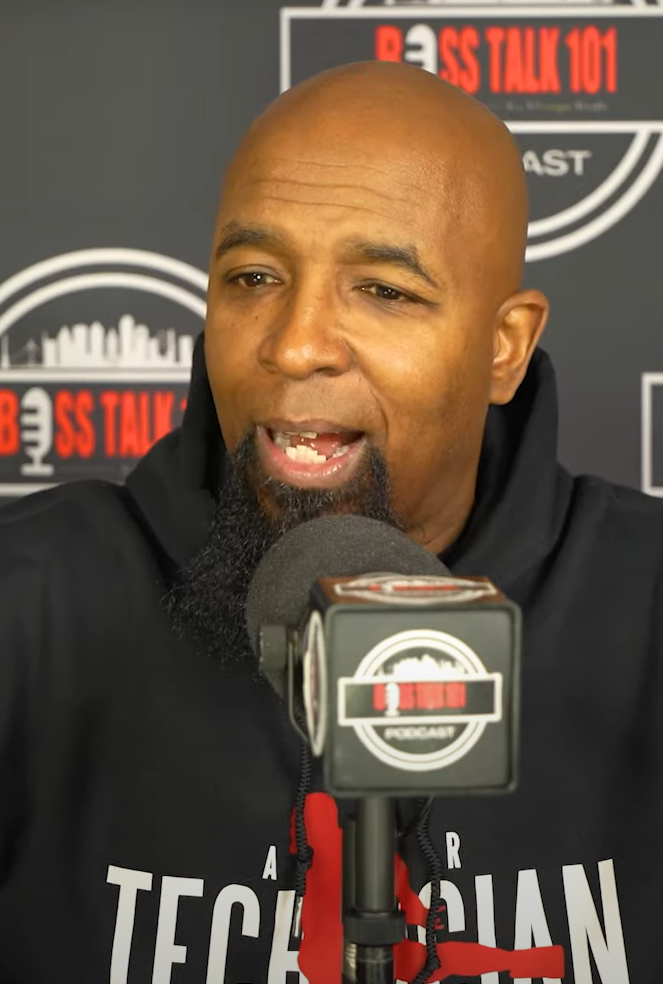
- Tech N9ne in 2025
- Studio albums: 24
- Extended plays: 9
- Soundtrack albums: 5
- Compilation albums: 3
- Singles: 67
- Music videos: 113
- Mixtapes: 1
- Documentaries: 4
- Guest appearances: 409

The discography of American rapper and singer Tech N9ne spans over 29 years, with the earliest official release being the single release "Cloudy-Eyed Stroll/Mitch Bade" in 1996. Tech N9ne has SoundScanned over two million albums independently. He has also had his music featured in many movies, television shows, and video games.

== Albums ==
=== Studio albums ===
==== Tech N9ne ====
List of albums, with selected chart positions and sales figures
Title	Album details	Peak chart positions					Sales	Certifications
Title	Album details	US	US Ind.	US R&B/HH	US Rap	CAN	Sales	Certifications
The Calm Before the Storm	Released: November 9, 1999; Label: Midwestside; Format: CD, digital download	—	—	—	—	—	US: 21,000	
The Worst	Released: September 12, 2000; Label: Midwestside; Format: CD, digital download	—	—	—	—	—	US: 12,000	
Anghellic^{[note]}	Released: August 28, 2001; Label: Strange Music, JCOR; Format: CD, cassette, digital download	59	46	50	—	—	US: 278,000	
Absolute Power	Released: September 24, 2002; Label: Strange Music; Format: CD, digital download	79	3	28	—	—	US: 358,000	RIAA: Gold
Everready (The Religion)	Released: November 7, 2006; Label: Strange Music; Format: CD, digital download	50	2	23	11	—	US: 264,000	RIAA: Gold
Killer	Released: July 1, 2008; Label: Strange Music; Format: CD, digital download	12	1	8	6	58	US: 180,000	
K.O.D.	Released: October 26, 2009; Label: Strange Music; Format: CD, digital download	14	1	7	3	—	US: 159,000	
All 6's and 7's	Released: June 7, 2011; Label: Strange Music; Format: CD, digital download	4	1	1	1	24	US: 230,000	
Something Else	Released: July 30, 2013; Label: Strange Music; Format: CD, LP, digital download	4	2	2	2	10	US: 92,000	
Special Effects	Released: May 4, 2015; Label: Strange Music; Format: CD, LP, digital download	4	1	1	1	7	US: 66,087	
The Storm	Released: December 9, 2016; Label: Strange Music; Format: CD, digital download	12	3	4	3	39	US: 36,851	
Planet	Released: March 2, 2018; Label: Strange Music; Format: CD, digital download	14	1	9	7	38	US: 21,000	
N9NA	Released: April 19, 2019; Label: Strange Music; Format: CD, digital download	34	3	21	19	—		
Enterfear	Released: April 17, 2020; Label: Strange Music; Format: CD, digital download	92	—	—	—	—		
Asin9ne	Released: October 8, 2021; Label: Strange Music; Format: CD, digital download	82	—	41	—	—		
Bliss	Released: July 14, 2023; Label: Strange Music; Format: CD, digital download	—	—	—	—	—		
5816 Forest	Released: June 27, 2025; Label: Strange Music; Format: CD, digital download	—	—	—	—	—		

Studio albums notes

1. This listing combines the numbers of both the original 2001 release, Anghellic, as well as the 2003 re-release, Anghellic: Reparation. The peak position on the Independent Chart comes from the re-release, while the other positions are those of the original. As of July 29, 2009, the original release has sold 82,700 or more copies, while the re-release has sold 180,520 or more copies. The number in the table is a collective total between the two releases.

==== Tech N9ne Collabos ====
List of albums, with selected chart positions and sales figures
Title	Album details	Peak chart positions					Sales	Certifications
Title	Album details	US	US Ind.	US R&B/HH	US Rap	CAN	Sales	Certifications
Misery Loves Kompany	Released: July 17, 2007; Label: Strange Music; Format: CD, digital download	49	3	23	7	—	US: 106,000	
Sickology 101	Released: April 28, 2009; Label: Strange Music; Format: CD, digital download	19	2	12	6	—	US: 118,000	
The Gates Mixed Plate	Released: July 27, 2010; Label: Strange Music; Format: CD, digital download	13	1	5	4	—	US: 73,000	
Welcome to Strangeland	Released: November 8, 2011; Label: Strange Music; Format: CD, digital download	21	3	4	4	—	US: 84,000	
Strangeulation	Released: May 6, 2014; Label: Strange Music; Format: CD, LP, digital download	5	1	1	1	—	US: 36,000	
Strangeulation Vol. II	Released: November 20, 2015; Label: Strange Music; Format: CD, LP, digital download	25	1	4	3	57	US: 23,969	
Dominion	Released: April 7, 2017; Label: Strange Music; Format: CD, digital download	28	5	16	13	—		
Strange Reign	Released: October 13, 2017; Label: Strange Music; Format: CD, digital download	61	—	—	—	—		
COSM	Released: July 12, 2024; Label: Strange Music; Format: CD, digital download	—	—	—	—	—		

=== Compilation albums ===
List of Compilations, with selected chart positions and sales figures
Title	Album details	Peak chart positions		Sales
Title	Album details	US Ind	US R&B	Sales
Celcius	Released: September 2002; Label: Midwestside; Format: CD, digital download	—	—	
Vintage Tech	Released: March 22, 2005; Label: Strange Music; Format: CD	19	63	US: 89,000
Tech N9ne: The Box Set	Released: October 13, 2009; Label: Strange Music; Format: Digital download	—	—	
"—" denotes a recording that did not chart.

== Extended plays ==
List of extended plays, with selected chart positions and sales figures
Title	EP details	Peak chart positions					Sales
Title	EP details	US	US Ind	US R&B	US Rap	CAN	Sales
The Lost Scripts of K.O.D.	Released: March 30, 2010; Label: Strange Music; Format: CD, digital download	117	9	31	13	—	
Seepage	Released: October 25, 2010; Label: Strange Music; Format: CD, digital download	57	5	10	6	—	
Klusterfuk	Released: March 13, 2012; Label: Strange Music; Format: CD, digital download	15	1	4	3	79	US: 20,000
E.B.A.H.	Released: September 18, 2012; Label: Strange Music; Format: CD, digital download	31	5	4	3	—	US: 16,000
Boiling Point	Released: October 30, 2012; Label: Strange Music; Format: CD, digital download	30	4	5	3	—	
Therapy	Released: November 5, 2013; Label: Strange Music; Format: CD, digital download	32	5	4	6	—	
Enterfear Level 1	Released: November 22, 2019; Label: Strange Music; Format: Digital download	29	—	—	—	—	
Enterfear Level 2	Released: January 17, 2020; Label: Strange Music; Format: Digital download	—	—	—	—	—	
More Fear	Released: August 14, 2020; Label: Strange Music; Format: Digital download	—	—	—	—	—	
Fear Exodus	Released: October 23, 2020; Label: Strange Music; Format: Digital download	—	—	—	—	—	
Blight (with Hu$h)	Released: June 4, 2021; Label: Strange Music; Format: Digital download	—	—	—	—	—	
Siqnaling the Siqly (with Nnutthowze)	Released: October 31, 2023; Label: Strange Music; Format: CD, digital download	—	—	—	—	—	
"—" denotes a recording that did not chart.

== Mixtapes ==
List of mixtapes, with selected chart positions and sales figures
Title	Mixtape details	Peak chart positions				Sales
Title	Mixtape details	US	US Ind	US R&B	US Rap	Sales
Bad Season	Released: December 23, 2010; Label: Strange Music; Format: CD, digital download	118	13	28	15	US: 4,400

== Documentaries ==
Year	DVD details	Peak chart positions	Sales
Year	DVD details	Billboard Top Music Video	Sales
2004	T9X: The Tech N9ne Experience: Released: July 27, 2004; Label: Strange Music, MSC; Format: DVD	—	US: 13,148
2008	The Psychumentary: Released: April 8, 2008; Label: Strange Music; Format: DVD	7	US: 8,826
2009	Strictly Strange: Released: September 22, 2009; Label: Strange Music; Format: DVD	—	
2010	K.O.D. Tour (Live in Kansas City): Released: May 18, 2010; Label: Strange Music; Format: DVD and Blu-ray	—	
"—" indicates releases that did not chart.

== Singles ==
=== As lead artist ===
List of singles, with year released, selected chart positions and certifications, and album name shown
Title	Year	Peak chart positions						Certifications	Album
Title	Year	US	US R&B/HH	US Rap	US Rhythmic	AUS	CAN	Certifications	Album
"Mitch Bade"	1996	—	—	—	—	—	—		Cloudy-Eyed Stroll / Mitch Bade (Note: "Mitch Bade" later appears on Tech's debut album The Calm Before the Storm as "Mitchell Bade".)
"Cloudy-Eyed Stroll"	1996	—	—	—	—	—	—		Cloudy-Eyed Stroll / Mitch Bade
"Soul Searchin"	1997	—	—	—	—	—	—		Soul Searchin' / Big Bad Wolf
"Big Bad Wolf"	1997	—	—	—	—	—	—		Soul Searchin' / Big Bad Wolf
"It's Alive"	2001	—	—	—	—	—	—		Anghellic
"Slacker"	2002	—	—	—	—	67	—		Absolute Power
"Imma Tell"	2003	—	—	—	—	—	—		Absolute Power
"Here Comes Tecca Nina"	2004	—	—	—	40	—	—		Absolute Power
"I'm a Playa" (featuring Krizz Kaliko)	2004	—	—	—	—	—	—		Absolute Power
"Bout Ta' Bubble"	2006	—	—	—	—	—	—		Everready (The Religion)
"Caribou Lou"	2006	—	—	—	—	—	—	RIAA: Platinum; RMNZ: 2× Platinum	Everready (The Religion)
"Midwest Choppers" (featuring D-Loc, Dalima and Krizz Kaliko)	2007	—	—	—	—	—	—		Misery Loves Kompany
"Gangsta Shap" (featuring Krizz Kaliko and Kutt Calhoun)	2007	—	—	—	—	—	—		Misery Loves Kompany
"Everybody Move"	2008	—	—	—	—	—	—		Killer
"Like Yeah"	2008	—	—	—	—	—	—		Killer
"Red Nose"	2009	—	—	—	—	—	—		Sickology 101
"Sickology 101" (featuring Chino XL and Crooked I)	2009	—	—	—	—	—	—		Sickology 101
"Nothin'" (featuring Big Scoob and Messy Marv)	2009	—	—	—	—	—	—		Sickology 101
"Leave Me Alone"	2009	—	—	—	—	—	—		K.O.D.
"Show Me a God"	2009	—	—	—	—	—	—		K.O.D.
"Strange Music Box" (featuring Brotha Lynch Hung and Krizz Kaliko)	2009	—	—	—	—	—	—		K.O.D.
"Low"	2009	—	—	—	—	—	—		K.O.D.
"O.G."	2010	—	—	—	—	—	—		The Gates Mixed Plate
"Jumpin' Jax" (featuring Bishop Young Don, Stevie Stone and Krizz Kaliko)	2010	—	—	—	—	—	—		The Gates Mixed Plate
"KC Tea"	2010	—	—	—	—	—	—		The Gates Mixed Plate
"Worldwide Choppers" (featuring Busta Rhymes, Ceza, D-Loc, JL of B. Hood, Twista, Twisted Insane, U$O and Yelawolf)	2011	— (Note: "Worldwide Choppers" did not enter the Billboard Hot 100, but peaked at number four on the Bubbling Under Hot 100 chart.)	—	—	—	—	—	RIAA: Platinum	All 6's and 7's
"He's a Mental Giant"	2011	—	—	—	—	—	—		All 6's and 7's
"Mama Nem"	2011	—	—	—	—	—	—		All 6's and 7's
"Love Me Tomorrow" (featuring Big Scoob)	2011	—	—	—	—	—	—		All 6's and 7's
"The Noose" (featuring ¡Mayday!)	2011	—	—	—	—	—	—		Welcome to Strangeland
"Am I a Psycho?" (featuring B.o.B and Hopsin)	2012	—	—	—	—	—	—	RIAA: Platinum; RMNZ: Gold	All 6's and 7's
"Blur"	2012	—	—	—	—	—	—		Klusterfuk
"Don't Tweet This"	2012	—	—	—	—	—	—		E.B.A.H.
"URALYA"	2012	—	—	—	—	—	—		Boiling Point
"Alone"	2012	—	—	—	—	—	—		Boiling Point
"B.I.T.C.H." (featuring T-Pain)	2013	—	—	—	—	—	—		Something Else
"So Dope (They Wanna)" (featuring Wrekonize, Twisted Insane and Snow Tha Product)	2013	—	—	—	—	—	—		Something Else
"Fragile" (featuring Kendrick Lamar, ¡Mayday! and Kendall Morgan)	2013	— (Note: "Fragile" did not enter the Billboard Hot 100, but peaked at number sixteen on the Bubbling Under Hot 100 Singles chart.)	38	—	14	—	—	RIAA: Gold; RMNZ: Gold	Something Else
"Hard" (featuring Murs)	2014	—	—	—	—	—	—		Strangeulation
"Fear"	2014	—	—	—	—	—	—		Strangeulation
"Aw Yeah?"	2015	—	—	—	—	—	—		Special Effects
"Dyin' Flyin'"	2015	—	—	—	—	—	—		Special Effects
"Hood Go Crazy" (featuring 2 Chainz and B.o.B.)	2015	90	27	20	10	—	—	RIAA: Platinum; RMNZ: Gold	Special Effects
"On the Bible" (featuring Zuse and T.I.)	2015	—	—	—	—	—	—		Special Effects
"Speedom (Worldwide Choppers 2)" (featuring Krizz Kaliko and Eminem)	2015	—	— (Note: "Speedom (Worldwide Choppers 2)" did not enter the Hot R&B/Hip-Hop Songs chart, but peaked at number three on the Bubbling Under R&B/Hip-Hop Singles chart.)	—	16	—	—		Special Effects
"We Just Wanna Party" (featuring Rittz and Darrein Saffron)	2015	—	—	—	—	—	—		Strangeulation Vol. II
"PBSA" (featuring Ces Cru)	2015	—	—	—	—	—	—		Strangeulation Vol. II
"Push Start" (featuring Big Scoob)	2015	—	—	—	—	—	—		Strangeulation Vol. II
"Erbody But Me" (featuring Bizzy and Krizz Kaliko)	2016	—	—	—	37	—	—		The Storm
"Sriracha" (featuring Logic and Joyner Lucas)	2016	—	—	—	—	—	—		The Storm
"Don't Nobody Want None"	2018	—	—	—	27	—	—		Planet
"Bad JuJu" (featuring King Iso)	2018	—	—	—	—	—	—		Planet
"No Reason (The Mosh Pit Song)" (featuring Machine Gun Kelly and Y2)	2018	—	—	—	—	—	—		Planet
"My Own Zone" (featuring Futuristic and Dizzy Wright)	2018	—	—	—	—	—	—		N9NA
"Chuki Fever"	2018	—	—	—	—	—	—		N9NA
"H.O.B." (featuring Navé Monjo)	2018	—	—	—	—	—	—		N9NA
"Face Off" (featuring Joey Cool, King Iso, and Dwayne Johnson)	2021	— (Note: "Face Off" did not enter the Billboard Hot 100, but peaked at number four on the Bubbling Under Hot 100 Singles chart.)	45	—	—	—	77		Asin9ne
"Pull Out" (featuring Head da Don)	2023	—	—	—	36	—	—		Bliss
"Drill Sergeant"	2023	—	—	—	—	—	—		Bliss
"Fatha Fig Ya (Food For Thought)" (featuring RMR)	2023	—	—	—	—	—	—		Bliss
"Things I Like"	2023	—	—	—	—	—	—		Bliss
"3D"	2023	—	—	—	—	—	—		Bliss
"Screen"	2023	—	—	—	—	—	—		Bliss
"Roll Call" (featuring JL, Joey Cool, King Iso, Lex Bratcher, Rittz & X-Raided)	2024	—	—	—	—	—	—		COSM
"Drippy Drop" (featuring Skatterman & Snug Brim)	2024	—	—	—	—	—	—		COSM
"No Popcorn" (featuring Fatman Scoop)	2024	—	—	—	—	—	—		COSM
"P.O.W." (featuring Marley Young)	2024	—	—	—	—	—	—		COSM
"Boomer Rang" (featuring K.A.A.N, Stevie Stone & UBI)	2024	—	—	—	—	—	—		COSM
"RDV"	2025	—	—	—	—	—	—		5816 Forest

=== As featured artist ===
List of singles as a featured artist, showing year released, peak chart positions and album name
Title	Year	Peak chart positions	Album
Title	Year	AUS	Album
"The Anthem" (Sway & King Tech featuring Chino XL, Eminem, Jayo Felony, KRS-One, Kool G Rap, Pharoahe Monch, RZA, Tech N9ne and Xzibit)	1999	—	This or That
"I Gotta Know" (FiggKidd featuring Redfoo and Tech N9ne)	2004	50	What Is FiggKidd?
"Rip Your Heart Out" (Hopsin featuring Tech N9ne)	2013	—	Knock Madness
"Rain Dance" (Stevie Stone featuring Tech N9ne and Mystikal)	2015	—	Malta Bend
"Barely Human" (Royce da 5'9 featuring Tech N9ne)	2017	—	Non-album single
"Talk" (Futuristic featuring Tech N9ne and Devvon Terrell)	2017	—	Blessings
"YouTube Rapper" (Token featuring Tech N9ne)	2018	—	Between Somewhere
"Drop It" (Black Oxygen featuring Tech N9ne, Young Miller and Troy)	2018	—	Non-album single
"CMFT Must Be Stopped" (Corey Taylor featuring Tech N9ne and Kid Bookie)	2020	—	CMFT
"Idol" (Hollywood Undead featuring Tech N9ne)	2020	—	New Empire, Vol. 2
"Picture Perfect" (Rittz featuring Tech N9ne)	2020	—	Picture Perfect
"THIS IS WAR" (GAWNE featuring Tech N9ne and Atlus)	2021	—	Non-album single
"Ronald" (Falling in Reverse featuring Tech N9ne and Alex Terrible)	2024	—	Popular Monster
"—" denotes a recording that did not chart or was not released in that territory.

== Other charted songs ==
Title	Year	Peak chart positions			Album
Title	Year	US	US Heatseekers Songs	NZ Hot	Album
"Demons" (featuring Three 6 Mafia)	2009	—	41	—	K.O.D.
"Interlude" (Lil Wayne featuring Tech N9ne and André 3000)	2011	— (Note: "Interlude" did not enter the Billboard Hot 100, but peaked at number twenty four on the Bubbling Under Hot 100 Singles chart.)	—	—	Tha Carter IV
"Trust" (NF featuring Tech N9ne)	2021	— (Note: "Trust" did not enter the Billboard Hot 100, but peaked at number seventeen on the Bubbling Under Hot 100 Singles chart.)	—	24	Clouds (The Mixtape)

== Guest appearances ==
List of non-single guest appearances, with other performing artists, showing year released and album name
Title	Year	Other artist(s)	Album
"Kansas City (Missouri)"	1992	Pure Dope	Will Get You Higher
"Same Thing Make U Laugh (Make U Cry)"	1997	Who Wride	Who Wride
"They Likes That Shit"	1997	Who Wride	Who Wride
"U Owe Me"	1997	Who Wride	Who Wride
"Everyday Life"	1998	57th Street Rogue Dog Villians	It's On Now
"Husslin' Zone (Deadication)"	1998	57th Street Rogue Dog Villians	It's On Now
"It's On Now"	1998	57th Street Rogue Dog Villians	It's On Now
"Let's Get Fucked Up"	1998	57th Street Rogue Dog Villians	It's On Now
"Praise The Lord & Pass The Ammunition"	1998	57th Street Rogue Dog Villians	It's On Now
"Sick 'Em"	1998	57th Street Rogue Dog Villians	It's On Now
"Let's Get Krunked Up"	1998	57th Street Rogue Dog Villians	—N/a
"Attention All Haters"	1998	Micah	Now & Forever
"Armed Criminal Action (A.C.A.)"	1998	Mr. Stinky, Dun Deala, Fat-Tone, The Popper, Tone Capone	Armed Criminal Action
"7 Sinz"	1998	Snug Brim, D.O.V.E. D.A.W.G., OME	Center Piece Of The Puzzle
"Mr. Steep Pockets"	1998	Snug Brim, Rich The Factor	Center Piece Of The Puzzle
"Critical Mouthpieces"	1998	The Veteran Click	Fresh & Rice: Mad Flava Vol. 1
"Mid Intro: Mad Confusion"	1998	Big Bear	50 MC's
"Ready For The Meat Wagon"	1998	Hydro, Ray Dee, Sloppy	50 MC's
"All Day All Night"	1998	57th Street Rogue Dog Villians	0 To 60 Records Presents: Midwest Mobbin
"Bumbell"	1998	Yukmouth	Thugged Out: The Albulation
"Stallion"	1998	Yukmouth, MC Ren	Thugged Out: The Albulation
"Thugged Out"	1998	Yukmouth, Madd Max, Phats Bossi, Poppa L.Q.	Thugged Out: The Albulation
"Give Us What We Need"	1999	57th Street Rogue Dog Villians	It's On Now: Summer Edition
"Ride 2 Dis"	1999	57th Street Rogue Dog Villians	It's On Now: Summer Edition
"Roll Out"	1999	57th Street Rogue Dog Villians	It's On Now: Summer Edition
"Boss Doggin'"	1999	57th Street Rogue Dog Villians	My Dogs For Life
"Dogs 4 Life"	1999	57th Street Rogue Dog Villians	My Dogs For Life
"God 4 Give Us"	1999	57th Street Rogue Dog Villians	My Dogs For Life
"Gold Tooth Gangsta Shit"	1999	57th Street Rogue Dog Villians	My Dogs For Life
"Kountafittas"	1999	57th Street Rogue Dog Villians	My Dogs For Life
"Let's Get Fucked Up (Mega Mix)"	1999	57th Street Rogue Dog Villians	My Dogs For Life
"Let's Get It Started"	1999	Da Hooligans	Tech N9ne Presents: Da Hooligans
"Smokin' On That Indo"	1999	IcyRoc Kravyn, Boss Hoss, Txx Will	—N/a
"What We Flowin' Fo (Remix)"	1999	IcyRoc Kravyn, Mr. CET	—N/a
"Ain't Nobody Fuckin' Wit It"	1999	Solé	Skin Deep
"The Anthem"	1999	Sway & King Tech, Chino XL, Eminem, Jayo Felony, KRS-One, Kool G Rap, Pharoahe Monch, RZA, Xzibit	This or That
"Lyrical Menageatrois"	1999	The Veteran Click, Vell Bakardy	The Day We Worldwide
"Represent Yo Hood"	1999	The Veteran Click, 57th Street Rogue Dog Villians	The Day We Worldwide
"Life Incognito"	2000	Bakarii	Romeo Ryonell Presents: Twinn' City High Rollin'
"Take A Picture"	2000	Don Juan	Romeo Ryonell Presents: Twinn' City High Rollin'
"Play That Shit"	2000	Big Figures	Game Tight
"Testin'"	2000	C4 Entertainment	Blowin' Up The Midwest
"Oochie-Coochie"	2000	Clout Nine	G To The Game
"Jackin' 2K (DJ Fresh Mix)"	2000	DJ Fresh	DJ Fresh Millennium Mix
"Hijacked 4 Your Brain"	2000	D.O.V.E. D.A.W.G., Crow	The Invasion
"Terror"	2000	D.O.V.E. D.A.W.G., Crow	The Invasion
"Hard To Make Yo Mail"	2000	Heavyweights	Hik Town Heavyweights
"Tech N9ne & Lil' Kim (Skit)"	2000	Heavyweights	Hik Town Heavyweights
"Who Got Tha Keys (Navi)"	2000	Low Life Mafia, Spice 1	Riding Deep & Dirty
"Filthy 50's"	2000	Midwest M.A.F.I.A.	Dope Game 2K
"Pioneer"	2000	S.M.F. AD	Hot 104 Presents: Bullethead
"H2s"	2000	T.B.s	From Mexico to KC Vol. 1
"187 On A Hook"	2001	Brotha Lynch Hung, C-Bo	Blocc Movement
"Don't Breathe (Skit)"	2001	Don Juan	It's My Life and My Turn
"Get Low"	2001	Don Juan	It's My Life and My Turn
"Death Time Soon Near"	2001	Mr. Stinky, Mr. Manson	The Reinforcement
"We No Beg Fren"	2001	Mr. Stinky	The Reinforcement
"Smokin' On G's"	2001	Mr. Stinky, Fimp the Pimp, Rome	The Reinforcement
"Biank Zone"	2001	Don Juan	Live from the Ghetto
"All Out War"	2001	Don Juan, Gonzoe, Poppa L.Q., Yukmouth	—N/a
"Under Pressure" (Remix)	2001	Young Droop	Killa Valley: Moment Of Impakt
"Regime Killers 2001"	2001	Yukmouth, Governor Matic, Madd Maxx, Phats Bossi, Poppa L.Q.	Thug Lord: The New Testament
"Regime Life"	2001	Yukmouth, Lil' Keke, Lil' Mo, Madd Maxx, Phats Bossi	—N/a
"King Song 2002 (Still Getting Fucked Up)"	2002	57th Street Rogue Dog Villians	Roguish Ways
"Millinnium Mitch"	2002	57th Street Rogue Dog Villians	Roguish Ways
"Rogue Dog VillNWA"	2002	57th Street Rogue Dog Villians	Roguish Ways
"Thong Thissle"	2002	57th Street Rogue Dog Villians, IcyRoc Kraven, Sundae	Roguish Ways
"We Came To Party II"	2002	57th Street Rogue Dog Villians, Chris Tips, Tonya	Roguish Ways
"Mo' Flows"	2002	BG Bulletwound, Kutt Calhoun	2 G-D Up
"Kansas City Niggas Keep It Real"	2002	Fat-Tone, Filthy Fattz, Young Fierce	Only In Killa City
"Don't Trust"	2002	High Po4mance	Acceleration
"Tech N9ne Representin' (Skit)"	2002	Hobo Tone	Hobolavirus
"Hobolavirus"	2002	Hobo Tone	Hobolavirus
"Now It's On [KVE Remix]	2002	Lejo, Young Droop	Young Droop Presents: Lethal Weaponz
"Steep Pockets 2"	2002	Skatterman & Snug Brim, Kutt Calhoun	Worth A Million
"Throw Your Hands Up"	2002	Skatterman & Snug Brim, Krizz Kaliko	Worth A Million Promo #1
"Pioneer [Alt. Version]"	2002	Smith A.D.	Music Man Entertainment Presents: Bullish Intentions Vol. 1
"Giddy Up, Giddy Up"	2002	Twin Hog	So Let It Be Written, So Let It Be Done
"Stop Watchin' Me"	2002	Txx Will, Malik	—N/a
"Earthquake"	2002	Don Juan	Hood 2 Hood
"Fist Fulla Dollaz"	2003	Big Hamm, E.S.G., Slick-50	Fist Fulla Dollars
"Root Of All Evil"	2003	Big Hamm, Txx Will	Fist Fulla Dollars
"Don't Hate On Me"	2003	Big Zeke, Skitzo	BZP Presents... Da Gumbo vol. 1
"Riddle Tha Middle"	2003	Cassanova, Skitzo, Ten-10	Yard Sale
"Wake Up Show Intro"	2003	Don Juan, Jay-Z	Don Juan Presents: Midwestside For Triple Life
"Wake Up Show Freestyles"	2003	Don Juan	Don Juan Presents: Midwestside For Triple Life
"It Gets Rough"	2003	Grant Rice	The Grant Rice Empire
"So Heavy (Remix)"	2003	Grant Rice, XTA-C	The Grant Rice Empire
"Thug Pit"	2003	Insane Clown Posse, Bone Thugs-N-Harmony, Esham, Kottonmouth Kings	Hallowicked 2003
"Shit Ain't Sweet"	2003	Kon-Tra-Ban, T-Boy	Kon-Tra-Ban
"Midwest Connection"	2003	Mike D. Chill, Jesse James	Midwest Connection Sampler
"Summertime"	2003	T.O.P. Boyz	Necessary Roughness
"Gangsta Party"	2003	The Doe Boyz	Yoda House Livin'
"In My City"	2003	Trajik, BoChamp, Hobo Tone, Krizz Kaliko	1ne Of A Kynd
"Serial Killa"	2003	Twiztid	The Green Book
"KCMO"	2003	Vertigo	Vertigo
"Grin On My Grill"	2003	X Dash, Krizz Kaliko, Kutt Calhoun	There Goes The Neighborhood
"Yesterday"	2003	Young Suspense, Interwine	Thug Hop
"Regime Mobstaz"	2003	Yukmouth, Dorasel, Gonzoe, Grant Rice, Krizz Kaliko, Monsta Ganjah, Poppa L.Q.	Godzilla
"Somebody Gone Die 2 Nite"	2003	Yukmouth, Benjilino, Hussein Fatal, Tha Realest	Godzilla
"Thugs Get Lonely Too"	2004	2Pac	—N/a
"I Gotta Know"	2004	Figgkidd, Redfoo	This Is Figgkidd
"Die"	2004	Killa C	Tainted Flesh
"Downfall"	2004	Killa C, Krizz Kaliko	Tainted Flesh
"Goldberg"	2004	Kutt Calhoun	B.L.E.V.E.
"Real Sex"	2004	Kutt Calhoun	B.L.E.V.E.
"Keep It Keeblur"	2004	Kutt Calhoun, Krizz Kaliko	B.L.E.V.E.
"N A White Manz Eyez"	2004	Kutt Calhoun, Krizz Kaliko	B.L.E.V.E.
"Broken Chains"	2004	Lyrycyst	Broken Chains
"Mr. Get Over (Remix)"	2004	Mr. Stinky, D. Clyce	Holdin' Court In The Streets
"Say What Ya Wanna"	2004	Potluck	Harvest Time
"Access Denied"	2004	Project: Deadman, King Gordy	Self Inflicted
"Lapdance"	2004	Skatterman & Snug Brim, Krizz Kaliko	Urban Legendz
"Mafioso"	2004	Skatterman & Snug Brim, Greed, Kutt Calhoun	Urban Legendz
"Pakman"	2004	Skatterman & Snug Brim, Kutt Calhoun	Urban Legendz
"So What Chu' Tellin' Me"	2004	Tha Rellez	Tha R.E.B.I.R.T.H.
"Super Villians"	2004	57th Street Rogue Dog Villians	Murder Dog Presents: Kansas City
"Kill 'Em Off"	2004	Yukmouth, Gonzoe, Krizz Kaliko	United Ghettos of America Vol. 2
"Bang"	2005	D-Loc and Dalima, Krizz Kaliko	Gillhead Structure
"Ways Of The World"	2005	Empire	Crowned
"Slow Motion"	2005	E-Skool, Louie Da Saint, The Popper	U Thought I Was Playin'?
"Saw"	2005	False Prophet Coalition	Pray For Us: Book II
"Die Again"	2005	Grave Plott	Puttin' U In
"Madhouse"	2005	Insane Clown Posse	Forgotten Freshness Volume 4
"Thug Pit (Remix)"	2005	Insane Clown Posse, Bone Thugs-N-Harmony, Esham, Kottonmouth Kings	Forgotten Freshness Volume 4
"Sick Sick Em"	2005	J-Flo	Sick Sick Em
"Voicez"	2005	Judge D	No Compromize
"F.T.I. 2 (Let 'Em Know Remix)"	2005	Kottonmouth Kings	Joint Venture
"F.T.I. 2"	2005	Kottonmouth Kings	No. 7
"Like It Or Not"	2005	Okwerdz	Random Acts Of Music
"No Mercy"	2005	ROC, Mario D	The Awakening
"I Do (Remix)"	2005	The Popper, Boy Big, Fat-Tone, Jeshawn The Fireman, Krizz Kaliko	Tha "I Do" Remix Disc
"Snuff You"	2005	Tragedy, Prozak	Razorbladez & Hand Grenedez
"Need Some Help"	2005	Twiztid, Krizz Kaliko, Project: Deadman	Fright Fest 2005
"International Playa"	2005	U$O	JegVilGerneDuVilGerneViSkalGerne
"Intro"	2006	Agginy	Ex-Girlfriend Mixtape
"Rhyme"	2006	Bigg Ben, Kutt Calhoun	—N/a
"Dark Places"	2006	Ceza	Yerli Plaka
"I Go Again"	2006	Fifth Lane	Our Lane Or No Lane!
"High Sidin'"	2006	Grant Rice	—N/a
"AZ-2-KC"	2006	JJ SoSik, Darkside Immortals	Demonic 2006-6-6
"Intro"	2006	Killa C	Old Skewl Killa
"The Witch (Remix)"	2006	Insane Clown Posse	The Wraith: Remix Album
"Phone Calls (Skit)"	2006	Potluck, Cool Nutz, Daddy X, Josh's Mom, Yukmouth	Straight Outta Humboldt
"What We Are"	2006	Potluck, Krizz Kaliko	Straight Outta Humboldt
"Shout Out (Interlude)"	2006	Mac Moore	Tha Rap Deception
"Kansas City"	2006	Ragtop	Tha Rise, Tha Fall, Tha Take Over
"Style"	2006	R.O.B., Dutch	Reflection Of Brilliance
"Say What Ya Wanna (Remix)"	2006	Potluck	Humboldt Storms vol. 1: Torrential
"It's On Now (Chiefs Remix)"	2007	57th Street Rogue Dog Villians, Rich The Factor, The Incredible Zig	New World Hustle
"Thug Company"	2007	57th Street Rogue Dog Villians	New World Hustle
"Wind Me Up"	2007	Hed PE, Kottonmouth Kings	Insomnia
"We Does That"	2007	Arapahoe T.R.U.E.S., Yukmouth	Eternal Flow
"Million Miles"	2007	Big B	More to Hate
"Knock 'Em Out"	2007	Bizarre, King Gordy	Blue Cheese & Coney Island
"Drinking Game (Skit)"	2007	Critical Bill	Downtown The World
"Premium"	2007	Critical Bill	Downtown The World
"WTF (Skit)"	2007	Critical Bill	Downtown The World
"City 2 City"	2007	Kottonmouth Kings, Krizz Kaliko	Cloud Nine
"Hit Me Back"	2007	Kutt Calhoun	Flamez Mixtape
"Move On"	2007	Kutt Calhoun	Flamez Mixtape
"Fight"	2007	R.I.A.	Destruction
"Bury 'Em All"	2007	Twiztid, Krizz Kaliko, Potluck	Independent's Day
"La La Land"	2007	Gina Cassavetes	Alpha Dog (Soundtrack)
"Lyrical Orgasms"	2007	Lo Key, T.O.N.E-Z	Best of T.O.N.E-Z Vol. 1
"Action"	2007	Kottonmouth Kings	Strange Noize Tour
"Problem Addict"	2007	Kottonmouth Kings	Strange Noize Tour
"Respect"	2007	X-Clan	Return from Mecca
"Bread & Butter"	2008	BG Bulletwound, Krizz Kaliko, Skatterman	G14 Classified
"What'z Ya Name"	2008	BG Bulletwound, Grant Rice	G14 Classified
"Killin' It"	2008	DieNasty Records, Kalibur, Kostik	The Live Sick Compilation
"Let's Ride"	2008	DJ Clay	Let 'Em Bleed: The Mixxtape, Vol. 3
"Intro (Skit)"	2008	Grave Plott	The Plott Thickens
"Snap"	2008	Grave Plott	The Plott Thickens
"Only Time Will Tell"	2008	Ill Bill, Everlast, Necro	The Hour of Reprisal
"Look at Me"	2008	J. Win, Krizz Kaliko, Kutt Calhoun	J. Win Presents Park Boyz
"Sex Toy"	2008	Kottonmouth Kings	The Green Album
"Wild"	2008	Kredulous, 3rd Degree, Krizz Kaliko	Tears of An Angel
"Wild (Slantize Remix)"	2008	Kredulous, 3rd Degree, Krizz Kaliko	Tears of An Angel
"Ain't'cha Bitch"	2008	Krizz Kaliko	Vitiligo
"Anxiety"	2008	Krizz Kaliko	Vitiligo
"Jungle Love"	2008	Krizz Kaliko	Vitiligo
"What's Sizzlin'"	2008	Krizz Kaliko	Vitiligo
"Rewind"	2008	Krizz Kaliko	Vitiligo
"Crew Cut"	2008	Krizz Kaliko, BG Bulletwound, Kutt Calhoun, Makzilla, Skatterman & Snug Brim	Vitiligo
"Slow Down"	2008	Krizz Kaliko, Agginy	Vitiligo
"Where You Want Me"	2008	Krizz Kaliko, Kutt Calhoun	Vitiligo
"I See It"	2008	Kutt Calhoun	Feature Presentation
"School Dayz"	2008	Kutt Calhoun, Krizz Kaliko	Feature Presentation
"Stop Jeffin"	2008	Kutt Calhoun, BG Bulletwound, Krizz Kaliko	Feature Presentation
"Salute"	2008	Messy Marv, Big Scoob, Krizz Kaliko	Draped Up & Chipped Out 3
"Cuckoo's Nest"	2008	Monday	7E
"Sideshow"	2008	Monday, Dame Dub	7E
"Keep It Hott"	2008	Mr. Garth-Culti-Vader	Unpredictable Individual
"Bodies Fall"	2008	Prozak, Blaze Ya Dead Homie, Kutt Calhoun, The R.O.C.	Tales From The Sick
"Run Away"	2008	Prozak, Krizz Kaliko	Tales From The Sick
"Why???"	2008	Prozak, Twista	Tales From The Sick
"Kansas City (Remix)"	2008	Rag Lucci, Boy Big, Joe Vertigo, Krizz Kaliko	Fokuz on Me
"I'm That Nigga"	2008	Skatterman & Snug Brim, Rich The Factor, The Popper	Word on tha Streets
"Get Back"	2008	Skatterman & Snug Brim, Krizz Kaliko, Travis O'Guin	Word on tha Streets
"Go Hard"	2008	Skatterman & Snug Brim, BG Bulletwound	Word on tha Streets
"Heartbreaker"	2008	Skatterman & Snug Brim, Krizz Kaliko	Word on tha Streets
"Kiss This"	2008	The Popper, Krizz Kaliko	Here Comes Popper (Tha Mixtape)
"My Problems"	2008	T-Trash	Kill Me Now
"Problematic"	2008	T-Trash, Billy Boy	Kill Me Now
"No More Me And You"	2008	Krizz Kaliko	Strictly Strange '08
"Whip It"	2008	Kutt Calhoun	Strictly Strange '08
"Mobsta Mobsta"	2008	Yukmouth, Ampichino, Dorasel, Freeze, Monsta Ganjah, Tha Realest	Million Dollar Mouthpiece
"Don't Get Stomped"	2009	Big Scoob	Monsterifik
"Salue"	2009	Big Scoob	Monsterifik
"Freaks Of The Industry"	2009	Big Scoob, Krizz Kaliko, Kutt Calhoun	Monsterifik
"Monsterifik"	2009	Big Scoob, Krizz Kaliko	Monsterifik
"Stik @ Move"	2009	Big Scoob, Bakarii, Krizz Kaliko, Txx Will	Monsterifik
"Talkin' Shit"	2009	Dalima	Tha Hangover
"Where's My Head At"	2009	Grewsum	—N/a
"Work On This"	2009	Hed PE	New World Orphans
"6 Ways from Sunday"	2009	Killa C, Haystak, Spice-1, Bizarre, Skatterman	Bound In Chains
"Garden Snakes"	2009	Killa C	Bound In Chains
"Be Right Back"	2009	Krizz Kaliko, Big Scoob	Genius
"Get Off"	2009	Krizz Kaliko	Genius
"Happy Birthday"	2009	Krizz Kaliko	Genius
"Hum Drum"	2009	Krizz Kaliko	Genius
"So High"	2009	Krizz Kaliko, Kutt Calhoun	Genius
"Bare en Pige/Just a Girl"	2009	L.O.C.	Melankolia / XxxCouture
"Serious"	2009	Liquid Assassin, Black Pegasus	Apocalypse
"Gain Green"	2009	Messy Marv, Big Scoob, Krizz Kaliko	Draped Up And Chipped Out vol. 4
"Rock 'n Rollin'"	2009	Mims	Guilt
"Sumn' Like A Pimp"	2009	Paul Wall, Krizz Kaliko	Fast Life
"Road Warrior"	2009	Short Dawg Tha Native, Kutt Calhoun	The Black Sheep
"Whatcha Wanna Do"	2009	Short Dawg Tha Native	The Black Sheep
"Midwest Explosion"	2009	Stevie Stone	New Kid Comin
"Bollywood Chick"	2009	Swollen Members, Tre Nyce	Armed to the Teeth
"Show Em What Crazy Is"	2009	The Undergods (Canibus and Keith Murray)	Canibus and Keith Murray are the Undergods
"Problems"	2009	Twista	Category F5
"Sum Dem Murder"	2009	Yukmouth, Ampichino, Gonzoe, Kenny Kingpin, Tha Realest	The West Coast Don
"Affiliated"	2010	A.F.F.I.L.I.A.T.E.S., San Quinn	Tha Next Dynasty
"From AK to KC Mo"	2010	Alaska Redd, Krizz Kaliko, Kutt Calhoun	Trapped In The Land of The Frozen
"Believer"	2010	Bizarre	Friday Night at St. Andrews
"Don't Worry Momma It's Just Bleeding"	2010	Brotha Lynch Hung, Krizz Kaliko, C-Lim, BZO, Gmacc	Dinner and a Movie
"Born 2 Be Fly"	2010	Cognito, Krizz Kaliko	Automatic
"Hip-Hop"	2010	Cognito, B-Legit	Automatic
"Strangers"	2010	Cognito, Big Scoob, Kutt Calhoun, Loki, Stevie Stone	Automatic
"Violated"	2010	Cognito, Krizz Kaliko	Automatic
"Think They Know Me"	2010	Jordan~Jay, Layzie Bone	The Feature Presentation
"Party Monster"	2010	Kottonmouth Kings	Long Live the Kings
"All Gas No Brakes"	2010	Krizz Kaliko, 816 Boyz, Kutt Calhoun, Makzilla	Shock Treatment
"Elevator"	2010	Krizz Kaliko	Shock Treatment
"Freaks"	2010	Krizz Kaliko	Shock Treatment
"Get Around"	2010	Krizz Kaliko	Shock Treatment
"Simon Says"	2010	Krizz Kaliko	Shock Treatment
"Tonight"	2010	Krizz Kaliko, Kutt Calhoun	Shock Treatment
"Naked (Boom Boom Room)"	2010	Kutt Calhoun, Krizz Kaliko	Raw and Un-Kutt
"Somethin's Gotta Give"	2010	Kutt Calhoun	Raw and Un-Kutt
"I'm Gucci (Remix)"	2010	Lil Hype, 816 Boyz, Krizz Kaliko, Kutt Calhoun, Makzilla	Stuck on Broke
"Jump Around The Room"	2010	Matic Lee, Young Lucci	D.O.A. EP
"Killer of Men (Club Mix)"	2010	OME	Reserved
"Quick Flick"	2010	Spinstyles, Krizz Kaliko	Quick Flick
"Broken Chains (Remix)"	2010	Steven Cooper	My Time
"2010 Wake Up Show Anthem"	2010	Sway & King Tech, B-Real, Crooked I, DJ Jazzy Jeff, DJ Qbert, DJ Revolution, Kam Moye, Locksmith, Ras Kass, RZA, Tajai	—N/a
"Shots After Shots"	2010	Three 6 Mafia	Laws of Power
"Drunk & Stupid"	2011	Big Scoob	Damn Fool
"Spotlight"	2011	Big Scoob	Damn Fool
"I Move with the Night"	2011	Big Scoob, T-Nutty	Damn Fool
"ICU"	2011	Brotha Lynch Hung	Coathanga Strangla
"Takin Online Orders"	2011	Brotha Lynch Hung	Coathanga Strangla
"Better Believe It"	2011	Da Kennel	Rolling Stonez
"Fried"	2011	E-40, Marty James	Revenue Retrievin': Graveyard Shift
"Clappin'"	2011	George Zelaya	My Business
"Clappin' (Remix)"	2011	George Zelaya, Matic Lee	My Business
"Kill or Be Killed"	2011	Jay Rock, Krizz Kaliko	Follow Me Home
"Night Train (Remix)"	2011	Joell Ortiz, Bun B, Novel	—N/a
"Down"	2011	Krizz Kaliko	S.I.C.
"Medicine"	2011	Krizz Kaliko	S.I.C.
"Interlude"	2011	Lil Wayne, Andre 3000	Tha Carter IV
"Fuck Food (Remix)"	2011	¡Mayday!, Lil' Wayne, T-Pain	—N/a
"Strange 'N' Dangerous"	2011	Mr. Liqz	SikCyde
"When I Was High (Remix)"	2011	Nikkiya, Rittz	—N/a
"New Years"	2011	Outlawz	Perfect Timing
"For the MO"	2011	The Popper, Ron Ron, Donta Slusha	For the MO
"All That I Know"	2011	Trae Tha Truth, Mystikal, Brian Angel	—N/a
"Raw Shit"	2011	Travis Barker, Bun B	Give the Drummer Some
"Midwest Meltdown"	2011	T.T, Twista	—N/a
"Don't Stop"	2011	Txx Will	Maximum Volume
"How Ya Do Dat Again"	2011	Young Bleed, Brotha Lynch Hung	Preserved
"Go Nutz"	2011	Yukmouth, The Grouch	The Tonight Show: Thuggin & Mobbin
"Hell Song"	2012	Chino XL	Ricanstruction: The Black Rosary
"Scorpio"	2012	E-40, London	The Block Brochure: Welcome to the Soil 2
"Zombie"	2012	E-40, Brotha Lynch Hung	The Block Brochure: Welcome to the Soil 2
"Go Study"	2012	Illmaculate, Krizz Kaliko, Only One	Skrill Talk
"SKREEEM"	2012	Insane Clown Posse, Hopsin	The Mighty Death Pop!
"Say You Love Me"	2012	JL	Brain Scatter
"Kill Shit"	2012	Krizz Kaliko, Twista	Kickin' and Screamin'
"Abu Dhabi"	2012	Krizz Kaliko, 816 Boyz	Kickin' and Screamin'
"Spaz"	2012	Krizz Kaliko	Kickin' and Screamin'
"Can't Be The Only One"	2012	Krizz Kaliko	Kickin' and Screamin'
"Hello Walls"	2012	Krizz Kaliko	Kickin' and Screamin'
"Strange"	2012	Krizz Kaliko	Neh'mind
"Badlands"	2012	¡Mayday!	Take Me To Your Leader
"Edge of Destruction"	2012	MGK, Twista	Lace Up
"Game Over"	2012	McFee	Loose Cannon Playaz
"Enemy"	2012	Prozak	Paranormal
"One of These Days"	2012	Prozak, Krizz Kaliko	Paranormal
"Bloody Murdah (Remix)"	2012	Rittz	—N/a
"808 Bendin'"	2012	Stevie Stone	Rollin' Stone
"Blapper"	2012	T-Pain, Mistah F.A.B., Krizz Kaliko	Stoic
"Rock The Bells Anthem"	2012	Chali 2na, Everlast, KRS-One, Murs, Sick Jacken, Supernatural	The Official Rock The Bells Mixtape 2012
"Free"	2013	Aqualeo, Krizz Kaliko	Speaking of The Devil
"Stabbed"	2013	Brotha Lynch Hung, Hopsin	Mannibalector
"Juice"	2013	Ces Cru	Constant Energy Struggles
"Bender (KC All-Star Remix)"	2013	Center of Attention (KJ and thePhantom*), Dutch Newman, Godemis, Irv Da Phenom, JL, Joey Cool, Mac Lethal, Yung Prez, Yung Stylez	—N/a
"Let Me Get It"	2013	Crooked I	Apex Predator
"Sit There, Don't Sleep"	2013	Crooked I	—N/a
"Mama Said Knock You Out" (LL Cool J cover)	2013	Five Finger Death Punch	The Wrong Side of Heaven and the Righteous Side of Hell, Volume 1
"Rising"	2013	Harry Fraud	High Tide
"Rip Your Heart Out"	2013	Hopsin	Knock Madness
"Titties"	2013	Krizz Kaliko	Son of Sam
"Scars"	2013	Krizz Kaliko	Son of Sam
"I Been Dope"	2013	Kutt Calhoun	Black Gold
"Go Nutz (Remix)"	2013	Lee Majors, Yukmouth	Yukmouth Presents The Regime: The Last Dragon
"Go Nutz (Remix 2)"	2013	Lee Majors, Yukmouth	Yukmouth Presents The Regime: Dragon Gang
"Last One Standing"	2013	¡Mayday!	Believers
"Game Over (Remix)"	2013	McFee, MadChild	Therapy
"Point of No Return"	2013	Metta World Peace	The Passion
"I'm Trippin'"	2013	Mr. Pookie	Blue Flame
"Dreaming"	2013	N.O.R.E., ¡Mayday!	Student of the Game
"Holla-Loo-Yuh"	2013	R.A. the Rugged Man, Krizz Kaliko	Legends Never Die
"The Arrival"	2013	Relentless One	The Arrival
"Say No More"	2013	Rittz, Krizz Kaliko	The Life and Times of Jonny Valiant
"ILLA (Regime Mix)"	2013	Slam 1, Freeze	Yukmouth Presents The Regime: The Last Dragon
"You're Welcome"	2013	Snow Tha Product	Good Nights & Bad Mornings 2: The Hanover
"The Baptism"	2013	Stevie Stone, Rittz	2 Birds 1 Stone
"Now Ya Know"	2013	T-Cool	—N/a
"Salute Me"	2013	Tali Blanco	—N/a
"Freak"	2013	Wrekonize	The War Within
"Sound of Unity"	2014	Yas	—N/a
"Pop It for a Player (Remix)"	2014	Psych Ward Druggies, The Game, E-40	—N/a
"Death Warrant"	2014	Sadistik, Sticky Fingaz	Ultraviolet
"Power Play"	2014	Ces Cru	Codename: Ego Stripper
"Crisis"	2014	Twista	The Dark Horse
"Bobby Be Real"	2014	Slaine, Battleaxe Warriors, MadChild	—N/a
"God Bless America"	2015	Dizzy Wright, Big K.R.I.T., Chel'le	The Growing Process
"Rated X"	2015	Stevie Stone	Malta Bend
"Beast (Southpaw Remix)"	2015	Rob Bailey and The Hustle Standard, Busta Rhymes, KXNG Crooked	Southpaw (Music from and Inspired by the Motion Picture)
"Know It"	2015	¡Mayday!, Stige	Future Vintage
"Ghost"	2015	Prof	Liability
"Purgatory"	2015	Prozak, Krizz Kaliko	Black Ink
"Do You Know Where You Are"	2015	Prozak, Twiztid	Black Ink
"Fight"	2015	The ODS, R.I.A.	—N/a
"Wake Em Up"	2015	E-A-Ski, Too Short	—N/a
"Ohh Noo"	2015	Chris Webby, Jarren Benton	—N/a
"Bring a Bomb"	2015	Campo	—N/a
"Great"	2015	Necessary	—N/a
"Now Ya Know"	2015	TCool	—N/a
"Arrival"	2015	Relentless One	—N/a
"John Doe"	2015	C-Bo, T-Nutty	—N/a
"Wallflower"	2016	Krizz Kaliko	Go
"Behave"	2016	Krizz Kaliko	Go
"No Love"	2016	Krizz Kaliko	Go
"Orangutan"	2016	Krizz Kaliko, Rittz, Ces Cru, Wrekonize, JL, B. Hood	Go
"Angel of Death"	2016	Mac Lethal	Congratulations
"Quiet Place"	2016	Bernz, Stige	See You on The Other Side
"The Formula"	2016	Rittz, Krizz Kaliko	Top of the Line
"Fuccboi"	2016	Bass Head Music, Madchild	—N/a
"All for You"	2016	Darrein Safron	The Brilliant EP
"U Don't Want It"	2016	Trick Trick, Diezel	—N/a
"Verbal Warfare"	2016	Lethal Injektion, Twista	—N/a
"You Feelin' Me"	2016	Fat Tone, Krizz Kaliko, Bishop Young Don	—N/a
"Intoxicated"	2016	Big Scoob, Txx Will, Bakarii	H.O.G.
"Shoot Back (Dear Officer)"	2016	Crooked I	Good vs. Evil
"Radiation"	2017	Adina Howard	Resurrection
"Saturday"	2017	JL, Marley Young, The Popper	DIBKIS
"Two Up"	2017	JL, Suli4Q	DIBKIS
"Technology"	2017	JL	DIBKIS
"Long Night"	2017	¡Mayday!	The Search Party
"Fight"	2017	Real Industry Assassins	—N/a
"Monster"	2017	Bukshot, Krizz Kaliko	—N/a
"The Other Side"	2017	Teri Legato, Krizz Kaliko, Jess Hurley	—N/a
"Movin It"	2017	Beatnick, K Salaam	—N/a
"Creatures of the Night"	2017	Mars, Twiztid	—N/a
"Pump"	2017	Merkules, Stevie Ross	—N/a
"All Yours"	2017	Stevie Stone, Adrian Truth	Level Up
"Eat" (Part 2)	2017	Stevie Stone, JL, Joey Cool	Level Up
"Rock Out"	2017	CES Cru	Catastrophic Event Specialists
"Jealousy"	2017	DJ Kay Slay, Busta Rhymes, The Game, Meet Sims	The Big Brother
"On Me"	2018	Big Scoob	Duality
"For My Dogs"	2018	Big Scoob, Bizz Gotti, Txx Will, Mr Whitebear. Boogieman	Duality
"Not One of Them"	2018	Stevie Stone, JL	Kontra-Band
"Same Way"	2018	Murs	A Strange Journey Into the Unimaginable
"Assassin's Creed"	2018	Token, Passionate MC	Forever M.C.
"Terminally ill"	2018	Rittz, KXNG Crooked, Chino XL, Statik Selektah	Forever M.C.
"Hard"	2018	Joey Cool, JL, Stylez	Joey Cool
"Run Up"	2018	¡Mayday!	South of 5th
"Thanos"	2018	The Underground Avengers, Rittz, Krizz Kaliko, JellyRoll, Twiztid Crucifix & King ISO	Anomaly 88
"Madness (Remix)"	2019	Ubiquitous, Krizz Kaliko, ¡Mayday!, Info Gates	Under Bad Influence
"Bass"	2019	Merkules, Hopsin	Special Occasion
"Bet It All"	2019	Joey Cool, Zoo, JL	Old Habits Die Hard
"Ay"	2019	Maez301	Maez301
"Creature"	2020	Jelly Roll, Krizz Kaliko	A Beautiful Disaster
"Requiem"	2020	King Iso	World War Me
"Teknique"	2020	Stevie Stone, Dawn P	Black Lion
"Daylight"	2020	Jehry Robinson	20/Twenty
"21"	2020	Krizz Kaliko	Legend
"Follow The Drip"	2020	Krizz Kaliko	Legend
"Understood"	2020	Krizz Kaliko, Jehry Robinson	Legend
"Means to an End"	2020	JL	The Devil Hates Sundays
"Idol"	2020	Hollywood Undead	New Empire, Vol. 2
"Lions"	2020	Joey Cool, JL, Jehry Robinson	Coolie High
"Loud"	2021	Samantha Fish	Faster
"Nekked Club"	2022	Morris Day	Last Call
"Raw!"	2024	Conway the Machine	Slant Face Killah
"Still Hating"	2026	D12, King Iso, Sly Pyper	D12 Forever Vol. 1
"Shield"	2026	Reza Pishro, Yas	—N/a

== Music videos ==
Year	Title	Director	Artist(s)
As main performer
2002	"Slacker"	Ben Mor	—N/a
2003	"Here Comes Tecca Nina"^{[A1]}	Ben Meade	—N/a
2003	"Imma Tell"	Christopher Horvath	—N/a
2004	"I'll Pass"^{[A2]}	Fearless Eye	—N/a
2006	"Bout Ta' Bubble"	Prozak	—N/a
2007	"That Owl"^{[A6]}	Josiah M. Jones	—N/a
2008	"Like Yeah"	Estevan Oriol	—N/a
2009	"Red Nose"	Dan Gedman	—N/a
2009	"Show Me a God"	Dan Gedman	—N/a
2009	"Leave Me Alone"	Dan Gedman	—N/a
2009	"Low"	Dan Gedman	—N/a
2010	"O.G."	Dan Gedman	—N/a
2010	"KC Tea"	Dan Gedman	—N/a
2010	"Ego Trippin'"	Dan The Man	—N/a
2011	"Mama Nem"	Dan Gedman	—N/a
2011	"He's a Mental Giant"	Dan Gedman	—N/a
2011	"Who Do I Catch"	Dan Gedman	
2012	"Am I a Psycho?"	Dan Gedman	featuring B.o.B and Hopsin
2012	"E.B.A.H"	Anthony Devera	—N/a
2012	"Don't Tweet This"	Anthony Devera	—N/a
2012	"URALYA"	Anthony Devera	—N/a
2012	"Alone"	Anthony Devera	—N/a
2013	"So Dope (They Wanna)"	Anthony Devera	featuring Snow tha Product, Twisted Insane and Wrekonize
2013	"Straight Out the Gate"	Casey Patrick Tebo	featuring Krizz Kaliko and Serj Tankian
2013	"B.I.T.C.H."	Dan Gedman	featuring T-Pain
2013	"Party the Pain Away"	Anthony Devera	featuring Liz Suwandi
2013	"Love 2 Dislike Me"	Anthony Devera	featuring Tyler Lyon and Liz Suwandi
2013	"Dwamn"	Anthony Devera	—N/a
2014	"Fragile"	Anthony Devera	featuring Kendal Morgan, Kendrick Lamar and ¡Mayday!
2014	"Strangeulation Cypher"	Anthony Devera	featuring Godemis, Stevie Stone, Murs, Wrekonize, Bernz, Kutt Calhoun, Ubiquitous, Prozak and Krizz Kaliko
2014	"Hard (A Monster Made It)"	Anthony Devera	featuring Murs
2014	"Over It"	Anthony Devera	featuring Ryan Bradley
2014	"Fear"	Anthony Devera	featuring Mackenzie O'Guin
2015	"Aw Yeah (interVENTion)"	Jason Cantu	—N/a
2015	"Hood Go Crazy"	Mike Marasco	featuring 2 Chainz and B.o.B
2015	"On the Bible"	Jason Cantu	featuring T.I. and Zuse
2015	"No K"		featuring E-40 and Krizz Kaliko
2015	"Roadkill"		with Excision
2015	"We Just Wanna Party"		featuring Rittz and Darrein Safron
2015	"PBSA"		featuring Ces Cru
2015	"Strangeulation Vol. II Cypher I"		—N/a
2015	"Strangeulation Vol. II Cypher II"		featuring Stevie Stone and Ces Cru
2015	"Burn It Down"		featuring Ryan Bradley
2015	"Strangeulation Vol. II Cypher IV"		featuring Krizz Kaliko, Rittz and Prozak
2015	"Blunt and a Ho"		featuring Murs and Ubiquitous
2016	"Strangeulation Vol. II Cypher III"		featuring Big Scoob and JL B. Hood
2016	"Strangeulation Vol. II Cypher V"		featuring Murs, Bernz and Wrekonize
2016	"Push Start"		featuring Big Scoob
2016	"Erbody but Me"		featuring Bizzy and Krizz Kaliko
2016	"What If It Was Me"		featuring Krizz Kaliko
As featured performer
1999	"My Dogs 4 Life"^{[A3]}		57th Street Rogue Dog Villians featuring Tech N9ne
2000	"The Anthem"	Jeff Richter; Sway & King Tech	Sway & King Tech featuring Chino XL, Eminem, Jayo Felony, Kool G Rap, KRS-One, Pharoahe Monch, RZA, Tech N9ne and Xzibit
2004	"I Gotta Know"^{[A4]}^{[A5]}	Spencer Susser	FiggKidd featuring Red Foo and Tech N9ne
2005	"Sick Sick 'Em"^{[A5]}		J-Flo featuring Tech N9ne
2007	"City 2 City"		Kottonmouth Kings featuring Krizz Kaliko and Tech N9ne
2009	"Salue"		Big Scoob featuring Tech N9ne
2009	"Bollywood Chick"	DJ Skee	Swollen Members featuring Tre Nyce and Tech N9ne
2010	"Midwest Explosion"	Deji LaRay	Stevie Stone featuring Tech N9ne
2010	"Believer"	Anthony Ernest Garth	Bizarre featuring Nate Walka and Tech N9ne
2010	"Naked (Boom Boom Room)"	Dan Gedman	Kutt Calhoun featuring Tech N9ne
2010	"2010 Wake Up Show Anthem"		Sway & King Tech featuring B-Real, Crooked I, DJ Jazzy Jeff, DJ Qbert, DJ Revolution, Kam Moye, Locksmith, Ras Kass, RZA, Tajai and Tech N9ne
2010	"Elevator"	Dan Gedman	Krizz Kaliko featuring Tech N9ne
2011	"For The MO"	Chuck Browne	The Popper featuring Donta Slusha, Ron Ron and Tech N9ne
2011	"All That I Know"	Philly Fly Boy	Trae featuring Brian Angel, Mystikal and Tech N9ne
2012	"Midwest Meltdown"	Morocco Vaughn	T.T. featuring Tech N9ne and Twista
2012	"Badlands"	Dan Gedman	¡Mayday! featuring Tech N9ne
2012	"Abu Dhabi"		Krizz Kaliko with 816 Boyz
2012	"Enemy"	Prozak	Prozak featuring Tech N9ne
2012	"Zombie"	E-40	E-40 featuring Brotha Lynch Hung and Tech N9ne
2012	"808 Bendin'"	Deji LaRay	Stevie Stone featuring Tech N9ne
2012	"Bloody Murdah (Remix)"	Anthony Devera	Rittz featuring Tech N9ne
2013	"Juice"	Anthony Devera	Ces Cru featuring Tech N9ne
2013	"I Been Dope"	Dan Gedman	Kutt Calhoun featuring Tech N9ne
2013	"Go Nutz"	Jae Synth	The Regime
2013	"Dreaming"	Garcia	N.O.R.E. featuring ¡Mayday! and Tech N9ne
2013	"Freak"	Anthony Devera	Wrekonize featuring Tech N9ne
2013	"Holla-Loo-Yuh"	R.A. the Rugged Man and Mike Quill	R.A. the Rugged Man featuring Krizz Kaliko and Tech N9ne
2013	"Salute Me"		Tali Blanco featuring Tech N9ne
2013	"Last One Standing"	Bernz	¡Mayday! featuring Tech N9ne
2013	"Sound Of Unity"	Anthony Devera	Yas featuring Tech N9ne
2014	"Pop It for a Player" (Remix)	Dr. Csalohcin	Psych Ward Druggies featuring E-40, Tech N9ne and The Game
2014	"Crisis"	Anthony Devera	Twista featuring Tech N9ne
2014	"Power Play"	Anthony Devera	Ces Cru featuring Tech N9ne
2015	"Great"	HDTAYFILMS	Necessary featuring Tech N9ne
2015	"Heemin'"		Mac Duna featuring Fa$e, Mac Dre and Tech N9ne
2015	"Ohh Noo"	Zach Zubko	Chris Webby featuring Jarren Benton and Tech N9ne
2015	"Rain Dance"		Stevie Stone featuring Mystikal and Tech N9ne
2015	"Ghost"	Kyle Harbaugh	Prof featuring Tech N9ne
2015	"Purgatory"		Prozak featuring Tech N9ne and Krizz Kaliko
2018	"Youtube Rapper"	Ben Proulx & Token	Token featuring Tech N9ne
2020	"Picture Perfect"	Chris Stempel	Rittz featuring Tech N9ne
2024	"Ronald"	Jensen Noen	Falling in Reverse featuring Tech N9ne
Cameo appearances
1999	"Still Ballin'"	Craig Henry	Yukmouth
2004	"Rap Game"	Gobi M. Rahimi	MC Breed
2005	"Rockstar"	Anthony Ernest Garth	Bizarre
2007	"White Trash Life"	Bryan Heiden	Big B
2008	"Killer Collage"	Necro	Mr. Hyde
2009	"Bunk Rock Bitch"	Dan Gedman	Kutt Calhoun
2009	"Black President to Represent Me"	V	The Popper
2009	"Misunderstood"	Dan Gedman	Krizz Kaliko
2009	"That's Tha Homie"	Snoop Dogg; Ted Chung	Snoop Dogg
2010	"Juggalo Island"	Paul Andresen	Insane Clown Posse
2010	"Last Call"		Txx Will
2010	"Red and Yellow"		Irv Da Phenom featuring B Double E and Cash Image
2011	"Man In My City (Remix)"	Kamera Man	Nesto the Owner featuring Bishop Young Don, Cash Image, Rondoe, The Popper, V.V. and Xta-C
2011	"All I Kno Is Hood"	Dan Gedman	Big Scoob featuring Krizz Kaliko
2011	"Too Gangsta"		Txx Will
2011	"Changes"	Justin Marmorstein	Ces Cru
2011	"Hotboxin the Van"	Bert Trevino	Baby Bash, Marcus Manchild and Paul Wall
2012	"Until Then"	Prozak	Prozak
2012	"Damage"	Krizz Kaliko and Anthony Devera	Krizz Kaliko featuring Snow Tha Product
2013	"The Reason"	Anthony Devera	Stevie Stone featuring Spaide Ridder
2015	"Choices (Yup)"	Ben Griffin	E-40
2017	"Chop Suey"	Brotha Lynch Hung, Iso, and Twisted Insane	Twisted Insane featuring Brotha Lynch Hung and Iso

Music videos notes
1. This video can only be found on the Das Bus DVD.
2. This video was released on the T9X DVD in 2004, it was recorded several years prior, evident by Don Juan being present.
3. Remains unreleased in full, was released in clips of each verse through the 57th Street Rogue Dog Villians old official site.
4. There were two versions of this video made, the first was released normally, the second was made available through FiggKidd's forum, completely different from the first, this one having a more adult theme.
5. ^{a} ^{b} Footage of Tech N9ne recording in studio is used for his verse.
6. This video was made in 2007 but it was unreleased due to business disagreements between director Josiah M. Jones and Strange Music. In 2011 the music video was leaked on YouTube.
