= Jae (given name) =

Name list

- Gender: Unisex

People with the given name Jae:

== Korean ==
- Jae (Korean name), a Korean given name
- Jae Hee (born 1980), South Korean actor
- Jae Ko, Korean artist
- Jae Lee (born 1972), Korean-American comics artist
- Jae Park (born 1992), Korean-American musician, singer, songwriter, rapper, and composer
- Jae Yoo (born 1989), South Korean model

== Non-Korean ==
- Jae Ang (born 1982), Singaporean singer
- Jae R. Ballif (born 1931), American author and provost
- Jae Kingi-Cross (born 1976), Australian basketball player
- Jae Crowder (born 1990), American basketball player
- Jae Deal (born 'unknown'), American composer, arranger, music producer, and orchestrator
- Jae Head (born 1996), American actor
- Jae Jarrell (born 1935), American artist
- Jae Liew (born 1990), Singaporean actress
- Jae Martin (born 1976), English football midfielder
- Jae Matthews (born 1988), American musician
- Jae Millz (born 1983), American rapper
- Jae Synth (born 1980), American music producer and disc jockey
- Jae Thaxton (born 1985), American football linebacker
- Jae (author) (born 1978), German author of lesbian fiction

== Fictional characters ==
- Jae Juun, a fictional character in the Star Wars Expanded Universe
- Jae Lee (Lost), a character on the television series Lost
