= Skatterman =

American rapper

- Born: Stacy Landis; December 3, 1978 (age 47)
- Origin: Kansas City, Missouri, U.S.
- Genres: Hip hop
- Occupations: Rapper, President at Biggshot Music and Films
- Years active: 1999–present
- Labels: Strange Music (2002–2009); Bigg Shot (2009–present)
- Website: Skatterman on Reverbnation

Stacy Landis, better known by his stage name Skatterman, is an American rapper from Kansas City, Missouri.

== Biography ==
Starting as a teen, the syllable spitter knocked out hits with different groups, starting with Southside Rollers in 1999. Skatterman met rapper Snug Brim in high school, and the two became longtime collaborators. When their 2001 album “Worth a Million” caught the attention of Tech N9ne and his label Strange Music, the duo signed on with Strange for a successful, seven-year run.

In 2009, differences in the direction of the marketing and promotion of the project and the group, however, would lead to a mutual parting of ways, and Skatterman & Snug Brim would leave the label. They would go on to release the Mixtape “This is Kansas City” to rave reviews.

In 2010, the group disbanded, and in 2011, Skatterman released his first official mixtape/album as a solo artist on his new imprint, "BiggShot Music and Films",. He looked to develop a new sound and forge a new direction from a now solitary and more personal point of view. With the inaugural Mixtape “The Cook Book: Recipe 1 in 2011” and the subsequent release in January 2012 of "The Cook Book; Recipe 2", the industry veteran broke new barriers and provided fans with a little more insight into life away from his previous label base.

Skatterman is featured on 15 songs spread over 13 Strange Music albums, including the favorite "Riot Maker" from Tech N9ne's Everready album. These albums have sold over 3 million copies collectively, with some sales numbers skewed lower due to physical sales on tour dates. Skatterman and Snug Brim also have the song "Murder By #s" on the critically acclaimed B.E.E.F. Movie Soundtrack.

Though the sounds are evolving, Skatterman is still the same person he's always been. Skatterman says. "I have a lot of trust issues -- I don't trust anybody. I'm antisocial, so when I have a show, I arrive solo. I have been an artist on a label and I have been a part of a group. This is finally my opportunity to do ME."

In 2018, Skatterman released the track No Time Outs, featuring Snug Brim, after the two had parted ways, hinting they might be making more music together.

== Skatterman and Snug Brim ==
Skatterman & Snug Brim is a rap duo from Kansas City, Missouri, best known for their song, Block Party.

After releasing projects separately, Skatterman (born Stacy Dewayne Landis[1]) and Snug Brim (born Aaron R. Henderson[1]) combined as a group. The duo released their first album, Worth A Million, in 2002 through Below Radar Records. On the cover, they were listed as "Skatterman & Snug Brim," but the inside of the case displayed "Skatterman & Snug Brim, AKA Yung Gunz." The "Yung Gunz" name was later dropped due to a conflict with another group with the same name but a different spelling. (Young Gunz)

== Strange Music ==
Strange Music
- Parent company: Strange Music Inc.
- Founded: 1999
- Founder: Travis O'Guin; Aaron "Tech N9ne" Yates
- Distributors: JCOR Ent. (2001); MSC Ent. (2002–2006); Fontana (2006–present)
- Genre: Hip hop
- Country of origin: U.S.
- Location: Lees Summit, Missouri
- Official website: www.StrangeMusicInc.net

Travis, an established businessman in the world of furniture, was looking to get into the music industry. He had been a fan of Tech N9ne's and had seen how his career was being handled.

Tech had several commitments and deals pulling him in several directions at the time. He was signed to Qwest Records as well as MidwestSide Records, he also had commitments with both QDIII's Soundlab and Sway & King Tech of The Wake Up Show. Travis came into the picture and offered Tech something he never had his label. They agreed upon a 50/50 setup, with Travis acting as president and Tech as vice president.

Their first venture was a deal with JCOR Entertainment to release Anghellic, though JCOR mishandled the album. They would then seek another 50/50 deal, this time with Mark Cerami (previously of Priority Records) & Dave Weiner (previously of JCOR Entertainment) who were doing their own joint label at the time, MSC Entertainment. The first album Absolute Power was a success, selling about 250,000 copies.

The label is now independent, no longer joined with MSC Entertainment, instead having a distribution deal through Fontana Distribution. Their first release under the deal with Fontana was Tech N9ne's 2006 effort, Everready (The Religion). While many albums were advertised for 2007 releases in the artwork for that album, only one release was seen in 2007 from Strange Music, Misery Loves Kompany.

In 2002, Skatterman and Snug Brim was the first group to officially sign with Strange Music. They recorded the album, Urban Legendz which was released in 2004. The single from the album, "Block Party," charted #24 on Billboard's Hot R&B/Hip-Hop Singles Sales in October of the same year.

Word on tha Streets was released August 12, 2008. The follow-up to their Urban Legendz album featured the songs: "I'm That Nigga", "Sukka Dukkas" and "Heartbreaker." Featured artists included Tech N9ne, Young Buck, Paul Wall and Rich The Factor.

On February 9, 2009, it was announced on Tech N9ne's official website that Skatterman & Snug Brim had decided to leave the Strange Music label after fulfilling their two-album commitment.

== Bigg Shot Music & Films ==
Bigg Shot Music & Films
- Founded: 2009
- Founder: Skatterman
- Distributor: 101 D
- Genre: Hip hop
- Country of origin: U.S.

After leaving Strange Music in early 2009, The duo revealed that they had started a new Independent Record Label, Bigg Shot Music & Films.

Plans for a new Skatterman & Snug Brim album were also included in this release, indicating that their third album Perseverance would be released through the label on September 1 via a two-album distribution deal with RYKO/Warner Bros. However, plans for the album were later dropped due to Snug Brim's decision to go back to school and work towards a 15-month certification in music marketing.

With "BIGGSHOT Music & Films", Skatterman released the inaugural Mixtape “This is Kansas City; Vol. 1(2010)”. Skatterman also moved forward and released The Cookbook; Recipe One,. and also the highly anticipated follow-up, "The Cook Book:Recipe Two" (2012), the industry veteran, breaks new barriers and provides fans with a little more insight into life away from his previous label base.

== Discography ==
=== Studio albums ===
Year	Album details	Peak chart positions	Sales	
Year	Album details	Top Heatseekers	Sales	
2002	Worth a Million: Released: 2002; Label: Below Radar Records; Format: CD	—		
2004	Urban Legendz: Released: March 23, 2004; Label: Strange Music/MSC Entertainment (MSC-1007 2); Format: CD	—		
2008	Word on tha Streets: Released: August 12, 2008; Label: Strange Music (SMI 49); Format: CD			
2009	This Is Kansas City: Released: January 23, 2009; Label: Biggshot Music and Films; Format: CD			
2009	The Cook Book; Recipe 1: Released: January 12, 2010; Label: Biggshot Music and Films (101-6401); Format: CD			
2010	The Cook Book; Recipe 2: Released: March 9, 2012; Label: Biggshot Music and Films; Format: CD	—	48	1,158
"—" indicates albums that did not chart.

=== Solo releases ===
==== Skatterman ====
- 1998: Southside Rollers
- 2009: The Cook Book: Recipe 1
- 2012: The Cook Book: Recipe Two

=== Music videos ===
- 2006: Tech N9ne - "Bout Ta Bubble"
- 2007: Snug Brim - Get It (Directed by Kirk "KoBayne")^{[7]}
- 2008: Skatterman & Snug Brim - Ups And Downs (Directed by "The Ebonie Jeneus")^{[8]}
- 2011: DVD featuring Skatterman - This is Easy (Directed by Dawon Hughes)
- 2011: Skatterman - Grown Man Bizness (Directed by: ATP & CutzIBN2 - Edited by: www.SMASHONUPRODUCTIONS.com)
- 2012: Skatterman - Get Tha DJ Drunk (Directed by Kirk "KoBayne")^{[9]}
- 2012: Skatterman - Rise II Power (Directed by CutzIBN2 & ATP - Edited by CutzIBN2)
- 2014: Skatterman - Im Back (Directed by CutzIBN2 & ATP - Edited by CutzIBN2)

==== Features ====
- 2002: Tech N9ne - "Gunz Will Bust" (featuring Money Hungry, Skatterman & Snug Brim)
- 2004: Kutt Calhoun - "In My Face" (featuring BG Bulletwound, Skatterman & Snug Brim)
- 2006: Tech N9ne - "Riot Maker" (featuring Skatterman & Snug Brim)
- 2007: Tech N9ne - "That Box" (featuring Greed, Krizz Kaliko, Kutt Calhoun, Skatterman & Snug Brim)
- 2008: Krizz Kaliko - "Crew Cut" (featuring BG Bulletwound, Kutt Calhoun, Makzilla, Skatterman & Snug Brim & Tech N9ne)
- 2008: Grave Plott - "In The Streets" (featuring BG Bulletwound, Kutt Calhoun & Skatterman & Snug Brim)
- 2008: Grave Plott - "Midwest" (featuring Skatterman & Snug Brim)
- 2008: Tech N9ne - "Seven Words" (featuring Krizz Kaliko & 'Skatterman')
- 2008: Kutt Calhoun - "Running Away (The Breakup)" (featuring Bishop, Skatterman)
- 2009: Krizz Kaliko - "Getcha Life Right" (featuring Skatterman & Snug Brim)
- 2009: Big Scoob - "Bring It 2 Tha Table" (featuring Skatterman)
- 2009 Tech N9ne- "B. Boy" (featuring Big Scoob, Bumpy Knuckles, Kutt Calhoun & Skatterman)
- 2011: Big Scoob - "Twistin Yay" (featuring Krizz Kaliko, Skatterman & Rappin Twan)
- 2011: Big Scoob - "DAMU" (featuring Skatterman, Bumpy Knuckles, Jay Rock & Messy Marv)
- 2011: Bloodstepp - Putcha Hands Up (Featuring Skatterman) from the album The Chainsaw Underworld
- 2012: Bloodstepp - Putcha Hands Up (Juggalo Gangsta Remix) (Featuring Skatterman) from the album Remixed And Chainsawed
- 2013: Bloodstepp - Putcha Hands Up Again (Featuring Skatterman & Snug Brim) from the album Bass And Bubblegum
- 2015: Windy City - Hawk Rising (featuring Skatterman - Prod. by Larry Elyea - Minds Eye Digital): Single from the forthcoming album "Cover Me"
