= Jae =

Jae or JAE may refer to:

- Jae (given name), including a list of people with the name
- Jae (Korean name), including a list of people with the name
- Jae (author), German author
- JAE (Japan Aviation Electronics), a corporation specializing in the manufacture and sales of electrical connectors
- ISO 639:jae, code for Yabem, an Austronesian language
- JAE, ICAO code for Jade Cargo International, a defunct Chinese airline
- Joint Admission Examination, an examination for higher education in Macau

== See also ==
- Jae, Gyebal, a 2003 album by South Korean hip-hop duo Leessang
- Jae barb (Enteromius Jae), a species of ray-finned fish
