= Anghellic =

Studio album by Tech N9ne
- Released: August 28, 2001
- Recorded: 1999–2001
- Genres: Hardcore hip-hop; horrorcore; G-funk; gangsta rap
- Length: 75:55
- Labels: Strange Music; JCOR
- Producers: Travis O'Guin (exec.); QDIII (exec.); DJ Icy Roc Kravyn; Don Juan; Grant Rice; John Carpenter; King Tech; Richie; RonnZfromBerlin; Tech N9ne; Will The Weirdo

Tech N9ne chronology
The Worst (2000)	Anghellic (2001)	Celcius (2002)

Promotional cover art (Note: Another promotional cover art features a white background instead of a black one.)

Singles from Anghellic
- 1. "It's Alive" Released: 2001

Professional ratings
Review scores
Source	Rating
AllMusic	3/5 stars
The Source	3/5 stars
XXL	(M)

Anghellic is the third studio album and national debut studio album by American rapper Tech N9ne from Kansas City, Missouri. It was released on August 28, 2001, by JCOR Entertainment, and was re-released as Anghellic: Reparation in 2003 via Strange Music after conflicts with JCOR Entertainment during its original release. The album peaked at number 59 on the Billboard 200.

In 2001, the song "Tormented" appeared in a scene of the television series Dark Angel, playing for nearly two minutes in the background of a bar scene in the season two episode "Two". In 2009, Fangoria named it as an iconic horrorcore album.

== Track listing ==
Anghellic
No.	Title	Writer(s)	Producer(s)	Length
1.	"Hellevator"	Aaron D. Yates	Richie	0:40
2.	"Tormented"	Yates; Grantland Rice	Don Juan	4:23
3.	"Stamina"	Yates	Tech N9ne; Don Juan	0:14
4.	"Sinister Tech"	Yates	William "Will The Weirdo" Wilson; Sean "DJ Icy Roc Kravyn" Raspberry	3:49
5.	"Psycho Messages"	Yates; Whitney A. Simonet; DeJuan Cayson; Dyamund Sheilds	Don Juan	1:03
6.	"Psycho Bitch"	Yates	Don Juan; John Carpenter	4:02
7.	"Real Killer"	Yates	King Tech	2:38
8.	"Cursed"	Yates	Don Juan	5:00
9.	"Suicide Letters"	Yates	Don Juan	4:09
10.	"Purgatory"	Samuel Christopher Watson	Grant Rice	0:42
11.	"It's Alive"	Yates	Sean "DJ Icy Roc Kravyn" Raspberry	5:02
12.	"Einstein"	Yates	Don Juan	3:58
13.	"P.R. 2K1"	Yates	Don Juan; Tech N9ne^{[a]}	4:14
14.	"Here I Come"	Aaron Yates	Don Juan	4:59
15.	"Who You Came To See"	Aaron Yates	Ronnie "RonnZfromBerlin" Blache	4:43
16.	"Wake Up Call"	Yates; Rice; Travis O'Guin	Richie	0:43
17.	"This Ring"	Yates; Rice; Melvin Calhoun Jr.	Sean "DJ Icy Roc Kravyn" Raspberry	6:19
18.	"God Complex"	Yates	Don Juan	5:19
19.	"This Life (Anghellic)"	Yates; Rice; Amjad Bakarii; Tyrone Kendall	RonnZfromBerlin	4:23
20.	"Going Bad"	Yates	Sean "DJ Icy Roc Kravyn" Raspberry	5:45
21.	"Heaven"	Yates	Richie	1:00
22.	"Twisted"	Yates	Don Juan	6:37
Total length:				75:55

Notes

- ^{^[a]} signifies a co-producer

=== Track listing ===
Anghellic (Reparation)
No.	Title	Writer(s)	Producer(s)	Length
1.	"Devil Boy"	Aaron D. Yates	5150 Mental Productions	4:32
2.	"Hellevator"	Yates	Richie	0:16
3.	"Tormented" (featuring Grant Rice)	Yates; Grantland Rice	Don Juan	4:23
4.	"Stamina"	Yates	Don Juan; Tech N9ne	0:14
5.	"Sinister Tech"	Yates	Icy Roc Kravyn; Will The Weirdo	3:25
6.	"Psycho Messages"	Yates; Whitney A. Simonet; DeJuan Cayson; Dyamund Sheilds	Don Juan	1:03
7.	"Psycho Bitch"	Yates	Don Juan; John Carpenter	4:31
8.	"Real Killer"	Yates	King Tech	2:38
9.	"Cursed"	Yates	Don Juan	4:36
10.	"Suicide Letters" (featuring Nichia Cayson)	Yates	Don Juan	4:06
11.	"Purgatory"	Samuel Christopher Watson	Grant Rice	0:21
12.	"It's Alive"	Yates	Icy Roc Kravyn	5:01
13.	"Einstein Tech N9ne"	Yates; Bobby Orlando	Don Juan	3:57
14.	"Breathe"	Yates; W. Jefferson	RonnZfromBerlin	4:22
15.	"Who You Came to See" (featuring Big Krizz Kaliko)	Yates	RonnZfromBerlin	4:19
16.	"Wake Up Call"	Yates; Rice; Travis O'Guin	Richie	0:43
17.	"This Ring"	Yates; Rice; Melvin Calhoun Jr.	Icy Roc Kravyn	5:56
18.	"God Complex"	Yates	Don Juan	4:55
19.	"F.T.I." (featuring Greed, Big Krizz Kaliko, Kutt Calhoun, Skatterman & Snug Brim)	Yates; Roy LaJeune; Watson; Calhoun; Stacy Landis; Aaron Henderson	RUBONYX	5:24
20.	"Going Bad" (featuring Charmelle Cofield)	Yates	Icy Roc Kravyn	5:46
21.	"Heaven"	Yates	Richie	0:36
22.	"Twisted" (featuring Nichia Cayson and Roger Troutman)	Yates	Don Juan	6:14
Total length:				77:18

Sample credits

Hellevator

- Clips from Hellraiser

Sinister Tech

- Uses the roar of Gabara in the film Godzilla's Revenge

Psycho Messages / Psycho Bitch

- "Halloween theme" by John Carpenter

Here I Come

- "Für Elise" by Ludwig van Beethoven

Twisted

- "I Want to Be Your Man" by Zapp & Roger
- "Computer Love" by Zapp & Roger

Einstein

- "Einstein" by Bobby Orlando released as The Beat Box Boys (1984) features the voice and music of Bobby Orlando.

PR 2K1- sampled from Drag Rap by the showboys

== Charts ==
2001 chart performance for Anghellic
Chart (2001)	Peak position
US Billboard 200	59
US Top R&B/Hip-Hop Albums (Billboard)	50

2003 chart performance for Anghellic
Chart (2003)	Peak position
US Independent Albums (Billboard)	46
