= Jae-sang =

Jae-sang may refer to:

- Park Jae-sang (born 1982) South Korean baseball player
- Park Jae-sang, known professionally as PSY (born 1977), Korean hip-hop artist
- JS Food Plan, founded by Jeong Jae-sang

== See also ==
- Jae (disambiguation)
- Sang (disambiguation)
