= Absolute Power (Tech N9ne album) =

Studio album by Tech N9ne
- Released: September 10, 2002
- Recorded: 2001–02
- Genre: Hardcore hip-hop; horrorcore; gangsta rap
- Length: 78:27
- Label: Strange Music
- Producer: Dave Weiner (exec.); Travis O'Guin (exec.); 5150 Mental Productions; Carl Breeding; Carlos "Big Los" Chalmers; DJ Icy Roc Kravyn; Femi Ojetunde; Flash Technology; Robert Rebeck; RonnZfromBerlin; RUBONYX

Tech N9ne chronology
Celcius (2002)	Absolute Power (2002)	Vintage Tech (2005)

Singles from Absolute Power
- 1. "Slacker" Released: 2002; 2. "Imma Tell" Released: 2003; 3. "Here Comes Tecca Nina" Released: 2004; 4. "I'm A Playa" Released: 2004

Professional ratings
Review scores
Source	Rating
AllMusic	4/5 stars
RapReviews	8/10

Absolute Power is the fourth studio album by American rapper Tech N9ne from Kansas City, Missouri, and is officially his very first album released through his Strange Music label. Production was handled by several record producers, including Reuben 'Bonyx' Armstrong, RonnZfromBerlin and 5150 Mental Productions. It features guest appearances from 57th Street Rogue Dog Villains, D12, Krizz Kaliko, Kutt Calhoun, Skatterman & Snug Brim among others.

The album peaked at number 79 on the Billboard 200.

The hook for the song I'm A Playa samples and is inspired by the song Rock Me Amadeus by Falco.

== Track listing ==
Absolute Power
No.	Title	Writer(s)	Producer(s)	Length
1.	"Intro"			1:00
2.	"The Industry Is Punks"	Aaron D. Yates	RUBONYX	5:30
3.	"Here Comes Tecca Nina"	Yates	Carl Breeding; Flash Technology	3:54
4.	"Imma Tell"	Yates	RUBONYX	4:46
5.	"Slacker"	Yates	Femi Ojetunde	4:16
6.	"Keep On Keepin' On" (featuring Big Krizz Kaliko)	Yates; Samuel Christopher Watson	RUBONYX	5:01
7.	"Gunz Will Bust" (featuring Yung Gunz)	Yates; Stacy Landis; Aaron Henderson; Terrance "Money Hungry" Morris	Carlos "Big Los" Chalmers	4:45
8.	"Bianca's and Beatrice's" (featuring Kutt Calhoun)	Yates; Melvin Calhoun Jr.	RUBONYX	4:16
9.	"Diamond Joe's" (Interlude)			0:21
10.	"Slither"	Yates	RonnZfromBerlin	3:55
11.	"Disturbance" (Interlude)			0:07
12.	"Trapped in a Psycho's Body"	Yates	RonnZfromBerlin	5:08
13.	"T9X"	Yates	Sean "DJ Icy Roc Kravyn" Raspberry	6:28
14.	"She Devil" (featuring D12)	Yates; DeShaun Holton; Denaun Porter; Ondre Moore; Rufus Johnson; Von Carlisle	RonnZfromBerlin	4:42
15.	"Worst Enemy"	Yates	RUBONYX	2:39
16.	"Signing Off" (Interlude)			0:05
17.	"Absolute Power"	Yates; Watson	RonnZfromBerlin	4:25
18.	"Yada, Yada, Yada"	Yates	5150 Mental Productions	6:10
19.	"Constantly Dirty" (featuring 57th Street Rogue Dog Villains)	Yates; Michael Whitebear; Stewart Ashby; William Oats	5150 Mental Productions	6:00
20.	"I'm a Playa" (featuring Big Krizz Kaliko)	Yates; Watson	Rob Rebeck	4:59
Total length:				78:27

More Power
No.	Title	Writer(s)	Producer(s)	Length
21.	"Victory"	Aaron D. Yates	RonnZfromBerlin	4:40
22.	"Freaky Lil' Things" (featuring Grant Rice and Kutt Calhoun)	Yates; Grant Rice; Melvin Calhoun Jr.	RonnZfromBerlin	5:27
23.	"Hydro" (featuring Greed, Big Krizz Kaliko and Kutt Calhoun)	Yates; Roy LaJeune; Samuel Christopher Watson; Calhoun	5150 Mental Productions	4:49
24.	"Runaway" (featuring Erica Hugunin)	Yates; Erica Hugunin	RUBONYX	4:29
25.	"Shocked" (featuring Kutt Calhoun)	Yates; Calhoun	RUBONYX	4:51
26.	"The Grench" (featuring Boy Big)	Yates; Levar Fletcher	RonnZfromBerlin	5:00
27.	"Walk With a Limp" (performed by Kutt Calhoun featuring Big Krizz Kaliko)		5150 Mental Productions	4:48
Total length:				34:04

== Charts ==
Chart (2002)	Peak position
US Billboard 200	79
US Top R&B/Hip-Hop Albums (Billboard)	28
US Independent Albums (Billboard)	3

== Certifications ==
Region	Certification	Certified units/sales
United States (RIAA)	Gold	500,000^{‡}
^{‡} Sales+streaming figures based on certification alone.
