= Reuben 'Bonyx' Armstrong =

American producer and R&B artist (born 1980)

Bonyx
- Also known as: RUBONYX, Mr. Jellybounce, Genius RBX
- Born: Reuben Daniel Armstrong; March 29, 1980 (age 46); Shawnee Mission, Kansas, United States
- Origin: Olathe, Kansas, United States
- Genres: Hip hop, Pop, R&B, Reggaeton, Rock
- Occupation: Producer
- Years active: 1997–present
- Member of: Tekneko Bros.

Reuben Daniel Armstrong (born March 29, 1980, in Shawnee Mission, Kansas) better known by his stage name Bonyx and RUBONYX, is an American producer and R&B artist. Best known for his production, working with independent artists Tech N9ne and Skatterman & Snug Brim. He produced Skatterman & Snug Brim's single, "Block Party," which charted #24 on Billboard's Hot R&B/Hip-Hop Singles Sales chart.

== Career ==
At the age of 17, Armstrong started to attend a local Kansas City studio called Faculty Sound. During his days at Faculty Sound he was introduced to the music industry and learned the business through associates, Godren T. Duckett, Theodis Brown, and Vonzell & Adrian Washington, etc. Armstrong produced a variety of beats for local rap & R&B artists including “Boy Big” a.k.a. Big Boy Levar and associate producer, Tom Woosley of Woo Woo Productions, with his first underground LP, All Sides.

In his days with Faculty Sound, Armstrong was introduced to various music players including Suge Knight’s brother, Big Wes Crockett. Faculty Sound eventually folded due to improper business management.

=== Tekneko Bros. ===
Tekneko Bros.
- Genres: Hip hop
- Occupation: Production Team
- Years active: 14 years
- Members: Antonio "Elmo" Wesley; Reuben "RUBONYX" Armstrong; William "Dee" Armstrong

Armstrong, along with his younger brother, William ‘Dee’ Armstrong, had met Antonio ‘Elmo’ Wesley at Faculty Sound, and the three of them decided to join forces and start Tekneko Bros. production team.

In 2001 Armstrong was contacted by Aaron ‘Tech N9ne’ Yates and Travis O’Guinn, about producing on Yates’ Absolute Power album. Armstrong along with Tekneko produced 7 of the 23 tracks, including one of the singles, "Imma Tell." Tekneko also produced albums for Strange Music artists, Kutt Calhoun and Skatterman & Snug Brim which included Skatterman & Snug Brim's single, "Block Party." Through Yates and the Strange Music label, Armstrong along with Tekneko were introduced and worked with several other artists including Bubba Sparxxx and Big V from Nappy Roots.

=== Recent career moves ===
Currently, Armstrong has expanded his horizons in not only composing, engineering and graphic arts, but also in directing local music videos with film companies such as: GMF Films, SKILYNE RECORDINGS formally YANEZ Entertainment, and Fylmwerks. Armstrong is finishing a project with up-and-coming hip-hop sensation GGL3, whose album is titled The Weekend. He is also putting the finishing touches on his first solo R&B album entitled Nightlife, which is scheduled to release in 2009.

== Production discography ==
Year	Artist	Album	Title
1999	Big Boy Lavar	All Sides	Die For
1999	Big Boy Lavar	All Sides	Destiny
2002	Tech N9ne	Absolute Power	Bianca's and Beatrice's (featuring Kutt Calhoun)
2002	Tech N9ne	Absolute Power	Imma Tell
2002	Tech N9ne	Absolute Power	Industry Is Punks
2002	Tech N9ne	Absolute Power	Keep On Keepin' On (featuring Krizz Kaliko)
2002	Tech N9ne	Absolute Power	Runaway (featuring Erica Hugunin)
2002	Tech N9ne	Absolute Power	Shocked (featuring Kutt Calhoun)
2002	Tech N9ne	Absolute Power	Worst Enemy
2002	Soundtrack	Tupac Shakur: Thug Angel: The Life of an Outlaw	Keep On Keepin' On (performed by Tech N9ne featuring Krizz Kaliko)
2003	Trajik	1ne Of A Kind	In My City (featuring BoChamp, Hobo Tone, Krizz Kaliko & Tech N9ne)
2003	Soundtrack	Beef	Beef (performed by Tech N9ne featuring Krizz Kaliko)
2003	Soundtrack	Beef	Snake Ya (performed by Tech N9ne featuring Krizz Kaliko)
2004	Kutt Calhoun	B.L.E.V.E.	Got Plans (featuring Krizz Kaliko)
2004	Kutt Calhoun	B.L.E.V.E.	Hip Hop Warning
2004	Kutt Calhoun	B.L.E.V.E.	Nationality (Parlaa Remix) (featuring Krizz Kaliko)
2004	Kutt Calhoun	B.L.E.V.E.	Panic Box (featuring Boy Big & Tech N9ne)
2004	Kutt Calhoun	B.L.E.V.E.	Parlaa (featuring Krizz Kaliko)
2004	Kutt Calhoun	B.L.E.V.E.	Real Sex (featuring Tech N9ne)
2004	Skatterman & Snug Brim	Urban Legendz	Block Party
2004	Skatterman & Snug Brim	Urban Legendz	Carwash (featuring BG Bulletwound & Kutt Calhoun)
2004	Skatterman & Snug Brim	Urban Legendz	Crazy (featuring Kutt Calhoun)
2004	Skatterman & Snug Brim	Urban Legendz	Heart & Soul
2004	Skatterman & Snug Brim	Urban Legendz	Kansas City (Concrete Jungle) (featuring BG Bulletwound, Greed, Krizz Kaliko & Kutt Calhoun)
2004	Skatterman & Snug Brim	Urban Legendz	Lapdance (featuring Krizz Kaliko & Tech N9ne)
2004	Skatterman & Snug Brim	Urban Legendz	Life In The Game (featuring Krizz Kaliko)
2004	Skatterman & Snug Brim	Urban Legendz	Pakman (featuring Kutt Calhoun & Tech N9ne)
2004	Skatterman & Snug Brim	Urban Legendz	Say Whatcha Say
2004	Skatterman & Snug Brim	Urban Legendz	Shut It Down
2005	Tech N9ne	Vintage Tech	Beef (featuring Krizz Kaliko)
2005	Tech N9ne	Vintage Tech	Snake Ya (featuring Krizz Kaliko)
2006	Tech N9ne	Everready (The Religion)	Hood Connection, Strange Commercial
2009	Various Artists	Strange Music - We Got This '09 (Sampler)	Like I Died
2009	Tech N9ne	K.O.D.	Blackened The Sun
2009	Tech N9ne	K.O.D.	In The Trunk
2009	Tech N9ne	K.O.D.	Low
2010	Tech N9ne	The Lost Scripts of K.O.D.	Like I Died (Remix) (featuring Craig Smith & Krizz Kaliko)

== Documentary DVD ==
- 2004: Tech N9ne – T9X: The Tech N9ne Experience

== Music videos ==
- 2007: “Jelly Bounce” by Mr. Jellybounce, MAG & Young Slim
- 2007: “Parkin’ Lot Pimpin’” by Royalty ft. Bonyx
- 2008: “What It Is” by Kredulous ft. 3rd Degree
- 2008: “Lovin’ It” by A-Squad / 211 M.G.I.
- 2008: “Get Faded” by KALAB
- 2008: “My Star” by RJ ft. Bonyx
- 2009: "Drunk Game" B4 and GGL3
