= Boiling Point (EP) =

Boiling Point (K.O.D. Collection)

EP by Tech N9ne
- Released: October 30, 2012
- Recorded: 2012
- Genre: Hip hop
- Label: Strange Music
- Producer: Seven

Tech N9ne chronology
E.B.A.H. (2012)	Boiling Point (K.O.D. Collection) (2012)	Therapy: Sessions With Ross Robinson (2013)

Professional ratings
Review scores
Source	Rating
HipHopDX	3.5/5
XXL	3/5 (L)

Boiling Point (K.O.D. Collection) is the fifth extended play by American rapper Tech N9ne. It was released on October 30, 2012, through Strange Music. Produced entirely by Michael "Seven" Summers, it is broken up into sections 'Anger', 'Madness' and 'The Hole', similar to 2009's K.O.D. album. It features guest appearances from Krizz Kaliko, Aqualeo, Bishop, Brotha Lynch Hung, Ezikuhl and Smackola.

The EP debuted at number 30 on the Billboard 200 and number 5 on the Top R&B/Hip-Hop Albums with the first-week sales of 13,000 units in the US.

== Track listing ==
No.	Title	Writer(s)	Length
1.	"Uralya"	Aaron D. Yates; Michael Summers	4:08
2.	"Fire in AC" (featuring Krizz Kaliko and Smackola)	Yates; Samuel Watson; Thomas A. Chapman; Summers	3:47
3.	"Should I Killer"	Yates; Summers	3:59
4.	"Hunger" (featuring Brotha Lynch Hung and Bishop)	Yates; Kevin Mann; Christopher Frazier; Summers	4:49
5.	"Paint On Your Pillowcase" (featuring Aqualeo)	Yates; Acie L. High; Eric Mitchell; Summers	4:37
6.	"Heavy"	Yates; Manzilla Marquis Queen; Summers	4:08
7.	"Alone" (featuring Krizz Kaliko and Ezikuhl)	Yates; Watson; Erick Boone; Summers	4:38

== Personnel ==
- Aaron D. "Tech N9ne" Yates – vocals
- Samuel "Krizz Kaliko" Watson – additional vocals (tracks: 1, 2, 4, 6, 7)
- Thomas A. "Smackola" Chapman – additional vocals (track 2)
- AP – additional vocals (track 3)
- Kevin "Brotha Lynch Hung" Mann – additional vocals (track 4)
- Christopher "Bishop" Frazier – additional vocals (track 4)
- Acie "Aqualeo" High – additional vocals (track 5)
- Anita "A1 Thou Wow" Hilanthom – additional vocals (track 5)
- Alexandra Devoe – additional vocals (track 6)
- Samuel Watson Jr. – additional vocals (track 6)
- Neil Simpson – additional vocals (track 6)
- Erick "Ezikuhl" Boone – additional vocals (track 7)
- Michael "Seven" Summers – producer
- Ben Cybulsky – mixing
- Tom Baker – mastering
- Travis O'Guin – executive producer

== Charts ==
Chart (2012)	Peak position
US Billboard 200	30
US Top R&B/Hip-Hop Albums (Billboard)	5
US Top Rap Albums (Billboard)	3
US Independent Albums (Billboard)	4
