= Seepage (EP) =

EP by Tech N9ne
- Released: October 25, 2010
- Recorded: 2010
- Genre: Horrorcore
- Length: 17:34
- Label: Strange Music
- Producers: Travis O'Guin (exec.), Ben Cybulski, David Sanders II, Matic Lee, Ozone Beats, Seven

Tech N9ne chronology
The Gates Mixed Plate (2010)	Seepage (2010)	Bad Season (2010)

Seepage is the second EP by rapper Tech N9ne, and was released on October 25, 2010. The EP consists of five tracks that were written recently after Tech witnessed Krizz Kaliko's breakdown after receiving bad news, and soon after, receiving news that his mother was back in the psych ward. The beats that appear on the EP were purchased by the artist intended for his studio album K.O.D. but went unused during the sessions. The EP, just like K.O.D. and the Lost Scripts, is broken up into 3 sections: "Anger", "Madness" and "The Hole". When the instrumentals used in Seepage were slated for the K.O.D album, Tech N9ne intended for the track titled 'Alucard' to feature Immortal Technique on a track called 'Every Man For Himself.' Necro revealed on Twitter that Tech reached out to him for the track 'Asshole' but wasn't able to send out his verse on time. The EP sold 7,361 copies first week, of which 68% were digital. Seepage debuted at number 57 on the Billboard 200 and number 5 on the Independent Albums charts in the US. The songs' title track featuring Tonesha Sanders peaked at #49 on the R&B/Hip-Hop Digital Songs chart and #35 on the Rao Digital Songs chart.

== Track listing ==
No.	Title	Writer(s)	Producer(s)	Length
1.	"Choking From It (Skit)"		Ben Cybulski	1:05
2.	"Seepage" (featuring Tonesha Sanders)	A. Yates	David Sanders II	3:05
3.	"Asshole" (featuring Big Scoob & Krizz Kaliko)	A. Yates, S. Ashby, S. Watson	David Sanders II	4:02
4.	"Alucard"	A. Yates	Matic Lee	3:28
5.	"Bite Me" (featuring Tonesha Sanders & Jessica Slankard)	A. Yates	Seven	1:52
6.	"Trippin Comin" (featuring Krizz Kaliko)	A. Yates	Ozone Beats	4:07
Total length:				17:34
