= Bad Season =

Mixtape by Tech N9ne
- Released: December 23, 2010 / February 1, 2011 (CD)
- Recorded: 2010
- Genre: Hardcore hip hop; alternative hip hop; underground hip hop; gangsta rap
- Length: 57:38
- Label: Strange; XXL
- Producer: Cookin' Soul; The Haitian Super Heroes; Dr. Dre; Travis Barker; IcyRoc Kravyn; Polyhedron; Seven; Mike Dupree

Tech N9ne chronology
Seepage (2010)	Bad Season (2010)	All 6's and 7's (2011)

Professional ratings
Review scores
Source	Rating
AllMusic	2011

Bad Season is the debut mixtape by Tech N9ne released on December 23, 2010, for free digital download. The mixtape was presented by XXL Magazine and it was hosted by DJ Whoo Kid and DJ Scream. It contains 14 all-new tracks submitted by DJ Whoo Kid for Tech N9ne to rap over without prior knowledge of who produced any of the beats. Also included are three tracks from previous Tech N9ne releases. Dr. Dre, the Haitian Super Heroes (DJ Whoo Kid & Red Spyda), Travis Barker and Cookin' Soul were later revealed as producers for the mixtape. The mixtape features guest appearances from Krizz Kaliko, Kutt Calhoun, Jay Rock, Big Scoob, Oobergeek, Irv Da Phenom, Nesto and others. The track "Hard Liquor" was originally by The Game with production by Dr. Dre intended for his Doctor's Advocate album, but it did not make the final track listing. After the track was submitted to Whoo Kid, he then submitted it to Travis Barker to remix the track, without Tech N9ne having knowledge of the remix.

== Re-release ==
The mixtape was re-released through digital retailers on January 25, 2011, with physical copies being sold by the label through their web-store. The physical release was originally set for release on January 25, but due to high demand in pre-order sales, it was delayed to February 1, 2011. The retail version removes the track "Hard Liquor", as well as the tracks that had been previously released on Tech N9ne albums. The re-release adds one brand new track featuring Royce Da 5'9" as well as three a cappella verses that the artist had recorded for guest appearances with other artists. The re-release charted at #118 on the Billboard 200, selling 4,400 copies in its first week of release.

== Track listing ==
Free mixtape edition
No.	Title	Producer(s)	Length
1.	"Bad Season Skit" (featuring Jeff Nelson)		1:17
2.	"Table and Chest Stress"		2:05
3.	"Sex to the Beat" (featuring Bizzy, Krizz Kaliko & Kutt Calhoun)	Cookin' Soul	4:08
4.	"No More Music by the Suckas" (featuring Black Vain, Krizz Kaliko & Oobergeek)	The Haitian Super Heroes	3:48
5.	"Bad Season" (featuring Krizz Kaliko, Nesto & Tonesha Sanders)	The Haitian Super Heroes	3:15
6.	"Somethin' to See" (featuring Irv Da Phenom & Krizz Kaliko)	The Haitian Super Heroes	3:56
7.	"Ego Trippin'" (featuring Krizz Kaliko)	The Haitian Super Heroes	1:51
8.	"All Day All Night" (featuring Krizz Kaliko)	Cookin' Soul	3:26
9.	"Hard Liquor" (featuring Kokane)	Dr. Dre; Travis Barker	3:54
10.	"Livin' Like I'm Dyin'" (featuring Krizz Kaliko, Kutt Calhoun & CES Cru)	The Haitian Super Heroes	4:34
11.	"Down for the Block" (featuring Big Scoob, Jay Rock & Kutt Calhoun)	The Haitian Super Heroes	4:23
12.	"Lick Your Teeth" (featuring Irv Da Phenom, Krizz Kaliko & Tonesha Sanders)	The Haitian Super Heroes	2:29
13.	"Losin' My Mind"	The Haitian Super Heroes	2:02
14.	"The People Speak Skit"		0:48
15.	"This Ring" (featuring Dontez Yates) (From Anghellic)	IcyRoc Kravyn	5:12
16.	"This Ring Outro"	IcyRoc Kravyn	0:26
17.	"The Rain" (featuring Alyia Yates, Lecoya Lejeune & Reign Yates) (from Everready (The Religion))	Polyhedron	4:16
18.	"Come Gangsta" (featuring Krizz Kaliko) From Everready (The Religion))	Seven	5:42
Total length:			57:38

Retail mixtape edition
No.	Title	Producer(s)	Length
1.	"Bad Season Skit" (featuring Jeff Nelson)		1:12
2.	"Table and Chest Stress"		2:05
3.	"Sex to the Beat" (featuring Bizzy, Krizz Kaliko & Kutt Calhoun)	Cookin' Soul	4:10
4.	"No More Music by the Suckas" (featuring Black Vain, Krizz Kaliko & Oobergeek)	The Haitian Super Heroes	3:48
5.	"Bad Season" (featuring Krizz Kaliko, Nesto & Tonesha Sanders)	The Haitian Super Heroes	3:27
6.	"Somethin' to See" (featuring Irv Da Phenom & Krizz Kaliko)	The Haitian Super Heroes	3:55
7.	"Ego Trippin'" (featuring Krizz Kaliko)	The Haitian Super Heroes	1:50
8.	"All Day All Night" (featuring Krizz Kaliko)	Cookin' Soul	3:28
9.	"Livin' Like I'm Dyin'" (featuring Krizz Kaliko, Kutt Calhoun & CES Cru)	The Haitian Super Heroes	5:10
10.	"Down for the Block" (featuring Big Scoob, Jay Rock & Kutt Calhoun)	The Haitian Super Heroes	4:23
11.	"Lick Your Teeth" (featuring Irv Da Phenom, Krizz Kaliko & Tonesha Sanders)	The Haitian Super Heroes	2:31
12.	"Losin' My Mind"	The Haitian Super Heroes	3:06
13.	"Curious (What Up Wit Ya Girl)" (featuring Irv Da Phenom & Royce Da 5'9")	Mike Dupree	4:30
14.	"Speed of Sound (Acapella)"		1:08
15.	"Blammers and Burners (Acapella)"		1:24
16.	"Move (Acapella Remix)"		1:03
Total length:			47:10
