= Jae (Korean name) =

- Hangul: 재
- RR: Jae
- MR: Chae

Jae, also Chae, is a Korean given name. Notable people with the name include:

- Kil Chae (1353–1419), Goryeo and early Joseon dynasty neo-Confucian scholar
- Hur Jae (born 1965), South Korean basketball coach and former player

Korean people who have shortened their full names to Jae in English include:

- Jae U. Jung (born Jung Jae-ung, 1960), South Korean biologist
- Jae Chong (born Chong Jae-yun, 1972), American music producer
- Jae Seo (born Seo Jae-woong, 1977), South Korean baseball player
- Jae Yoo (born Yoo Hyuk-jae, 1989), South Korean model
- Jaejae (born Lee Eun-jae, 1990), South Korean television personality
- Jae Park (born Park Jae-hyung, 1992), Argentine-born American singer
