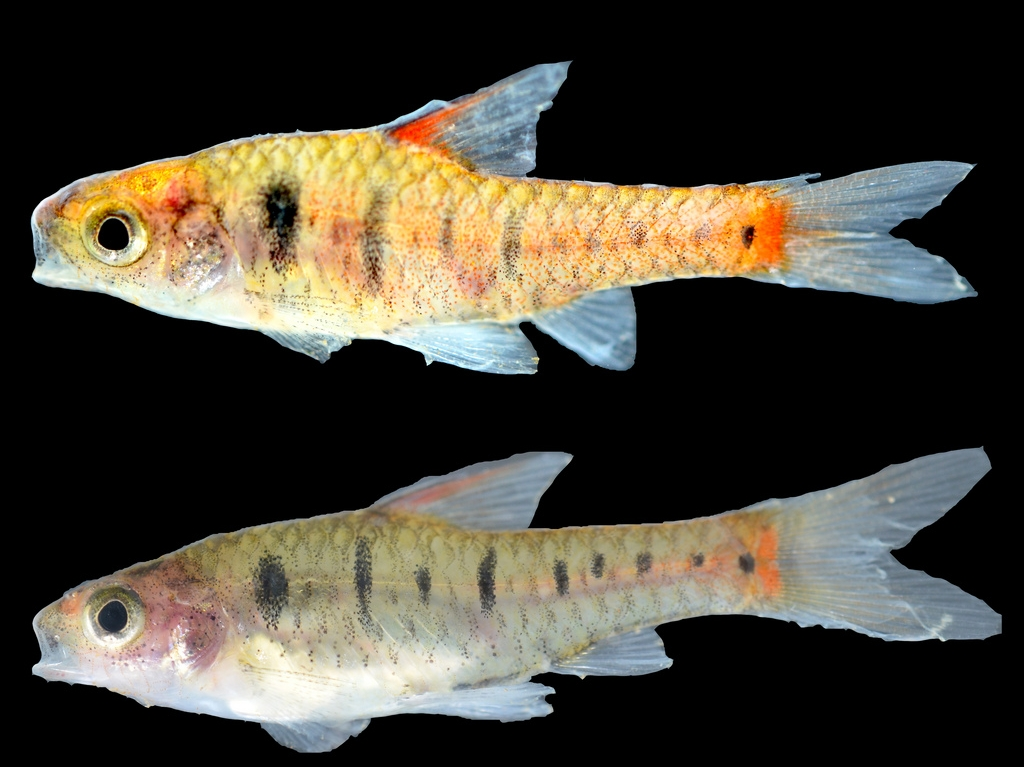
- Male (top) and female

Conservation status
- Least Concern (IUCN 3.1)

Scientific classification
- Kingdom: Animalia
- Phylum: Chordata
- Class: Actinopterygii
- Division: Teleostei
- Order: Cypriniformes
- Family: Cyprinidae
- Subfamily: Smiliogastrinae
- Genus: Enteromius
- Species: E. jae

Binomial name
- Enteromius jae (Boulenger), 1903

Synonyms
- Barbus jae Boulenger 1903

= Jae barb =

Species of fish

Jae barb, or Dja barb, (Enteromius jae) is a species of cyprinid fish which like other sub-Saharan "barbs" was formerly placed in the genus Barbus, it has now been reallocated to Enteromius.

== Description ==
The jae barb is a small fish which grows to 4 cm (1.6 in) in length. They have red fins brighter in the males than in the females, while the body is predominantly beige-brown in colour. In addition the females are larger and bulkier than the males. Fish collected from different locations are known to vary in both colour and patterning, for example male fish from the River Nyong basin close to Sombo in Cameroon turn uniform blood red in colour when in breeding while fish collected around Awae, which is also in the Nyong but further upstream, only turn red on the rear half of the body. Individuals collected from other places within Cameroon such as the River Sanaga, River Ntem and River Dja exhibit similar, often subtle, differences. Further south in Gabon individuals have been recorded which have an almost completely grey body colour counterpointed with deep red to black dorsal and ventral fins in mature male fish.

== Habitat ==
The jae barb lives in slow-moving, shallow, shaded rainforest streams and swamps with dense emergent vegetation.

== Distribution ==
The jae barb is found from western central Africa from the River Wouri in Cameroon to the River Kouilou-Niari in the Republic of Congo and the River Chiloango basin. It is also found in the lower, middle and upper Congo River basin in Cameroon, Republic of Congo and Democratic Republic of the Congo.

== Biology ==
The jae barb is probably a micropredator feeding mainly on insect larvae and small crustaceans.

== Conservation status ==
The Jae barb is a widespread species and no major threats have been identified, it has a wide range throughout central Africa and is assessed as Least Concern.

== Taxonomy ==
The genus Barbus sensu lato contained over 340 putative species and was considered polyphyletic. It was proposed that only the European, Southwest Asian and North African representatives should be included in Barbus sensu stricto with around 20 species and that all of the species of Barbus sensu lato should be allocated to an already existing genus but if no previous genus has been allocated then they should be referred to as "Barbus" on an interim basis. The small African species were placed in the genus Enteromius.
