= K.O.D. (Tech N9ne album) =

Studio album by Tech N9ne
- Released: October 27, 2009
- Recorded: 2009
- Genre: Hardcore hip-hop; horrorcore; crunk; gangsta rap
- Length: 77:52
- Label: Strange Music
- Producer: Karbon; Matic Lee; Rob Rebeck; Ruben Armstrong; Seven; Travis O'Guin; Young Fyre

Tech N9ne chronology
Tech N9ne: The Box Set (2009)	K.O.D. (2009)	The Lost Scripts of K.O.D. (2010)

Singles from K.O.D.
- 1. "Strange Music Box" Released: October 9, 2009; 2. "Leave Me Alone" Released: October 20, 2009; 3. "Show Me a God" Released: October 20, 2009; 4. "Low" Released: December 3, 2009

Professional ratings
Review scores
Source	Rating
AllMusic	3.5/5 stars
Billboard	(84/100)
HipHopDX	4/5 stars
RapReviews	(9/10)
The Country Gazette	(Favorable)

K.O.D. (initialism for King of Darkness) is the ninth studio album by American rapper Tech N9ne; it was released on October 27, 2009, by Strange Music. The album features guest appearances from Three 6 Mafia, Brotha Lynch Hung, King Gordy, Kutt Calhoun, Krizz Kaliko and Big Scoob, among others. The album is broken up into sections: "Anger", "Madness" and "The Hole," which would also be used on three EP's released after it. On October 22, 2009, the album appeared as a featured "Album Premiere" on Myspace.

The album entered at number 14 on the US Billboard 200 chart, selling 30,326 copies in its first week.

== Background ==
Corey Taylor, from Slipknot and Stone Sour was supposed to appear on the track "Killing You", but was unable to begin recording in time and, as a result, failed to submit his vocals for the track. The label had to move forward with mastering the track for the album without his involvement.

== Promotion ==
On September 9, 2009, Strange Music released a video on its YouTube account showing Yates regarding to his upcoming music video for "Show Me a God", stating that it would be a very serious video dedicated to his mother. The music video for "Show Me a God" was then released through Strange Music's YouTube account on October 2, 2009. On October 7, 2009, a second version of this video has also appeared on the label's account, except this one is in high definition.

On October 20, 2009, "Leave Me Alone" and "Show Me a God" was officially released as the first and second digital singles. "Strange Music Box" was also designated as a single from the album.

The music video was filmed for the single "Leave Me Alone" which it was exclusively premiered on mtvU.com on October 27, 2009, in which was the album's original release date. The music video for "Low" was released on December 3, 2009.

== Track listing ==
Tracklist:
No.	Title	Writer(s)	Producer(s)	Length
1.	"Show Me a God"	A. Yates	Matic Lee	3:41
2.	"The Warning (Skit)"	S. Watson	Seven	0:31
3.	"Demons" (featuring Three 6 Mafia)	A. Yates; J. Houston; P. Beauregard	Matic Lee; Seven	5:23
4.	"Blackened the Sun"	A. Yates	Reuben "Bonyx" Armstrong	4:26
5.	"Strange Music Box" (featuring Brotha Lynch Hung & Krizz Kaliko)	A. Yates; K. Mann; S. Watson	Young Fyre; Karbon (add. prod.)	4:11
6.	"Sundae (Skit)"		Robert Rebeck	0:25
7.	"Check Yo Temperature" (featuring Sundae & T-Nutty)	A. Yates; S. Austin; T. Jones Jr.	Young Fyre; Demolish Beatz (add. prod.)	4:32
8.	"B. Boy" (featuring Big Scoob, Bumpy Knuckles, Kutt Calhoun & Skatterman)	A. Yates; M. Calhoun Jr.; S. Ashby Jr.; S. Landis	Young Fyre; Karbon (add. prod.)	5:29
9.	"Hunterish" (featuring Irv Da Phenom & Krizz Kaliko)	A. Yates; M. Irving Jr.; S. Watson	Young Fyre	3:47
10.	"The Pick Up (Skit)" (featuring Fat Tone)	A. Yates	Robert Rebeck	1:15
11.	"In the Trunk"	A. Yates	Reuben "Bonyx" Armstrong	4:25
12.	"Pinocchiho"	A. Yates	Matic Lee	2:10
13.	"Horns" (featuring King Gordy & Prozak)	A. Yates; S. Shippy; W. Alford II	Robert Rebeck	3:59
14.	"Interview with Jason Whitlock (Skit)"		Robert Rebeck; Seven	2:21
15.	"It Was An Accident" (featuring Alan Wayne)	A. Yates; Wayne	Seven	3:44
16.	"Shadows on the Road"	A. Yates; S. Watson	Seven	3:28
17.	"Low"	A. Yates; S. Watson	Reuben "Bonyx" Armstrong	3:33
18.	"Messages (Skit)"		Robert Rebeck	1:38
19.	"Killing You"	A. Yates; S. Watson	Matic Lee; Seven	3:36
20.	"Leave Me Alone"	A. Yates; S. Watson	Young Fyre; Karbon (add. prod.)	3:52
21.	"Prayer - By Brother K.T. (Skit)"	K. Taylor	Robert Rebeck	0:42
22.	"K.O.D." (featuring Mackenzie Nicole)	A. Yates; B. Fraser; S. Watson	Seven	5:14
23.	"The Martini" (featuring Krizz Kaliko)	A. Yates; S. Watson	Young Fyre	5:27
Total length:				77:52

Strange Music pre-order digital bonus track
No.	Title	Writer(s)	Producer(s)	Length
24.	"F.U.N. (Fuck U Niggas)"	A. Yates	Young Fyre; Karbon	3:51
Total length:				80:50

iTunes pre-order bonus tracks
No.	Title	Writer(s)	Producer(s)	Length
24.	"F.U.N. (Fuck You Niggas)"	A. Yates	Young Fyre; Karbon	3:51
25.	"Like I Died"	A. Yates	Reuben "Bonyx" Armstrong	3:54
Total length:				84:50

== Charts ==
Chart (2009)	Peak position
US Billboard 200	14
US Independent Albums (Billboard)	1
US Top Current Album Sales (Billboard)	14
US Top R&B/Hip-Hop Albums (Billboard)	7
