= Misery Loves Kompany =

Studio album by Tech N9ne
- Released: July 17, 2007
- Recorded: March 20 – April 26, 2007
- Genre: Hip-hop
- Length: 1:16:49
- Label: Strange Music
- Producer: David Sanders II, Seven, Rob Rebeck

Tech N9ne chronology
Everready (The Religion) (2006)	Misery Loves Kompany (2007)	Killer (2008)

Tech N9ne Collabos chronology
Misery Loves Kompany (2007)	Sickology 101 (2009)

Singles from Misery Loves Kompany
- 1. "Midwest Choppers" Released: June 19, 2007; 2. "Gangsta Shap" Released: June 19, 2007

Professional ratings
Review scores
Source	Rating
Allmusic	3.5/5 stars
RapReviews	(7.5/10) 2007

Misery Loves Kompany is the sixth studio album by rapper Tech N9ne, and the first release in the "Collabos" series.

== Background ==
The album was recorded in one month and was released on July 17, 2007. It features 17 tracks featuring artists such as Yukmouth, T-Nutty, D-Loc & Dalima, Greed, Money Hungry, Big Scoob (of the 57th Street Rogue Dog Villians), Joe Vertigo, Shadow, The Philstir and Mr. Reece as well as fellow label mates Krizz Kaliko, Kutt Calhoun, Skatterman & Snug Brim and Prozak. Production was mainly handled by David Sanders II, a producer from Huntsville, Alabama; Sanders handled half the production with the rest mainly being handled by Seven (who produced numerous track for Tech N9ne's 2006 effort Everready: The Religion) with lone production credit going to Rob Rebeck for "You Don't Want It."

== Reception ==
Following its release, the album debuted at number 49 on the U.S. Billboard 200, selling about 13,000 copies in its first week.

== Track listing ==
No.	Title	Writer(s)	Producer(s)	Length
1.	"Kansas City Shuffle (Intro)"	A. Yates, B. Fraser, N. Ellingburg	Robert Rebeck	1:41
2.	"Midwest Choppers" (featuring D-Loc, Dalima & Krizz Kaliko)	A. Yates, D. Epps, R. Easterwood, S. Watson	Seven	6:32
3.	"Misery" (featuring The Journalist & Yukmouth)	A. Yates, J. Ellis, L. Buch	Seven	4:41
4.	"That Box" (featuring Greed, Krizz Kaliko, Kutt Calhoun, Skatterman & Snug Brim)	A. Henderson, A. Yates, M. Calhoun, S. Landis, S. Watson, W. LeJeune	David Sanders II	5:50
5.	"Gangsta Shap" (featuring Krizz Kaliko & Kutt Calhoun)	A. Yates, M. Calhoun, S. Watson	David Sanders II	4:25
6.	"Sex Out South" (featuring Krizz Kaliko & Kutt Calhoun)	A. Yates, M. Calhoun, S. Watson	David Sanders II	5:31
7.	"Get Ya Head Right" (featuring Money Hungry & Snug Brim)	A. Henderson, A. Yates, T. Morris	Seven	4:55
8.	"Fan or Foe" (featuring Krizz Kaliko & T-Nutty)	A. Yates, S. Watson, T. Jones Jr.	Seven	4:30
9.	"Girl Crazy "Crazy Love"" (featuring Krizz Kaliko)	A. Yates	David Sanders II	5:28
10.	"2 Piece" (featuring Big Scoob, Joe Vertigo & Krizz Kaliko)	A. Yates, J. Watson, S. Ashby, S. Watson	Seven	5:05
11.	"Big Scoob" (featuring Big Scoob)	A. Yates, S. Ashby	Seven	4:05
12.	"Yeah Ya Can" (featuring Krizz Kaliko & Shadow)	A. Yates, G. Washington, S. Watson	Seven	4:21
13.	"I Can Feel It" (featuring Agginy & The Philstir)	A. Yates, P. Holley, R. Swinton	David Sanders II	4:39
14.	"Karma (Skit)"	A. Yates	Robert Rebeck	0:43
15.	"You Don't Want It" (featuring Krizz Kaliko, Mr. Reece & Prozak)	A. Yates, M. Thompson Jr., S. Shippy, S. Watson	Robert Rebeck	3:38
16.	"Message to the Black Man"	A. Yates	David Sanders II	4:58
17.	"The P.A.S.E.O. (The Poem Aaron Saw Extra Ordinary)"	A. Yates	David Sanders II	5:47
Total length:				76:59
