= The Lost Scripts of K.O.D. =

EP by Tech N9ne
- Released: March 30, 2010
- Genre: Horrorcore
- Length: 19:20
- Label: Strange Music
- Producer: Freddy Machete, Ruben Armstrong, Seven, Travis O'Guin (exec.), Young Fyre

Tech N9ne chronology
| K.O.D. (2009) | The Lost Scripts of K.O.D. (2010) | The Gates Mixed Plate (2010) |

Professional ratings
Review scores
| Source | Rating |
|---|---|
| AllMusic | 3.5/5 stars |
| RapReviews | (7/10) |

The Lost Scripts of K.O.D. is the first EP by rapper Tech N9ne, released on March 30, 2010. It debuted on the Billboard 200 chart at number 117.

The EP consists of five tracks that were written shortly after the K.O.D. album was completed. The beats that appear on the EP had been selected by the artist for inclusion on his previous studio album K.O.D. and he already had titles in mind for them, but he ended up filling the allotted time on the CD before writing to the selected beats.

== Track listing ==
| No. | Title | Writer(s) | Producer(s) | Length |
|---|---|---|---|---|
| 1. | "Like I Died (Remix)" (featuring Krizz Kaliko & Craig Smith) | A. Yates, C. Smith, S. Watson | Ruben Armstrong | 3:52 |
| 2. | "Stress Relief" | A. Yates | Young Fyre | 4:22 |
| 3. | "00N9NA" | A. Yates | Seven | 2:32 |
| 4. | "Pain Killer" (featuring Krizz Kaliko) | A. Yates | Seven | 4:05 |
| 5. | "Last Sad Song" (featuring Krizz Kaliko) | A. Yates, M. Queen | Freddy Machete | 4:31 |
| Total length: | | | | 19:20 |

== Samples ==
- "Last Sad Song"
  - "Give In to Me" by Michael Jackson
