= Jae Yoo =

South Korean model (born 1989)

- Born: Yoo Hyuk-jae; March 22, 1989 (age 37); Busan, South Korea
- Modeling information
- Height: 6'2
- Hair color: Black
- Eye color: Black
- Agency: Soul Artist

Hyuk-jae Yoo (born March 22, 1989) is a South Korean model who was born in Busan.

== Career ==
In 2010 he signed a contract with Soul Artist Management and in September of the same year debuted at a Tommy Hilfiger fashion show in New York City. The same year he appeared in the Japanese edition of Vogue in a photograph by Mariano Vivanco. From February to July 2011 he walked for various fashion houses in Milan and Paris including Calvin Klein, G-Star, Dolce & Gabbana, Bottega Veneta, Givenchy, and John Galliano. He became the first Asian man to walk for Calvin Klein's menswear show. The same year he became a model for American Eagle and appeared in Vogue again this time in a photo taken by Steven Klein. In September 2011 he performed at Michael Bastian and J.Crew shows.

== Personal life ==
Yoo was born in Busan, Korea, and lived there until he was ten or eleven, when his family moved to New Jersey. In an interview with Celebuzz he said that he prays before every fashion week
