= Word on tha Streets (Skatterman & Snug Brim album) =

- Original cover for the album, appearing on early promotional material.

Studio album by Skatterman & Snug Brim
- Released: August 12, 2008
- Recorded: 2008
- Genre: Gangsta rap
- Length: 75:57
- Label: Strange Music
- Producer: Bar None; David Sanders II; Robert Rebeck; Seven; Sound Man; Wyshmaster

Skatterman & Snug Brim chronology
Urban Legendz (2004)	Word on tha Streets (2008)

Singles from Word on tha Streets
- 1. "Ups And Downs" Released: July 22, 2008

Word on tha Streets is the third studio album from Kansas City, Missouri based hip hop duo Skatterman & Snug Brim. Their second and final album to be released on under Strange Music, the album was released on August 12, 2008

On July 22, a music video for the song "Ups And Downs" was released on the internet via video site YouTube.

== Track listing ==
No.	Title	Writer(s)	Producer(s)	Length
1.	"Intro (Skit)"	A. Yates	Robert Rebeck	01:20
2.	"I'm That Nigga" (featuring Rich The Factor & Tech N9ne)	A. Henderson, A. Yates, R. Johnson, S. Landis	Seven	05:02
3.	"Hold Me Down"	A. Henderson, S. Landis	David Sanders II	04:31
4.	"Sukka Dukkas" (featuring Young Buck)	A. Henderson, D. Brown, S. Landis	Seven	04:59
5.	"Get Back"	A. Henderson, S. Landis	David Sanders II	04:00
6.	"Go Hard" (featuring BG Bulletwound)	A. Henderson, G. Roland, S. Landis	Seven	03:46
7.	"On My Feet" (featuring Paul Wall)	A. Henderson, P. Slayton, S. Landis	Bar None	03:51
8.	"Lil' Momma"	A. Henderson, S. Landis	Seven	04:11
9.	"Come Over"	A. Henderson, S. Landis	Seven	04:29
10.	"Watchin' Me" (featuring Vance LaRoy)	A. Henderson, S. Landis	Wyshmaster	02:59
11.	"Run The Streets" (featuring Vance LaRoy)	A. Henderson, S. Landis	David Sanders II	03:05
12.	"Foolz" (featuring The Popper)	A. Henderson, S. Landis, W. Edwin	David Sanders II	04:42
13.	"Ups And Downs"	A. Henderson, S. Landis	David Sanders II	04:46
14.	"Old School" (featuring E-Clips)	A. Henderson, E. Collins, S. Landis	Seven	04:40
15.	"Knock Out (Skit)"	A. Yates, R. Rebeck	Robert Rebeck	00:20
16.	"Shit Starter"	A. Henderson, S. Landis	Robert Rebeck	03:52
17.	"Heartbreaker" (featuring Krizz Kaliko & Tech N9ne)	A. Henderson, A. Yates, S. Landis, S. Watson	David Sanders II	04:32
18.	"Bigga Than That" (featuring E-Skool & Young Age)	A. Henderson, E. Calbert, S. Landis, S. Maddox	Seven	03:51
19.	"It's Nothin'"	A. Henderson, S. Landis	Seven	03:06
20.	"Help Me Change" (featuring Kutt Calhoun & Vance LaRoy)	A. Henderson, M. Calhoun, S. Landis	Sound Man	03:55
Total length:				75:57
