= Urban Legendz =

Studio album by Skatterman & Snug Brim
- Released: March 23, 2004
- Genre: Gangsta rap
- Length: 63:41
- Label: Strange Music
- Producer: IcyRoc Kraven; Tekneko Bros. The Professionals

Skatterman & Snug Brim chronology
Worth a Million (2002)	Urban Legendz (2004)	Word on tha Streets (2008)

Singles from Urban Legendz
- 1. "Block Party" Released: 2004

Professional ratings
Review scores
Source	Rating
IGN	(7.8/10) link

Urban Legendz is the second studio album from American hip hop duo Skatterman & Snug Brim. It was released on March 23, 2004. The album's only single, "Block Party", reached number 24 on the Billboard Hot R&B/Hip-Hop Singles Sales" chart.

== Track listing ==
No.	Title	Producer(s)	Length
1.	"Say Whatcha Say"	Tekneko Bros. Productions	4:17
2.	"Block Party"	Tekneko Bros. Productions	3:10
3.	"Heart & Soul"	Tekneko Bros. Productions	4:18
4.	"Carwash" (featuring BG Bulletwound and Kutt Calhoun)	Tekneko Bros. Productions	5:08
5.	"Crazy" (featuring Kutt Calhoun)	Tekneko Bros. Productions	3:29
6.	"Murder by Numbers" (featuring Ricky Skarfo)	Icy Roc Kravyn	5:35
7.	"Lapdance" (featuring Tech N9ne and Krizz Kaliko)	Tekneko Bros. Productions	4:52
8.	"Mafioso" (featuring Greed, Kutt Calhoun and Tech N9ne)	The Professionals	3:32
9.	"Pakman" (featuring Kutt Calhoun)	The Professionals	3:40
10.	"Life In the Game" (featuring Krizz Kaliko)	The Professionals	4:20
11.	"Tired" (skit)	The Professionals	0:49
12.	"Tired" (featuring Agginy)	The Professionals	4:12
13.	"If U Want" (featuring Boy Big)	The Professionals	4:01
14.	"2 of Us"	The Professionals	3:55
15.	"Kansas City (Concrete Jungle)" (featuring Greed, Kutt Calhoun, Krizz Kaliko and BG Bulletwound)	Tekneko Bros. Productions	4:39
16.	"Shut It Down"	Tekneko Bros. Productions	4:32
