= Jae Synth =

- Born: January 9, 1980 (age 46)
- Origin: Sacramento, California
- Genres: Hip hop; R&B; Dubstep; Drum and bass; Techno; Electro music
- Occupations: Music video director; Music producer; disc jockey
- Years active: 2008–present

Jae Synth (born January 9, 1980) is an American music video director, music producer and disc jockey from Sacramento, California

== Music production ==
Jae Synth's is best known for his R&B and rap beats but he also makes music that falls into the hip-hop genre. His influences stem from his interest and background in dubstep, drum and bass, raves and jungle music.

His first album, The Resume, featured T.I., Young Buck, Snoop Dogg, Mac Dre, Keak da Sneak, B-Legit, and Turf Talk.

His sophomore album, Synth City included features from E-40, San Quinn, Mac Dre, Mistah F.A.B., and The Jacka.

== Radio career ==
In high school, Jae Synth had a radio show on KXHB, with his brother Tofu de la Moore, and later they had hosted a drum n' bass show on Power 105.5.

== Video Film and Directing ==
Jae Synth is a director/producer with Photo SYNTHesis Films. He released his first music video that he filmed and directed on 1/1/11, and he now has over 200 music videos. Jae Synth has filmed music videos in places such as London, Amsterdam, Sweden, Atlanta, Nashville, California, Puerto Rico, etc. Working with the likes of E40, Snoop Dogg, TI, Joyner Lucas, NBA Young Boy, Yo Gotti, Mozzy, Sada Baby, Dave East, Too Short, Dogg Pound, Kurupt, Trae tha Truth, Symba, Conway the Machine, Ice Cube, Bun B, OMB Peezy, Jabbawokkie, Dj Premier, Scarface, Keith the Sneak, MC Eiht, Burner, The Jakka, Larry June, Paul Wall, B-Legit, Yukmouth, Young Noble, Bubba Sparks, Joseline Hernandez, and more.

== Discography ==
Albums

- The Resume (2008)
- Synth City (2009)

Mixtapes

- 60 Minute Suicide (2009)
- DubSac (2009)
- Next 1000 (by Tais, mixed by Synth; 2009)
- Now You're in Reality (2010)

== Awards ==
2009 Sacramento News & Review- Sammies winner for "Outstanding Producer"
