= Skatterman & Snug Brim =

American hip hop group

- Also known as: Yung Gunz
- Origin: Kansas City, Missouri, United States
- Genres: Gangsta rap
- Years active: 2002–present
- Labels: Strange Music (2002–2009); Bigg Shot (2009–present)
- Members: Skatterman; Snug Brim
- Website: www.myspace.com/skattermankc

Skatterman & Snug Brim is an American hip-hop duo from Kansas City, Missouri.

After releasing projects separately, Skatterman (born Stacy Dewayne Landis) and Snug Brim (born Aaron R. Henderson) combined as a group. The duo released their first album, Worth A Million, in 2002 through Below Radar Records. On the cover they were listed as "Skatterman & Snug Brim," but the inside of the case displayed "Skatterman & Snug Brim AKA Yung Gunz." The "Yung Gunz" name was later dropped due to a conflict with another group of the same name, but different spelling, (Young Gunz).

After the release of their first album, the duo signed with the Kansas City-based label, Strange Music. They recorded the album, Urban Legendz which was released in 2004. The single from the album, "Block Party," charted #24 on Billboard's Hot R&B/Hip-Hop Singles Sales in October of the same year.

Word on tha Streets was released August 12, 2008. The follow-up to their Urban Legendz album featured the songs: "I'm That Nigga", "Sukka Dukkas" and "Heartbreaker." Featured artists included Tech N9ne, Young Buck, Paul Wall and Rich The Factor.

On February 9, 2009, Tech N9ne's official website announced the duo's decision to leave the Strange Music label after fulfilling their commitment.

== Bigg Shot Music & Films ==
Bigg Shot Music & Films
- Founded: 2009
- Founder: Skatterman; Snug Brim
- Distributor: Deep Distribution Worldwide
- Genre: Hip hop
- Country of origin: U.S.

On February 23, Skatterman & Snug Brim issued a press release through their MySpace account confirming that they had left the Strange Music label after fulfilling their two-album commitment. The duo also revealed that they had started a new label, Bigg Shot Music & Films, with Skatterman acting as President / CEO and Snug Brim handling the Creative / A&R aspect of the company.

Plans for a new Skatterman & Snug Brim album were also included in this release, indicating that their third album Perseverance would be released through the label on September 1 via a two-album distribution deal with RYKO/Warner Bros. However, plans for the album were later dropped due to Snug Brim's decision to go back to school and work towards a 15-month certification in music marketing. Skatterman also moved forward with work on a solo mixtape titled The Cookbook, released on November 2, 2009. The mixtape will be followed by his studio album, Self Made scheduled for release on March 16, 2010.

== Discography ==
=== Studio albums ===
Title	Album details
Worth a Million	Released: 2016; Label: Below Radar; Format: CD, digital download
Urban Legendz	Released: 2016; Label: Strange Music; Format: CD, digital download
Word on tha Streets	Released: 2016; Label: Strange Music; Format: CD, digital download

=== Solo albums ===
- 1998: Southside Rollers
- 2009: The Cook Book: Recipe 1
- 2012: The Cook Book: Recipe Two

==== Snug Brim ====
- 1998: Center Piece Of The Puzzle
- 2001: Snug Brim Presents Murder 1 Rebelz
- 2009: Hood Gospel

=== Music videos ===
- 2007: Get It (by Snug Brim) (Directed by Kirk "KoBayne")
- 2008: Ups And Downs (Directed by "The Ebonie Jeneus")

==== Features ====
- 2013: Bloodstepp - Putcha Hands Up Again (Featuring Skatterman & Snug Brim) from the album Bass and Bubblegum
- 2014: Bloodstepp - Putcha Hands Up Again (Featuring Skatterman & Snug Brim) (Chopped And Skrewed By DJ Mad Hatter) from the album Grand Theft Ufo: Floppy Disk Edition
